= Kantakouzenos =

Byzantine aristocratic family

Kantakouzenos Καντακουζηνός Cantacuzenus
- Noble family
- Country: Byzantine Empire; Despotate of Morea
- Founded: 11th century 1347 (as imperial family)
- Founder: John Kantakouzenos; John VI Kantakouzenos (first emperor)
- Final ruler: Matthew Kantakouzenos (Byzantine throne); Demetrios I Kantakouzenos (Despotate of Morea)
- Titles: Byzantine Emperor; Despot of Morea
- Deposition: 1357 (Byzantine throne); 1383 (Despotate of Morea)
- Cadet branches: Cantacuzino

The House of Kantakouzenos (pl. Kantakouzenoi; Greek: Καντακουζηνός, pl. Καντακουζηνοί; feminine form Kantakouzene; Καντακουζηνή), also found in English-language literature as Cantacuzenus or Cantacuzene, was a Byzantine Greek noble family that rose to prominence in the middle and late Byzantine Empire. The family became one of the empire's wealthiest landowners and provided several prominent governors and generals, as well as two Byzantine emperors between 1347–1357.

In the mid-14th century, the Kantakouzenoi challenged the rule of the Palaiologos dynasty and nearly established themselves as the new imperial family. After the death of Andronikos III Palaiologos, his underage son, John V, inherited the throne. The first civil war broke out between 1341–1347 with the Empress, the Patriarch, and Apokaukos on one side against the powerful Grand domestic John VI Kantakouzenos on the other. Initially victorious, John VI was proclaimed senior emperor (alongside John V) and attempted to consolidate his family on the throne; he also proclaimed his son Matthew as co-emperor in 1353. Wanting to seize power for himself, John V initiated a second civil war between 1352–1357 in which he emerged victorious as the sole Byzantine emperor, decisively deposing the Kantakouzenoi from the throne. The family continued to hold important titles in the empire maintaining their position as despots of Morea until 1383. The Kantakouzenoi intermarried extensively with other Byzantine noble families such as the Palaiologoi, the Philanthropenoi, the Asen, and the Tarchaneiotes.

== Name ==
The origin of the family's surname, according to Donald Nicol, "lies between romantic guesswork and philological conjecture." Prince Michael Cantacuzino, an 18th-century Romanian aristocrat of the Cantacuzino family who traced his ancestry to this Byzantine family, provides examples of the first kind, such as the family began with a certain "Lucie Cusin" who married one "Serafina Catina", and united their familial names into the compound one of "Ca(n)tacuzino"; this theory is now rejected. Nicol and Kazhdan favour the etymology forwarded by Konstantinos Amantos, according to which the name Kantakouzenos derives from kata-Kouzenan (Greek: κατὰ-κουζηνᾶν or κατὰ-κουζηνόν, lit. "near or at Kouzenas"), ultimately from the locality of Kouzenas, a name for the southern part of Mount Sipylus near Smyrna. Nicol lists some connections the Kantakouzenos had with the locale in the 11th and 13th centuries.

== History ==
=== Middle Byzantine period ===
The Kantakouzenoi likely originated in Asia Minor; they first appear in the reign of Alexios I Komnenos, when a member of the family campaigned against the Cumans in 1094. From the 12th century onwards, their interests and properties seem to have lain more in the European provinces of the empire in mainland Greece. Like many other Byzantine families, they rose to nobility as members of the military aristocracy. Owning large estates, they became part of the social class known at the time as the dynatoi ('the powerful'). In the Komnenian period, members of the family are attested as military officials: the sebastos John Kantakouzenos was a general under Manuel I Komnenos and lead many successful campaigns between 1150–1153; he was killed in the Battle of Myriokephalon in 1176. His probable grandson, the Caesar John Kantakouzenos, married Irene Angelina, the sister of Isaac II Angelos. By the time of the Fourth Crusade, the Kantakouzenoi were among the greatest landholders in the empire, possessing vast estates in the Peloponnese.

=== Late Byzantine period ===
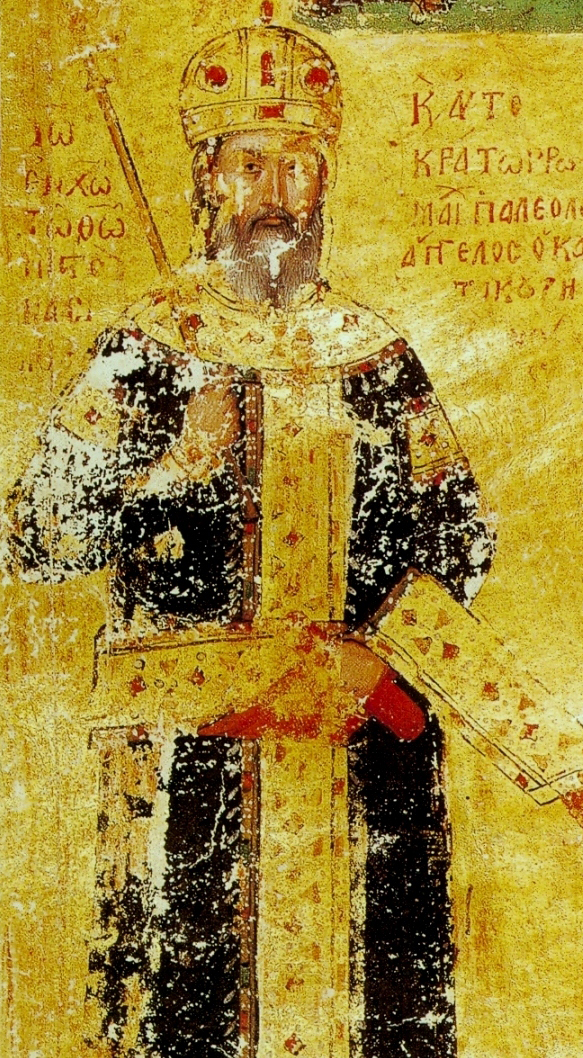
John VI Kantakouzenos as Byzantine emperor.

The family remained prominent in the Palaiologan period. In the 13th century members of the family appeared in the Peloponnese and Nicaea and some of them were accepted into the elite of the Byzantine society, the hereditary aristocracy, known as eugeneis ('well-born'). Michael Kantakouzenos was appointed the first epitropos (governor) of the Morea in 1308 and his son, John VI Kantakouzenos, rose to be megas domestikos, regent, and eventually emperor (r. 1347–1354). When Andronikos III Palaiologos died in 1341, his underage son John V Palaiologos (r. 1341–1391) inherited the throne. Disputes over regency were raised between two opposing aristocratic factions; on one side stood Andronikos III's friend and powerful Grand domestic John Kantakouzenos, who was proclaimed regent and was soon recognised as co-emperor by his armies. He was challenged by the self-proclaimed council of regency consisting of John V's mother and widowed empress Anna of Savoy, the Patriarch John XIV Kalekas, and megas doux Alexios Apokaukos. The disputes led to a devastating civil war lasting from 1341 to 1347 and won by John, who gained control of the capital and was formally crowned senior co-emperor as John VI. (Note: Empress Anna agreed that John VI would rule as senior emperor for ten years, after which John V would reach seniority and share power as an equal to Kantakouzenos.) Kantakouzenos attempted to consolidate his own dynasty on the imperial throne marrying his daughter Helena Kantakouzene to John V and proclaiming his son Matthew Kantakouzenos as co-emperor (r. 1353–1357). Intending to usurp the throne for himself, John V initiated a new series of civil wars from 1352 to 1357 against his co-emperors, which he eventually won; Matthew was captured and held hostage by the Serbs, who had allied with the Palaiologoi, and was eventually handed over to John V for ransom. Defeated, he was forced to resign marking the end of the imperial Kantakouzenos family (John VI had already been removed from power and retired in a monastery in 1354).

John VI's younger son Manuel Kantakouzenos remained despotes in the province of Morea from 1349 until 1380. Of John's other daughters, Maria married Nikephoros II Orsini of Epirus, and Theodora married the Ottoman bey Orhan I. The despot of Morea, Manuel, died in 1380 and was succeeded by his older brother and former co-emperor Matthew, who had travelled to Morea in 1361. In c. 1382, Theodore I Palaiologos was appointed by the emperor to be the new ruler of Morea. In 1383, upon the transition of power from the Kantakouzenos to the Palaiologos family, Matthew's son, Demetrios Kantakouzenos (perhaps along with his brother John) briefly succeeded his father as ruler of Morea and rivaled the Palaiologoi who nevertheless gained control of the province; Theodore became despot in 1383. It is generally believed that John, about whom relatively few documents have survived, died childless, and that the numerous Kantakouzenoi of the following generation, as well as the historian Theodore Spandounes and the wife of genealogist Hugues Busac, trace their descent from Matthew through Demetrios. The possible descendants of Demetrios (the exact parentage is uncertain) were Georgios, called "Sachatai"; Andronikos, the last megas domestikos of the Byzantine Empire; Irene, who married Đurađ Branković; Thomas, who served in Branković's court; Helena, who became the second wife of David of Trebizond; and an unnamed daughter, who may have become queen of Georgia.

== Family tree ==
House of Kantakouzenos

Kantakouzenos
son	son	son
John sebastos ∞ Maria Komnene (daughter of Andronikos Komnenos)	John; Caesar ∞ Irene Angelina (daughter of Andronikos Angelos)	Michael ∞ Angelina (daughter of John Doukas)	Manouel pinkernes of Nicaea	Michael megas konostaulos
John pinkernes, duke of the Thracesian Theme ∞ Irene Palaiologina (daughter of Andronikos Palaiologos)	Michael governor of the Morea ∞ Theodora	son
Theodora ∞ 1.George Mouzalon megas logothetes 2.John Raoul	Maria ∞ 1.Alexios Philes; 2.Konstantin Tih of Bulgaria; 3.Ivaylo of Bulgaria	Anna ∞ Nikephoros I Angelos despot of Epirus	John VI; Byzantine Emperor (1347-1354) ∞ Irene Asan-Mitso (daughter of Andronikos Asen)	(daughter) ∞ (Guy) Konstantine II king of Armenia	Nikephoros sebastokrator
Demetrios mesazon	Matthew; Byzantine Co-Emperor (1353-1357) ∞ Irene Palaiologina	Manuel despot of the Morea ∞ Zambia/Isabelle de Lusignan (daughter of (Guy) Constantine II king of Armenia)	Maria ∞ Nikephoros II Orsini despot of Epirus	Theodora ∞ Orhan emir of Bithynia	Helena ∞ John V Palaiologos; HOUSE OF PALAIOLOGOS	Theodora ∞ Alexios III of Trebizond
Theodore Kantakouzenos	John despot	Demetrios I Kantakouzenos despot of the Morea	Helena ∞ don Louis Fadrique count of Salona, etc	Halil	Irene Palaiologina
John/Janja noble in Novo Brdo of Serbia	Demetrius writer in Serbia	Theodora ∞ Alexios IV of Trebizond	George Sachatai general	Andronikos megas domestikos	Thomas; Serbian magnate, general	Irene ∞ Đurađ Branković despot of Serbia	Helena ∞ David of Trebizond	daughter ∞ George VIII of Georgia
Manuel usurper administrator of Mani	Demetrios	Zoe ∞ James II de Flory office in Cyprus	Anna ∞ Vladislav Hercegović duke of Saint Sava in Herzegovina	daughter
Michael	Charola de Flory ∞ Hugue Buzak	Eudokia
Demetrios	Theodore Spandounes historian
Michael Şeytanoğlu; PHANARIOTE-ROMANIAN BRANCH princes of Wallachia & Moldavia

== See also ==
- Cantacuzino, a family of Phanariote and Romanian boyars who trace their descent from the Kantakouzenoi
- Serbian Orthodox Secondary School "Kantakuzina Katarina Branković" in Zagreb, Croatia is named after one of Irene Kantakouzene daughters Kantakuzina Katarina Branković, there is also Order of Kantakuzina Katarina Branković named after her.
- Palaiologos dynasty and related family tree

== Sources ==
- Kazhdan, Alexander, ed. (1991). The Oxford Dictionary of Byzantium. Oxford and New York: Oxford University Press. ISBN 0-19-504652-8.
- Nicol, Donald M. (1968). The Byzantine Family of Kantakouzenos (Cantacuzenus), ca. 1100–1460: A Genealogical and Prosopographical Study. Dumbarton Oaks studies 11. Washington, DC: Dumbarton Oaks Center for Byzantine Studies.
- Speake, Graham (2021). Encyclopedia of Greece and the Hellenic Tradition. Taylor & Francis. ISBN 9781135942069.
- V. A. Fine Jr., John (1994). The Late Medieval Balkans, A Critical Survey from the Late Twelfth Century to the Ottoman Conquest. University of Michigan Press. ISBN 9780472082605.
- Nicol, Donald (2002). The Reluctant Emperor, A Biography of John Cantacuzene, Byzantine Emperor and Monk, C.1295-1383. Cambridge University Press. ISBN 9780521522014.
- Stathakopoulos, Dionysios (2023). A Short History of the Byzantine Empire, Revised Edition. Bloomsbury Publishing. ISBN 9781350233430.
