= Irene Palaiologina =

Irene Palaiologina or Palaeologina (Greek: Ειρήνη Παλαιολογίνα) may refer to:

- Irene Palaiologina, Empress of Bulgaria, daughter of Michael VIII Palaiologos, Empress-consort of Bulgaria in 1279–80
- Irene Palaiologina (fl. 1310), illegitimate daughter of Andronikos II Palaiologos, wife of John II Doukas of Epirus
- Irene Palaiologina of Trebizond, illegitimate daughter of Andronikos III Palaiologos, reigning Empress of Trebizond in 1340–41
- Irene Palaiologina (Byzantine empress), Empress-consort of Matthew Kantakouzenos
- Maria-Irene Palaiologina
- Irene Palaiologina, daughter of John V Palaiologos and Helena Kantakouzene and wife of Halil Bey of Bithynia, son of Orhan I with Helena's sister, Theodora Kantakouzenos.
- Irene Palaiologina, mother of Theodora Raoulaina
- Irene Palaiologina, daughter of Lazar Branković and Helena Palaiologina
