= Helena Kantakouzene =

Empress consort of the Byzantine Empire
- Tenure: 28 May 1347 – 12 August 1376
- Tenure: 1 July 1379 – 14 April 1390
- Tenure: 17 September 1390 – 16 February 1391
- Born: 13 August 1333; Byzantine Empire
- Died: 10 December 1396 (aged 63); Hagia Martha, Constantinople, Byzantine Empire (modern-day Istanbul, Turkey)
- Spouse: John V Palaiologos
- Issue Detail: Andronikos IV Palaiologos; Irene Palaiologina; Manuel II Palaiologos; Theodore I Palaiologos, Lord of Morea; Michael Palaiologos
- House: Kantakouzenos
- Father: John VI Kantakouzenos
- Mother: Irene Asanina

Helena Kantakouzene (Greek: Ἑλένη Καντακουζηνή, romanized: Eléni Kantakouzēne; 1333 – 10 December 1396) was the Empress consort of John V Palaiologos of the Byzantine Empire. She served as Regent during the absence of her son Manuel II in 1393.

== Life ==
She was a daughter of John VI Kantakouzenos and Irene Asanina; Donald Nicol believes she was the youngest of their three daughters. She was a sister of Matthew Kantakouzenos and Manuel Kantakouzenos. Her sisters Maria and Theodora were the respective wives of Nikephoros II Orsini and Orhan.

John V and John VI were rival emperors in a civil war fought from 1341 to 1347. The two sides at last reached an agreement. According to its terms John VI would be recognized as senior co-emperor with John V as his junior. The peace was sealed with the marriage of Helena to John V.

=== Empress ===
The marriage occurred on 28–29 May 1347, on the eighth day after her father's coronation by the Patriarch Isidore. Helena was about thirteen years old while her groom was a month short of his fifteenth birthday. Peace only lasted until 1352 when her husband resumed hostilities against her father. John VI was forced to resign the throne on 4 December 1354. Her brother Matthew would retain his title as co-emperor until his own defeat in 1357.

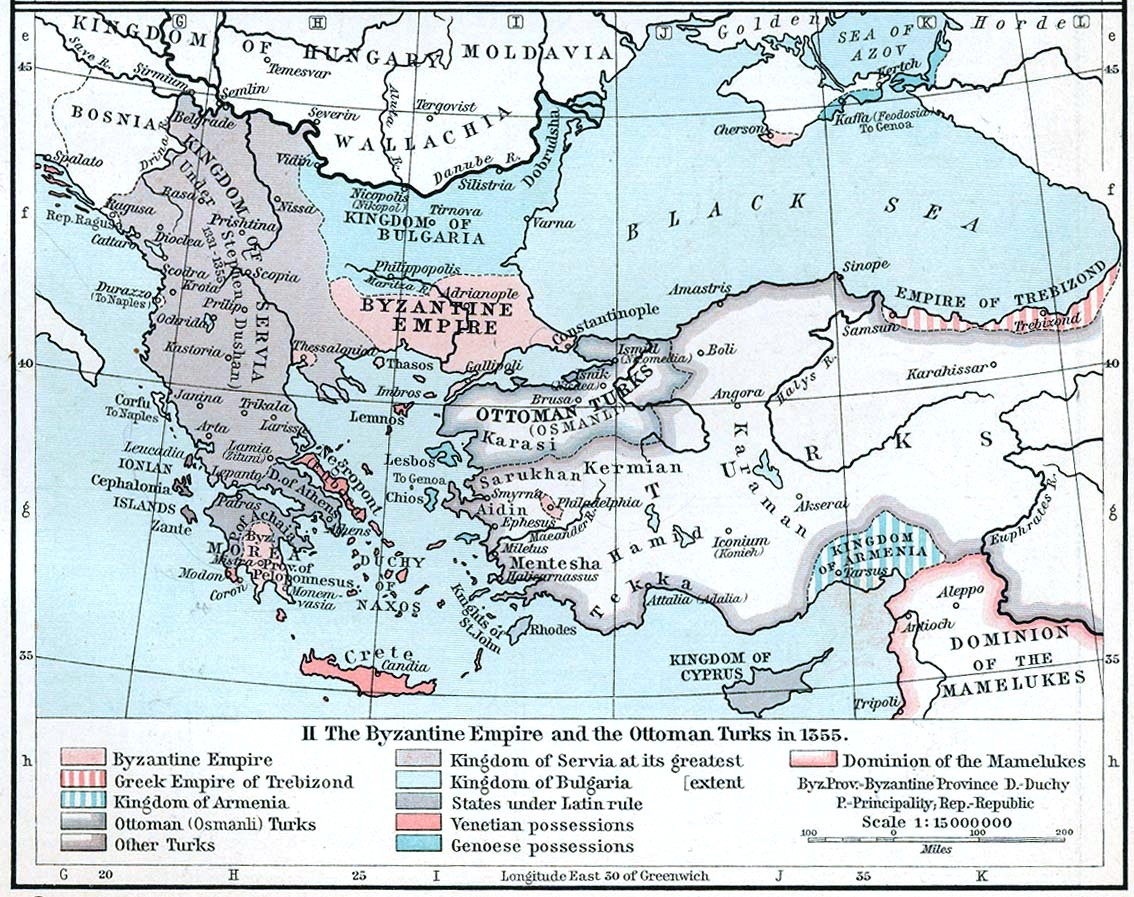
The Byzantine Empire and surrounding region in 1355

Previous to her marriage, Helena had accompanied her mother and sister to Selymbria for the wedding of her sister Theodora to the Ottoman Emir Orhan in 1346. Shortly after her own wedding, Orhan sent an agent to Constantinople to assassinate her husband, thinking he was doing John VI Kantakouzenos a favor. In 1352 Helena accompanied with her husband and her younger son Manuel to Thrace to accept control of the cities John VI had allotted him. Nicephorus Gregoras claims she later went to Constantinople to protect her father from possible actions by her husband, who had joined the anti-Palamite cause.

When her son Andronikos IV deposed his father 12 August 1376 in the struggle of the ongoing civil war, Helena tried to reconcile the two parties. Despite her efforts, John V and his sons Theodore and Manuel were put in prison October of that year. When the three escaped from prison in June 1379, she was thought responsible for it. Andronikos IV then fled to Galata, taking with him as hostages Helena, her elderly father John VI, and her two sisters Maria and Theodora. There the four were kept in strict confinement and suffered increasing privation during the siege of the fortress of Galata. They were released after John V and Andronikos signed a treaty in May 1381, and according to Demetrios Kydones, received a tumultuous welcome from the people of Constantinople.

=== Later life ===
John V died in 1391, and Helena became a nun in the convent of Kyra Martha in Constantinople, adopting the name of Hypomone. Nicol suggests she took up her vocation after July 1392, for there is evidence that she was still taking an active part in the affairs of state at that time.

She served as regent for her son Manuel II during his absence on his meeting with the Porte in Serres in 1393.

She died in 1396, sometime between October and December.

== Family ==
Helena and John V had at least ten children— five sons and at least five daughters. These known children include:

- Andronikos IV Palaiologos (2 April 1348 – 28 June 1385);
- Irene Palaiologina (c.1349 – after 1372), who married her first cousin Halil Bey. Her husband was a son of Orhan and Helena's sister Theodora Kantakouzene. The couple had two sons, Gündüz Bey (1361-1362) and Ömer Bey (1362-1362).
- Manuel II Palaiologos (27 June 1350 – 21 July 1425);
- Theodore I Palaiologos, Lord of Morea (c. 1355 – 24 June 1407), in 1404 his daughter married Süleyman Çelebi, son of Bayezid I;
- Michael Palaiologos (d. 1376/1377), who claimed the throne of the Empire of Trebizond from Alexios III;
- Maria Palaiologina, married Murad I; son of Orhan;
- A daughter, name unknown, reported to have entered a monastery in 1373, who may be different women from the ones listed above.
- A daughter, name unknown, who married Bayezid I, son of Murad I;
- A daughter, name unknown, who married Yakub Çelebi, son of Murad I.

== Depictions in fiction ==
A fictionalised form of her character features prominently in the novel Adora by Bertrice Small, published 1980.

== Sources ==
- Nicol, Donald M. (1968). The Byzantine Family of Kantakouzenos (Cantacuzenus), ca. 1100–1460: A Genealogical and Prosopographical Study. Dumbarton Oaks studies 11. Washington, DC: Dumbarton Oaks Center for Byzantine Studies.

Helena Kantakouzene Kantakouzenos Born: 1333 Died: 1396
Royal titles
Preceded by Irene Asanina	Byzantine Empress consort 1347–1376 with Irene Asanina (1347–1354); Irene Palaiologina (1353–1357)	Succeeded by Keratsa of Bulgaria
Preceded by Keratsa of Bulgaria	Byzantine Empress consort 1379–1391	Succeeded by Helena Dragaš
