= Byzantine civil war of 1373–1379 =

Military conflict

- Part of the Byzantine civil wars
Date	1373–1379
Location	Constantinople
Result	Victory of John V Palaiologos and Murad I
Territorial changes	Byzantines cede Gallipoli to the Ottomans; Tenedos is depopulated and made neutral territory

Belligerents
(Byzantine Empire) John V Palaiologos; Ottoman Empire; Republic of Venice	(Byzantine Empire) Andronikos IV Palaiologos (Ottoman Empire) Savcı Bey; Republic of Genoa

Commanders and leaders
(Byzantine Empire) John V Palaiologos (Byzantine Empire) Manuel II Palaiologos (Ottoman Empire) Murad I	(Byzantine Empire) Andronikos IV Palaiologos (Ottoman Empire) Savcı Bey (POW)

The Byzantine civil war of 1373–1379 was a military conflict fought in the Byzantine Empire between Byzantine Emperor John V Palaiologos and his son, Andronikos IV Palaiologos, also growing into an Ottoman civil war as well, when Savcı Bey, the son of Ottoman Emperor Murad I joined Andronikos in a joint rebellion against their fathers. It began when Andronikos sought to overthrow his father in 1373. Although he failed, with Genoese aid, Andronikos was eventually able to overthrow and imprison John V in 1376. In 1379 however, John V escaped and, with Ottoman help, regained his throne. The civil war further weakened the declining Byzantine Empire, which had already suffered several devastating civil wars earlier in the century. The primary beneficiary of the war were the Ottomans, as the Byzantines became their vassals.

The Byzantine Empire was facing a dire economic and political situation during the reign of Andronicus II. The Black Death had killed a substantial proportion of the Empire’s population and decimated the workforce, while corruption, mismanagement, and foreign invasion threatened the empire. In 1373, Andronikos IV attempted a failed coup and later became embroiled in a conflict with his father over the succession to the throne. The civil war weakened the empire even further, leading to the loss of soldiers and resources and making it difficult to defend against Ottoman expansion.

== Background ==
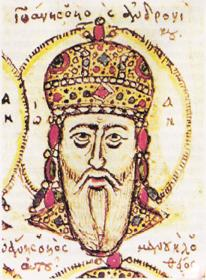
Emperor John V Palaiologos, from a 15th-century manuscript.

When John V assumed sole rule of the Empire in 1354, he pursued a pro-Western foreign policy. He gave Lesbos and his sister's hand in marriage to a Genoese. He sold the empire's last port in Anatolia, Pontic Heraclea, to the Venetians. He converted to Roman Catholicism, an action that alienated him from his subjects and gained little in return. By the 1360s, the Byzantine Empire was a shadow of its former self. Its last domains in Thrace were being overrun by the Ottomans, who in 1365 captured Adrianople (modern Edirne). In 1369, seeking aid from the West, John V visited Pope Urban V that summer. Following that, he sailed to Venice, where he negotiated a treaty in which the Venetians would cancel the Emperor's debt in return for the island of Tenedos. On leaving Byzantine soil, he left his two sons, Andronikos IV and Manuel, to manage Constantinople and Thessalonica, respectively. Andronikos IV, the elder son and co-emperor, refused to hand over Tenedos to the Venetians as agreed. Consequentially, the Venetians detained the Emperor for two years until Manuel intervened on his behalf.

== First conflict – Failed revolt of Andronikos IV, 1373 ==
Andronikos IV resented his father's acceptance of tributary and vassal status to the Ottoman Empire in 1373, and in the same year, he joined Savcı Bey, a son of the Ottoman Sultan Murad I, in a joint open rebellion against their fathers. Both revolts were suppressed, although Byzantine military weakness meant that this was largely carried out by Turkish troops. Murad blinded (and later executed) Savcı and demanded that John V in turn blind both Andronikos and the latter's son, John, as well. John V did so only partially, leaving Andronikos IV with one eye and his grandson only partially blinded, but he did imprison Andronikos. The younger John greatly resented his grandfather's action and would rebel against him in 1390, reigning for five months. In the aftermath of Andronikos' failure, Manuel was raised to co-emperor and heir to John V as Manuel II.

== Second conflict – Andronikos' usurpation, 1376–1379 ==
Shortly after Andronikos was imprisoned, John V sold Tenedos to the Venetians on similar terms to previous failed agreement. The Genoese however did not take kindly to the island being in the hands of the Venetians, with whom they were embroiled in a war. Thus, in 1376, the Genoese, based in their colony in Galata, helped free Andronikos and procure Ottoman troops for him. Andronikos assumed control of Constantinople and imprisoned the Emperor John V and his younger brother Manuel. In return for their help, Andronikos IV now gave Tenedos to the Genoese and Gallipoli to the Ottomans.

These acts in turn embroiled him, shortly after his accession, in a war with Venice. Together with his son, John VII, who was crowned as co-emperor in 1376, there were now no less than four emperors and one Despot in Byzantium, all of them more or less pawns in the policies of the Ottomans and the Italian city-states. Andronikos IV ruled until 1379, when John V and Manuel II escaped and fled to the court of Murad I. After apparently agreeing to cede the virtually independent Byzantine exclave of Philadelphia to the Ottomans, John V was reestablished on the throne with the help of Venetian ships and Ottoman soldiers.

== Aftermath ==
After John V entered the capital, Constantinople, Andronikos IV fled to Genoese Galata and stayed there two years. However he held hostage for a time his mother, Helena Kantakouzene, and her father, the former emperor John VI Kantakouzenos. However, in 1381 a treaty was signed which allowed him to return. Later on, the Venetians and Genoese ended their war and agreed to depopulate Tenedos and raze its fortifications, hence transforming it to a neutral territory. This conflict further weakened the Byzantine Empire, which was surrounded by the massive and ever-expanding Ottoman Empire.

== See also ==
- Byzantine civil war of 1321–1328
- Byzantine civil war of 1341–1347
- Byzantine civil war of 1352–1357

== Sources ==
- Treadgold, Warren (1997). A History of the Byzantine State and Society. Stanford, California: Stanford University Press. ISBN 0-8047-2630-2.
- Browning, Robert (1992), The Byzantine Empire, The Catholic University of America Press, ISBN 0-8132-0754-1
- Haldon, John (2003), Byzantium at War, Routledge, ISBN 0-415-96861-5
