= Irene Palaiologina (daughter of John V) =

Byzantine princess, daughter of John V Palaiologos

- Princess of Byzantium; Princess of Bithynia
- Born: c. 1349
- House: Palaiologos
- Father: John V Palaiologos
- Mother: Helena Kantakouzene
- Religion: Eastern Orthodoxy

Irene Palaiologina (Greek: Εἰρήνη Παλαιολογίνα, romanized: Eirēnē Palaiologina; c. 1349 - fl. 1372) was a Byzantine princess, the daughter of Emperor John V Palaiologos and Helena Kantakouzene. She was betrothed to her maternal cousin, Halil Bey, the son of Ottoman Sultan Orhan and Theodora Kantakouzene.

== Biography ==
Irene Palaiologina was born in 1349 as one of older children of John V Palaiologos and Helena Kantakouzene. In 1352, her parents left for Thrace to take charge of the administration of the cities that had been ceded to them by their grandfather John VI Kantakouzenos. Irene, however, remained in the capital, where her father entrusted his daughter's education and upbringing to her grandmother, Empress Irene Asanina, who cared for her until her parents' return.

In 1358, ten-year-old Irene was betrothed to Halil Bey, an Ottoman prince, son of Sultan Orhan I. Irene's fiancé was also her first cousin, as his mother Theodora Kantakouzene was Irene's maternal aunt, sister of Empress Helena Kantakouzene. In 1357, the Ottoman prince was kidnapped by Genoese pirates and, after long attempts to free him with the help of Irene's brother Andronikos IV Palaiologos, he was released for a large ransom in 1359. The betrothal was the counterpart demanded by the Byzantines in exchange for help in freeing the prince. Shortly after, Irene married Halil. She was widowed in 1362, when her husband was executed by his older half-brother, the new Sultan Murad I.

In 1372, the Byzantines offered Irene's hand in marriage to King Peter II of Cyprus, but the offer was rejected by the Cypriots. There is no further information on the princess's life.

== Bibliography ==
- Nicol, Donald MacGillivray (1968). The Byzantine Family of Kantakouzenos (Cantacuzenus) Ca. 1100-1460: A Genealogical and Prosopographical Study. Dumbarton Oaks Center for Byzantine Studies, trustees for Harvard University.
- Nicol, Donald MacGillivray (2004). The last centuries of Byzantium, 1261-1453 (2. ed., transferred to digital print ed.). Cambridge: Cambridge Univ. Press. ISBN 978-0-521-43991-6.
- Nicol, Donald M. (2002-08-22). The Reluctant Emperor: A Biography of John Cantacuzene, Byzantine Emperor and Monk, C.1295-1383. Cambridge University Press. ISBN 978-0-521-52201-4.
- İnalcık, Halil (2010). Kuruluş dönemi Osmanlı sultanları, 1302-1481. Temel kültür dizisi. İstanbul: İslam Araştırmaları Merkezi. ISBN 978-605-5586-06-5.
- Leslie P. Peirce (1993). Imperial Harem. Oxf. U. P. (N. Y.). ISBN 978-0-19-508677-5.
- Trapp, Erich; Walther, Raiser; Beyer, Hans-Veit; Sturm-Schnabl, Katja (1996). Prosopographisches Lexikon der Palaiologenzeit. Veröffentlichungen der Kommission für Byzantinistik. Wien: Verl-der Österreichischen Akademie der Wissenschaften. ISBN 978-3-7001-2545-7.
