= Halil Bey (son of Orhan) =

Ottoman prince (1347–1362)

- Born: 1347(?); Ottoman beylik
- Died: 1362 (aged 14–15); Ottoman beylik
- Issue: Gündüz Bey; Ömer Bey
- Dynasty: Ottoman
- Father: Orhan I
- Mother: Theodora Kantakouzene (disputed)
- Religion: Islam

Halil Bey (1347? – 1362; Ottoman Turkish: شاھزادہ خلیل) was an Ottoman prince, son of Orhan, the second bey of the Ottoman beylik, and Theodora Kantakouzene, the daughter of Byzantine emperor John VI Kantakouzenos and Irene Asanina. His kidnapping was an important event in 14th century Ottoman-Byzantine relations. He was executed by his half-brother Murad I.

== Kidnapping ==
In the mid-14th century, piracy along the Aegean Sea and the Marmara Sea coasts was widespread. The pirates usually kidnapped people for ransom. In 1357, they kidnapped Halil near İzmit (ancient Nikomedia) on the Marmara coast. It is not known whether they knew the identity of their prey beforehand, but upon learning it, they escaped to Phocaea (modern Foça) on the Aegean coast. Phocaea was a Byzantine fort recently captured from Republic of Genoa and commanded by Leo Kalothetos. Orhan appealed to the Byzantine emperor Andronikos IV Palaiologos to rescue his son. He offered to cancel Byzantine debts and promised not to support the Kantakouzenos family's claims on the Byzantine throne. Andronikos agreed and tried to rescue Halil, but Leo was reluctant and in 1358 Andronikos had to lay siege to Phocaea with a small fleet of three vessels (the expenses of which were paid by Orhan). He also called Ilyas Bey, the ruler of Saruhan (a small Turkmen beylik in west Anatolia formed after the disintegration of the Sultanate of Rum), for a joint operation against Phocaea. However, Ilyas was playing both sides and planning to kidnap Andronikos during a hunting party. Nevertheless Andronikos was able to forestall his plans by arresting him. Without Saruhan collaboration, he lifted the siege. After the failure of the 1358 operations, Orhan came to Scutari (modern Üsküdar) on the Asiatic shore of the Bosporus for talks and agreed to pay 30,000 ducats as a ransom. In 1359, Halil was released.

== Aftermath ==
As a part of the agreement, Halil was engaged to Irene Palaiologina, the 10-year-old daughter of John V Palaiologos. Since Halil's elder brother Süleyman Pasha had already died, the Palaiologos family hoped to see him as the new ruler of the Ottoman beylik. But to their dismay, after Orhan’s death, Halil's brother Murad I was enthroned as the new Sultan. Although Halil tried to fight for the throne, he was executed in 1362 by his brother. Even though Halil and Irene were engaged, they did not marry because of Halil’s unexpected death.

== Issue ==
Halil had two sons by unknown mothers:

- Gündüz Bey (1361–1362),
- Ömer Bey (1362–1362),

== See also ==
- List of kidnappings
