= Michael Palaiologos =

Michael Palaiologos or Michael Palaeologus (Greek: Μιχαήλ Παλαιολόγος) may refer to:

- Michael Palaiologos (general) (died 1156), Byzantine military leader
- Michael VIII Palaiologos (1223–1282), Byzantine emperor
- Michael IX Palaiologos (1277–1320), Byzantine emperor
- Michael Palaiologos (son of Andronikos III) (born 1331), Byzantine prince
- Michael Palaiologos (son of John V) (died 1376/7), Byzantine prince
