= Irene Asanina =

Empress consort of the Byzantine Empire

Empress consort of the Byzantine Empire
- Tenure: 1341–1354
- Born: c. 1300
- Died: between 1363 and 1379
- Spouse: John VI Kantakouzenos
- Issue Detail: Matthew Kantakouzenos; Manuel Kantakouzenos; Theodora Kantakouzene; Helena Kantakouzene; Andronikos Kantakouzenos; Maria Kantakouzene
- House: Asen
- Father: Andronikos Asen
- Mother: ... Tarchaneiotissa

Irene Asenina (Greek: Εἰρήνη Ἀσανίνα; died after 1354), was the empress consort of John VI Kantakouzenos of the Byzantine Empire. She is known to have participated in military issues to a degree uncommon for a Byzantine empress. She commanded the garrison of Didymoteicho during the Byzantine civil war of 1341–1347, and organized the defense of Constantinople against the Genoese in 1348, and the forces of John V in 1353.

She also played a role in assisting her husband in negotiations with the Serbs and the Turkish beyliks of Anatolia to secure their support during the civil war. In addition, she contributed to the peace agreement that helped bring the conflict to an end, including the marriage of their daughter, Helena Kantakouzene, to John V Palaiologos as part of the settlement.

In 1354, John VI was forced to abdicate. He and Irene retired from imperial life and entered monastic retirement. Irene survived her husband for some time, but the exact date and circumstances of her death are unknown. She is remembered as one of the Byzantine empresses most directly involved in politics and military affairs.

== Early life ==
Asenina was a daughter of Andronikos Asen and his wife Tarchanaiotissa. Her paternal grandparents were Ivan Asen III of Bulgaria and Irene Palaiologina. Her maternal grandparents were protostrator Michael Doukas Glabas Tarchaneiotes and his wife Maria Doukaina Komnene Palaiologina Branaina.

The last names of her maternal grandmother indicate descent from the families Doukas, Komnenos and Palaiologos who each produced several Byzantine Emperors. Her last name however indicates being a member of the Branas family which produced military leaders, like Alexios Branas and Theodore Branas, but whose genealogy is poorly recorded.

Her paternal grandmother, Irene Palaiologina, was a daughter of Michael VIII Palaiologos and Theodora Palaiologina which makes Asenina a member of the extended Imperial family of her time.

== Empress ==
Kantakouzenos was a trusted advisor of Andronikos III Palaiologos, grandson of Andronikos II and great-grandson of Michael VIII. Andronikos III died on 15 June 1341 and was succeeded by his eldest son John V Palaiologos, who was only nine-years-old and was placed under the regency of his mother Anna of Savoy. However Andronikos III had entrusted the administration of the empire to Kantakouzenos.

At about the same time, Stefan Uroš IV Dušan of Serbia launched an invasion of Northern Thrace. Kantakouzenos left Constantinople to try to restore order to the area. Anna took advantage of his absence to declare him an enemy of the state and to strip him of titles and fortune. But Kantakouzenos was still in control of part of the Byzantine army and, on 26 October 1341, he answered by proclaiming himself emperor at Didymoteicho. Irene joined him and was crowned Empress at his side. One of her first acts as Empress was to obtain the release of her two brothers, John and Manuel Asen, who had been imprisoned in Thrace since 1335 on a charge of treason.

This was the beginning of a civil war that would last until 1347. Ivan Alexander of Bulgaria soon allied with the faction under John V and Anna while Stefan Uroš IV Dušan of Serbia sided with John VI. Both parties were actually taking advantage of the civil war to advance their own political and territorial agendas and John VI even allied himself with Orhan I of the nascent Ottoman Sultanate.

During the war Irene remained at Didymoteicho with her three daughters while John VI was busy campaigning. Irene was given the command of the garrison and defended Didymoteicho. She defended the city from the attacks of King Ivan Alexander the best she could until her husband, with the help of Sultan Umur of Aydın, made his way back to Didymoteicho in the winter of 1343. Her courageous efforts impressed many of her contemporaries, such as Umur himself and the historian Nikephoros Gregoras.

On 3 February 1347, the two sides reached an agreement. John VI was accepted as senior emperor with John V as his junior co-ruler. The agreement was sealed with the marriage of their daughter Helena Kantakouzene to John V. John VI entered Constantinople and took effective control of the city with Irene serving as senior Empress at his side.

In 1348, Irene organised the defense of Constantinople against the Genuese.

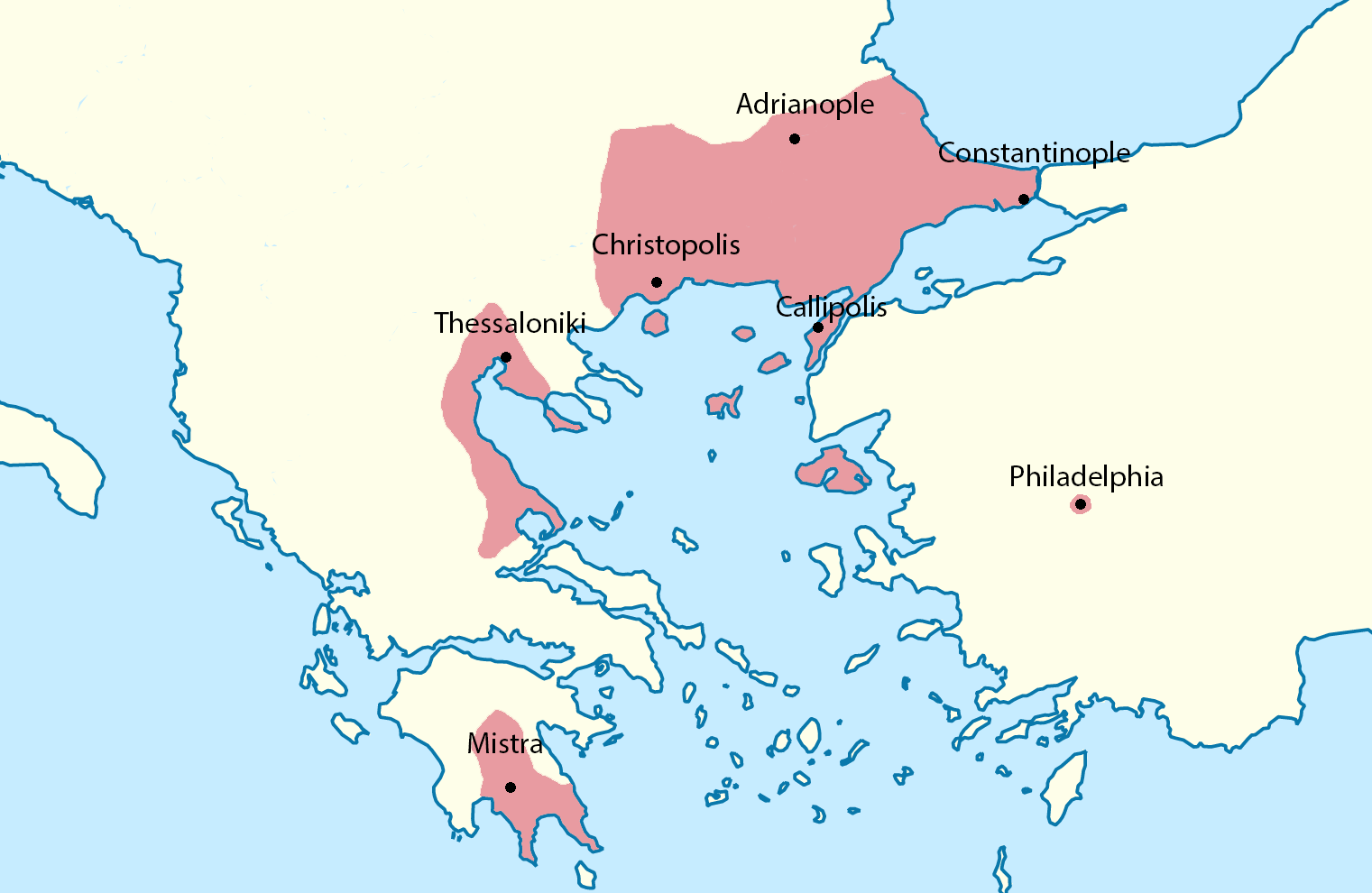
Byzantine Empire in 1350

However, John V restarted the conflict in 1352 and gained support as the "legitimate" emperor. In 1353, Irene organised the defense of Constantinople against John Palaiologos.

== Later life ==
On 4 December 1354, John VI abdicated and the former imperial couple retired themselves to separate monasteries. In her case, it was the convent of Hagia Martha under the monastic name Eugenia. In 1356 and the following year, Irene rejected the offer of Ziani, to effect the release of her son Matthew Kantakouzenos, then imprisoned by Emperor John V, and reinstate him as Emperor. In 1359, she was joined at the convent by her daughter Maria, and her granddaughter Theodora, the eldest daughter of Matthew.

Nicol speculates that she followed the rest of her family to the Morea where her younger son Manuel Kantakouzenos was Despot, but may have returned to Constantinople in 1362 or 1363, where she may have been one of the "Empresses" whom the ambassadors from the Empire of Trebizond met there in April 1363.

Although the date of her death is not recorded, Nicol presumes it happened before 1379 when her husband and other members of her family were taken to Galata as hostages by Andronikos IV Palaiologos.

== Marriage ==
Irene married John Kantakouzenos, a son of Michael Kantakouzenos and Theodora Angelina Palaiologina. In his History, John records his mother being a kinswoman of Andronikos II Palaiologos, presumably a cousin by one of the siblings of Michael VIII. The marriage produced six children:

- Matthew Kantakouzenos (c. 1325 – 1383), co-emperor 1353–1357, later despotēs in Morea.
- Manuel Kantakouzenos (c.1326 – 1380), despotēs in Morea.
- Theodora Kantakouzene (c.1330 – c.1396), who married Sultan Orhan of the Ottoman Empire.
- Helena Kantakouzene (1333 – 1396), who married Emperor John V Palaiologos.
- Andronikos Kantakouzenos (c.1334 – 1347). The History of John records that this son died due to "plague". Given the year of his death, Andronikos was probably among the casualties of the Black Death.
- Maria Kantakouzene (died after 1379), who married Nikephoros II Orsini of Epirus.

== Sources ==
- Nicol, Donald M. (1968). The Byzantine Family of Kantakouzenos (Cantacuzenus), ca. 1100–1460: A Genealogical and Prosopographical Study. Dumbarton Oaks studies 11. Washington, DC: Dumbarton Oaks Center for Byzantine Studies.

Irene Asanina Asen dynasty Born: ? Died: ?
Royal titles
Preceded by Anna of Savoy	Byzantine Empress consort 1341–1354 with Helena Kantakouzene (1347–1354); Irene Palaiologina (1353–1354)	Succeeded by Helena Kantakouzene and Irene Palaiologina
