= Theodora Kantakouzene (wife of Orhan) =

Wife of Orhan Ghazi (c. 1330 – c. 1396)

- Born: c. 1330; Byzantine Empire
- Died: c. 1396 (aged 65–66); Constantinople, Byzantine Empire (present day Istanbul, Turkey)
- Spouse: Orhan Gazi (m. 1346; died 1362)
- Issue: Halil Bey (disputed)
Names
- Theodora Kantakouzene; Greek: Θεοδώρα Καντακουζηνή
- House: Kantakouzenos (by birth); Ottoman (by marriage)
- Father: John VI Kantakouzenos
- Mother: Irene Asanina
- Religion: Greek Orthodox Christian

Theodora Kantakouzene (Greek: Θεοδώρα Καντακουζηνή, romanized: Theodṓra Kantakouzēne; c. 1330 – c. 1396, called also Theodora Hatun) was a Byzantine princess, daughter of Emperor John VI Kantakouzenos and the legal wife of the Ottoman Sultan Orhan Gazi.

== Life ==
Theodora was one of the three daughters of Emperor John VI Kantakouzenos by his wife Irene Asanina. The historian Nikephoros Gregoras erroneously calls her "Maria" in one passage. In January 1346, to cement her father's alliance with the rising Ottoman emirate and to prevent the Ottomans from siding with the Empress-regent Anna of Savoy during the ongoing civil war, at the age of 15 or 16, she was betrothed to the Ottoman ruler, Orhan Gazi, who was 65 at the time.

The marriage took place in the summer of the same year and it was an unprecedented event, since it saw a legitimate Christian princess united in a regular marriage to a Muslim sovereign, and Orhan had already a legal wife, Asporça. However, the union was not contested by any religious authority, either Christian or Islamic. Her parents and sisters escorted her to Selymbria, where Orhan's representatives, including grandees of his court and a cavalry regiment, arrived on a fleet of 30 ships. A ceremony was held at Selymbria, where Orhan's envoys received her and escorted her to the Ottoman lands in Bithynia, across the Marmara Sea, where the actual wedding took place.

Theodora remained a Christian after her marriage, and was active in supporting the Christians living under Ottoman rule, as well as working to ensure that Christian apostates who converted to Islam returned to their original religion. In 1347, she gave birth to her only son, Halil Bey, the last of Orhan’s children. However, contemporary sources—both Byzantine and early Ottoman chroniclers—do not state that Halil Bey was born to Theodora Kantakouzene. According to historian Yahya Başkan, although many historians accept Theodora Kantakouzene as Halil’s mother, the lack of primary sources makes this claim doubtful. As a child, Halil Bey was captured by Genoese pirates for ransom, and he was later freed with the help of the Byzantine emperor John V Palaiologos. He was later betrothed to Irene, the daughter of John V Palaiologos and Helena Kantakouzene, who was Theodora’s sister. However, the marriage never took place because of Halil’s unexpected death.

Except for a three-day sojourn in Constantinople in February 1347, in the aftermath of her father's victory in the civil war, Theodora remained at the Ottoman court until Orhan's death in 1362. At that point, Murad I, son of Orhan and his concubine Nilüfer Hatun, ascended the throne and ordered Theodora's son and grandsons to be executed for treason. After that, she apparently returned to Constantinople, where she lived with her sister, the Empress Helena, in the palace. She is last known to have been held imprisoned at Galata during the brief reign of Andronikos IV Palaiologos there in 1379–81.

== Issue ==
By Orhan, she had a son:

- Halil Bey (1347?–1362) Orhan’s last child. He was engaged to his maternal cousin, the Byzantine princess Irene Palaiologina, but the marriage never took place because of Halil’s unexpected death. Halil had two sons whose mother is unknown. He was executed by his half-brother, Murad I.

== Depictions in fiction ==
A fictionalised form of her character is the subject of Bertrice Small's novel Adora, published in 1980.

== Sources ==
- Nicol, Donald MacGillivray (1996). The Reluctant Emperor: A Biography of John Cantacuzene, Byzantine Emperor and Monk, c. 1295–1383. Cambridge University Press. ISBN 978-0-521-52201-4.
- Trapp, Erich; Walther, Rainer; Beyer, Hans-Veit; Sturm-Schnabl, Katja (1981). Prosopographisches Lexikon der Palaiologenzeit (in German). Vol. 5. Vienna: Verlag der Österreichischen Akademie der Wissenschaften. ISBN 3-7001-3003-1.
