= Andronikos Asen =

14th-century Byzantine administrative official

Andronikos Asen (Greek: Ανδρόνικος Ασάν, romanized: Andrónikos Asén; died c. 1322) was the epitropos ("steward, overseer") of the Byzantine province of the Morea between 1316 and 1322.

== Life ==
Andronikos Asen was the son of Bulgarian Tsar Ivan Asen III and Irene, who was the sister of Byzantine emperor Andronikos II Palaiologos. His father and mother escaped to Byzantine territory during the uprising of Ivaylo in 1280. After Michael Kantakouzenos' death in 1316, Andronikos II gave Andronikos Asen the position of epitropos of the small Byzantine province in the south-eastern part of the Morea.

Kantakouzenos had already managed to consolidate the province, and enjoyed some success against the Frankish Principality of Achaea in the north. Asen continued in the same line, and taking advantage of internal strife in Achaea, he conquered much territory in the central Morea. In 1320, he took the castles of Akova, Polyphengos, Karytaina and Saint George in Skorta, and defeated a Frankish army near the latter fort in September.

He was an ancestor of later Byzantine emperors, as his granddaughter, Helena, married John V Palaiologos, whose descendants later became Byzantine emperors.

== Family ==
Andronikos married a certain Tarchaneiotissa, whose first name is not known. She was a daughter of protostrator Michael Doukas Glabas Tarchaneiotes and his wife Maria Doukaina Komnene Palaiologina Branaina.

The last names of her mother indicate descent from the families Doukas, Komnenos and Palaiologos who each produced several Byzantine Emperors. Her last name however indicates being a member of the Branas family which produced military leaders like Alexios Branas and Theodore Branas, but whose genealogy is poorly recorded.

They had at least four children:

- Manuel Komnenos Raoul Asen. A military commander. Later strategos in Didymoteicho (1342) and Governor of Bizye (1344). Married Anna Komnene Doukaina Palaiologina Synadene. She was a daughter of Theodore Komnenos Doukas Synadenos Palaiologos and Eudokia Muzakiaina.
- John Asen. A military commander, governor of Melenikon (1342) and Morrha (1343). Married a daughter of Alexios Apokaukos and an unnamed daughter of Disypatos.
- Irene Asanina. Married John VI Kantakouzenos.
- Another daughter. She married Centurione I Zaccaria, Baron of Damala, Chalandritsa, Estamira and Bailee of the Principality of Achaea.

== Sources ==
- Georg Ostrogorsky, Byzantische Geschichte 324–1453.
- Housley, Norman (1992). The later Crusades, 1274–1580: from Lyons to Alcazar. Oxford University Press. ISBN 978-0-19-822136-4.

Preceded by Michael Kantakouzenos	Epitropos of the Morea; 1316–1322	Unknown
