= İlyas Bey of Saruhan =

İlyas Bey (died 1362) was the second bey (lord) of the Turkish beylik of Saruhan in the 14th century.

== Background ==
Saruhan Beylik was a Turkmen principality founded after the disintegration of Seljuks of Turkey by İlyas's father Saruhan Bey. The capital of the beylik was Manisa (ancient Magnesia). Upon his father's death in 1345, İlyas was enthroned as the second bey of the beylik.

== Foreign relations ==
Beylik of Aydın was to the south, Beylik of Germiyan was to the east and Beylik of Karesi (later Osmanlı Beylik) was to the north of Saruhan. Although the beylik was a maritime beylik, the important castle Phocaea (modern Foça) on the Aegean coast was a fort of Genoa (later Byzantine Empire). İlyas was usually in good terms with both the neighbouring beyliks and Phocaea.

== Struggle with Byzantine Empire ==
In 1358 İlyas Bey was involved in an event known as Kidnapping of Şehzade Halil. Phocaea was a part of Byzantine Empire, but the commander of the fort Leo Kalontheros refused to obey emperor Andronikos IV Palaiologos‘s command to liberate Şehzade Halil of the Ottomans who was previously kidnapped. The emperor laid a siege to Phocaea and asked for İlyas Bey's support. Although İlyas pretended to support the emperor, being an ally of Phocaea, he planned to arrest the emperor during a hunting party. But it turned out that it was the emperor who arrested İlyas Bey. İlyas's wife had to pay ransom to liberate her husband.

== Last years of İlyas ==
İlyas returned to Manisa and continued to reign in his beylik. He died in 1362. He was succeeded by his son, İshak, the governor of Menemen .
