= Manuel Kantakouzenos =

Despot of the Morea

Manuel Kantakouzenos (or Cantacuzenus) (Greek: Μανουήλ Καντακουζηνός, romanized: Manouḗl Kantakouzēnós), (c. 1326 – Mistra, Peloponnese, 10 April 1380) was the despotēs in the Despotate of Morea or the Peloponnese from 25 October 1349 to his death.

== Life ==
Manuel Kantakouzenos was the second son of Emperor John VI Kantakouzenos and Irene Asanina. Donald Nicol believes he was born around 1326 or slightly later.

Manuel is first mentioned in March 1342 when he and his brother Matthew Kantakouzenos accompanied his father from Didymoteichos for Thessalonica as officers. In April of the next year, Emperor John entered Veria with the help of Stephen Dushan and appointed Manuel as governor of the city. In June 1345 supporters of his father seized control of Thessalonica and sent an appeal of help to Manuel, but the army he sent arrived too late to save the situation. In 1347 Stephan Dushan seized Veria from Manuel, forcing the former to seek refuge with his uncle John Angelos in Thessaly. After his father took control of Constantinople in May 1347, he sent for Manuel to come to the city, and the following year he entrusted Manuel with its government. As kephalatikeuontes ("headsman") of the city, Manuel led its defense against the Genoese in the war of 1348–1349.

At the conclusion of the war with Genoa, Manuel was named governor of Morea by his father, and arrived in his province on 25 October 1349. Manuel was the first of a series of long-ruling governors of the province who bore the title of despotēs and were closely related to the emperors at Constantinople. Manuel established order in his province by crushing the opposition of local notables (Archontes). His success was such that when John VI Kantakouzenos was forced to abdicate by his son-in-law John V Palaiologos, Manuel was able to resist the attempt to replace him as governor by the emperor's appointees. Eventually Manuel was recognized as governor of Morea by the new regime. Following the abdication of his father John Kantakouzenos, who was now the monk Josaph, the rest of his family joined Manuel in the Morea. Some of Manuel's enemies circulated a rumor that his older brother, the former Emperor Matthew Kantakouzenos, plotted to replace him as governor, but when he was persuaded the rumor was false, the two worked together in the administration of the province, although Nicol observes "Matthew played no more than a secondary role."

For the larger portion of his reign, Manuel maintained peaceful relations with his Latin neighbors and secured a long period of prosperity for the area. Greco-Latin cooperation included an alliance to contain the raids of Murad I into Morea in the 1360s. The Aragonese version of the Chronicle of the Morea states that, in alliance with Gautier de Lor, the Venetians, and the Hospitallers, he scored a naval victory over a Turkish fleet off Megara, setting fire to 35 of the enemy ships; the survivors then fled to Roger of Lluria at Thebes. On the other hand, in the mid-1370s he was drawn into a conflict between Francesco Sansverino, Bailli of Achaea, and the town of Gardiki (modern Anavryto). He set off with an army consisting of 1000 knights and 2000 infantry, which was crushed by Sansverino; Manuel managed to escape with the survivors of his army. Eventually the Frankish knights tired of besieging Gardiki and abandoned the enterprise.

Moreover, Manuel encouraged the immigration of Albanians to settle in the depopulated province as a source of economic and military manpower.

On his death in 1380, Manuel was succeeded as governor by his older brother, Matthew. Nicol believes Manuel was buried in Mystras.

== Family ==
Manuel was betrothed to Isabelle (or Zampea-Maria) de Lusignan (ca or after 1333 – in Cyprus, 1382–1387), a daughter of Guy of Lusignan (King Constantine II or IV of the Armenian Kingdom of Cilicia) some time before 1341, while Emperor Andronikos III Palaiologos was still alive. However, after Andronikos' death Guy had fallen out with John Kantakouzenos over the succession and the engagement was broken and Manuel was engaged instead to the daughter of Jovan Oliver, Voivode of Ovče Pole. After John achieved victory in the subsequent civil war, Manuel took pains to point out no vows had been made in this second engagement, so his marriage to Isabelle would not be irregular. She followed him to Morea in 1349, living with him there until his death; Nicol speculates that, although there is some evidence she administered the Despotate following his death, she moved to Cyprus where she had family. They had no children.

== Sources ==
- Nicol, Donald M. (1968). The Byzantine Family of Kantakouzenos (Cantacuzenus), ca. 1100–1460: A Genealogical and Prosopographical Study. Dumbarton Oaks studies 11. Washington, DC: Dumbarton Oaks Center for Byzantine Studies. OCLC 390843.
- Nicol, Donald M. (1993). The Last Centuries of Byzantium, 1261–1453 (Second ed.). Cambridge: Cambridge University Press. ISBN 978-0-521-43991-6.
- Nicol, Donald M. (1996). The Reluctant Emperor: A Biography of John Cantacuzene, Byzantine Emperor and Monk, c. 1295-1383. Cambridge: Cambridge University Press. ISBN 9780521522014.
- Kazhdan, Alexander, ed. (1991). The Oxford Dictionary of Byzantium. Oxford and New York: Oxford University Press. ISBN 0-19-504652-8.

Manuel Kantakouzenos Kantakouzenos dynasty Born: c. 1326 Died: 10 April 1380
Regnal titles
| New creation | Despot of the Morea; 1354–1380 | Succeeded by Matthew Kantakouzenos |
