= Byzantine civil war of 1352–1357 =

Civil war in the Byzantine Empire

- Part of the Byzantine civil wars, the Byzantine–Serbian wars and the Byzantine–Turkish wars
Date	1352–1357
Location	Thrace and Constantinople
Result	John V Palaiologos becomes sole ruler, deposes the Kantakouzenoi
Territorial changes	Byzantine ruled by John V Palaiologos

Belligerents
(Byzantine Empire) John V Palaiologos; Allies: Serbian Empire (Second Bulgarian Empire) Bulgarian Empire; Republic of Venice; Republic of Genoa	(Byzantine Empire) John VI Kantakouzenos (Byzantine Empire) Matthew Kantakouzenos (POW); Allies: (Ottoman Empire) Ottoman Beylik

The Byzantine civil war of 1352–1357 was an armed conflict resulting from and following the Byzantine civil war of 1341–1347. The war pitted Byzantine emperor John V Palaiologos against John VI Kantakouzenos and his eldest son Matthew Kantakouzenos. John V emerged victorious as the sole emperor of the Byzantine Empire, but the destruction brought about by the civil war left the Byzantine state in ruins.

== Background ==
In the aftermath of the 1341–1347 conflict, John VI Kantakouzenos established himself as senior emperor and tutor over the young John V Palaiologos. However, this state of affairs did not last long. Supporters of the Palaiologoi still distrusted him, while his own partisans would have preferred to depose the Palaiologoi outright and install the Kantakouzenoi as the reigning dynasty. Kantakouzenos' eldest son, Matthew, also resented being passed over in favour of John V. To placate him, a semi-autonomous appanage covering much of western Thrace was created. It doubled as a march against the new Serbian Empire of Stephen Dushan.

Steadily deteriorating relations between Matthew, who now ruled eastern Thrace, and John V, who lived in western Thrace, sowed the seeds for the resumption of the civil war.

== Course of the War ==
Open warfare broke out in 1352, when John V, supported by Venetian and Serbian troops, launched an attack on Matthew Kantakouzenos. John Kantakouzenos came to his son's aid with 10,000 Ottoman troops who retook the cities of Thrace, plundering them in the process. In October 1352, at Demotika, the Ottoman force met and defeated 4,000 Serbians provided to John V by Dushan. This was the Ottomans' first victory in Europe. Two years later, their capture of Gallipoli marked the beginning of the Ottoman conquest of the Balkans, culminating a century later in the Fall of Constantinople. Meanwhile, John V fled to the island of Tenedos, from where he made an unsuccessful attempt to seize Constantinople in March 1353.

John VI Kantakouzenos responded by having Matthew crowned as co-emperor, but John V Palaiologos, enlisting Genoese support and relying on the declining popularity of Kantakouzenos, succeeded in entering the capital in November 1354. John VI Kantakouzenos abdicated and retired to a monastery. Matthew held out in Thrace and made war upon the Serbians in 1356. Later, Matthew gathered an army of 5,000 Turks and marched on Serres, the Serbian-held capital of John Ugleisha. Stephen Urosh V, whose mother also ruled at Serres, decided to raise an army to defend his mother. In 1357, when Matthew and his Turks attacked, the Serbian army under Vojin, Count of Drama (a major fortress in that vicinity) came to the rescue and the Turks were defeated. Matthew was captured and held hostage until his ransom was paid by John V Palaiologos, who was now the sole master of a rump state. Matthew was allowed to go to the Morea and reign there with his brother Manuel Kantakouzenos.

== Sources ==
- Fine, John Van Antwerp (1994), The Late Medieval Balkans: A Critical Survey from the Late Twelfth Century to the Ottoman Conquest, University of Michigan Press, ISBN 978-0-472-08260-5
- Kazhdan, Alexander, ed. (1991), Oxford Dictionary of Byzantium, Oxford University Press, ISBN 978-0-19-504652-6
- Nicol, Donald MacGillivray (1993), The Last Centuries of Byzantium, 1261–1453, Cambridge University Press, ISBN 978-0-521-43991-6
- Nicol, Donald MacGillivray (1996), The Reluctant Emperor: A Biography of John Cantacuzene, Byzantine Emperor and Monk, c. 1295–1383, Cambridge University Press, ISBN 978-0-521-52201-4
- Reinert, Stephen W. (2002), "Fragmentation (1204–1453)", in Mango, Cyril (ed.), The Oxford History of Byzantium, Oxford and New York: Oxford University Press, pp. 248–283, ISBN 978-0198140986
- Soulis, George Christos (1984), The Serbs and Byzantium during the reign of Tsar Stephen Dušan (1331–1355) and his successors, Dumbarton Oaks, ISBN 0-88402-137-8
- Treadgold, Warren T. (1997), A History of the Byzantine State and Society, Stanford University Press, ISBN 0-8047-2630-2
