= Michael Palaiologos (son of John V) =

Byzantine governor (??–1376/77)

Michael Palaiologos (Greek: Μιχαήλ Παλαιολόγος; died 1376/77) was a son of Byzantine emperor John V Palaiologos. Michael was the governor of Mesembria and claimant of the Empire of Trebizond.

== Life ==
Little is known of Michael's life. He was born sometime after 1351, as the third or fourth son of John V and his wife, Helena Kantakouzene. He was married to a Bulgarian princess, daughter of Dobrotitsa, and was raised to the rank of Despot at an unknown date.

In 1366, Michael accompanied his father to his visit to Buda, the capital of the Kingdom of Hungary, where he sought aid against the Ottoman Turks. By 1371, he was governor of the port of Mesembria on the coast of Thrace. In November 1373, he sailed to Trebizond, where he tried to force the deposition of the Emperor of Trebizond, Alexios III. His fleet of three ships laid at anchor outside the city's harbor for five days, when he sailed back in failure. He was murdered in 1376/7 by his brother-in-law, Terter.

== Sources ==
- Guilland, Rodolphe (1959). "Recherches sur l'histoire administrative de l'Empire byzantin: Le despote, δεσπότης". Revue des études byzantines (in French). 17: 52–89. doi:10.3406/rebyz.1959.1199.
- Trapp, Erich; Beyer, Hans-Veit; Kaplaneres, Sokrates; Leontiadis, Ioannis (1989). "21522. Παλαιολόγος Μιχαήλ". Prosopographisches Lexikon der Palaiologenzeit (in German). Vol. 9. Vienna: Verlag der Österreichischen Akademie der Wissenschaften.
