= Matthew Asen Kantakouzenos =

- Emperor and Autocrat of the Romans
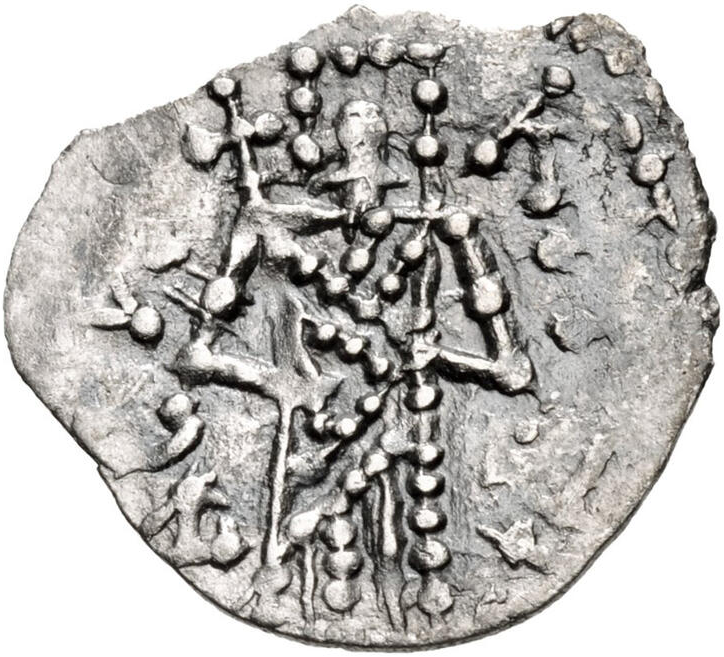
- Coin of Matthew Kantakouzenos as emperor

Byzantine emperor
- Reign: April 1353 – December 1357
- Predecessor: John V Palaiologos and John VI Kantakouzenos
- Successor: John V Palaiologos

Despot of the Morea
- Reign: 1380–1381
- Predecessor: Manuel Kantakouzenos
- Successor: Demetrios I Kantakouzenos
- Born: c. 1325
- Died: June 1383
- Spouse: Irene Palaiologina
- Issue: John Kantakouzenos; Demetrios I Kantakouzenos; Theodora Kantakouzene; Helena Kantakouzene; Maria Kantakouzene; Theodore Kantakouzenos (?)
- House: Kantakouzenos
- Father: John VI Kantakouzenos
- Mother: Irene Asanina

Matthew Asen Kantakouzenos or Cantacuzenus (Greek: Ματθαῖος Ἀσάνης Καντακουζηνός, romanized: Matthaīos Asánēs Kantakouzēnós, c. 1325 – June 1383) was Byzantine Emperor from 1353 to 1357 and later Despot of the Morea from 1380 to 1381.

== Life ==
Matthew Asanes Kantakouzenos was the son of Emperor John VI Kantakouzenos and Irene Asanina. In return for the support he gave to his father during his struggle with John V Palaiologos, he was given part of Thrace as an appanage in 1347, and was proclaimed joint emperor in 1353, when open civil war broke out again with John V.

From his Thracian domain, centred on Gratzianous, he led several wars against the Serbs. An attack, which he prepared in 1350, was frustrated by the defection of his Turkish auxiliaries. With five thousand Turks, Matthew tried to re-establish his former appanage along the Serbian-Byzantine border by attacking this region, but failed to take Serres. He was soon defeated in battle in late 1356 or early 1357 by a Serb army under Vojvoda Vojihna, who was the holder of Drama (a major fortress in the vicinity). The Serbs captured Matthew with the intention of releasing him when he had raised the large ransom they demanded. However John V, who had rapidly moved in to occupy Matthew's lands, offered Vojihna an even larger sum to turn Matthew over to him.

After imprisoning Matthew first on Tenedos, then on Lesbos under the watchful eye of Francesco I Gattilusio, John forced him to renounce the imperial title. John then released him to go to the Morea, where he joined his brother Manuel, who was ruling there (1361). After his brother's death in 1380, Matthew Asanes Kantakouzenos governed the Morea until the appointment of the new governor Theodore I Palaiologos, in 1381, and his arrival in 1382. Before full transition of power in the Morea, from the Kantakouzenos family to that of Palaiologos, Matthew resigned his power in the Morea to his son Demetrios I Kantakouzenos.

== Family ==
By his wife Irene Palaiologina, whom he married in Thessalonika early in 1341, Matthew Asanes Kantakouzenos had five known children:

1. John Kantakouzenos, despotēs
2. Demetrios Kantakouzenos, sebastokratōr
3. Theodora Kantakouzene
4. Helena Kantakouzene, who married Louis Fadrique, Count of Salona
5. Maria Kantakouzene, who married John Laskaris Kalopheros
6. (possibly) Theodore Kantakouzenos, ambassador to France and Venice

== Works attributed ==
The following are attributed to Kantakouzenos:

- Commentary on the Song of Songs.
- Commentary on the Book of Wisdom.
- Horismos (1354).
- Philosophical essays addressed to his daughter Theodora (two treatises).

== Sources ==
- Kazhdan, Alexander, ed. (1991). The Oxford Dictionary of Byzantium. Oxford and New York: Oxford University Press. ISBN 0-19-504652-8.
- Nicol, Donald M. (1968). The Byzantine Family of Kantakouzenos (Cantacuzenus), ca. 1100–1460: A Genealogical and Prosopographical Study. Dumbarton Oaks studies 11. Washington, DC: Dumbarton Oaks Center for Byzantine Studies.
- Nicol, Donald M. (1993) [1972]. The Last Centuries of Byzantium, 1261–1453 (Second ed.). Cambridge: Cambridge University Press. ISBN 978-0-521-43991-6.
- Nicol, Donald M. (1996). The Reluctant Emperor: A Biography of John Cantacuzene, Byzantine Emperor and Monk, c. 1295-1383. Cambridge: Cambridge University Press. ISBN 9780521522014.
- Trapp, Erich; Beyer, Hans-Veit; Walther, Rainer; Sturm-Schnabl, Katja; Kislinger, Ewald; Leontiadis, Ioannis; Kaplaneres, Sokrates (1976–1996). Prosopographisches Lexikon der Palaiologenzeit (in German). Vienna: Verlag der Österreichischen Akademie der Wissenschaften. ISBN 3-7001-3003-1.

Matthew Asen Kantakouzenos Kantakouzenos dynasty Born: c. 1325 Died: June 1383
Regnal titles
Preceded by John V Palaiologos and John VI Kantakouzenos	Byzantine Emperor; 1353–1357 with John V Palaiologos (1341–1376); John VI Kantakouzenos (1347–1353)	Succeeded by John V Palaiologos
Preceded by Manuel Kantakouzenos	Despot of the Morea; 1380–1383	Succeeded by Demetrios I Kantakouzenos
