= Michael Kantakouzenos (died 1316) =

Michael Kantakouzenos (Greek: Μιχαὴλ Καντακουζηνός, romanized: Mikhaḗl Kantakouzēnós; died 1316) was the first epitropos ("steward, overseer") of the Byzantine province of the Morea, a position he held from 1308 till his death in 1316.

In 1308, Byzantine emperor Andronikos II Palaiologos passed a decree, which stopped the appointment of new governors of the Morea every year and that this position be given to one person until his death. After the decree was passed, the first epitropos the emperor appointed was Michael Kantakouzenos. His coming to the Morea was a blessing for the local population in the poor province because he stopped the practice of corrupt governors who tried to pull off a "get rich quick" scheme in their 12-month term. He enabled economic stabilization within the province in his short eight-year term, giving his successor, Andronikos Asen, the possibility of starting a war of conquest.

Michael Kantakouzenos married Theodora Palaiologina Angelina, possible daughter of General Chandrenos and wife Theodote Glabaina Tarchaneiotissa, and died in 1316. His son John became emperor in 1347. His wife died under house arrest in Constantinople on 6 January 1342 and was buried in the Convent of Kyra-Martha.

Political offices
| New creation | Epitropos of the Morea; 1308–1316 | Succeeded by Andronikos Asen |
