= Orhan =

Sultan of the Ottoman Empire from 1323/4 to 1362

- Ghazi; Bey
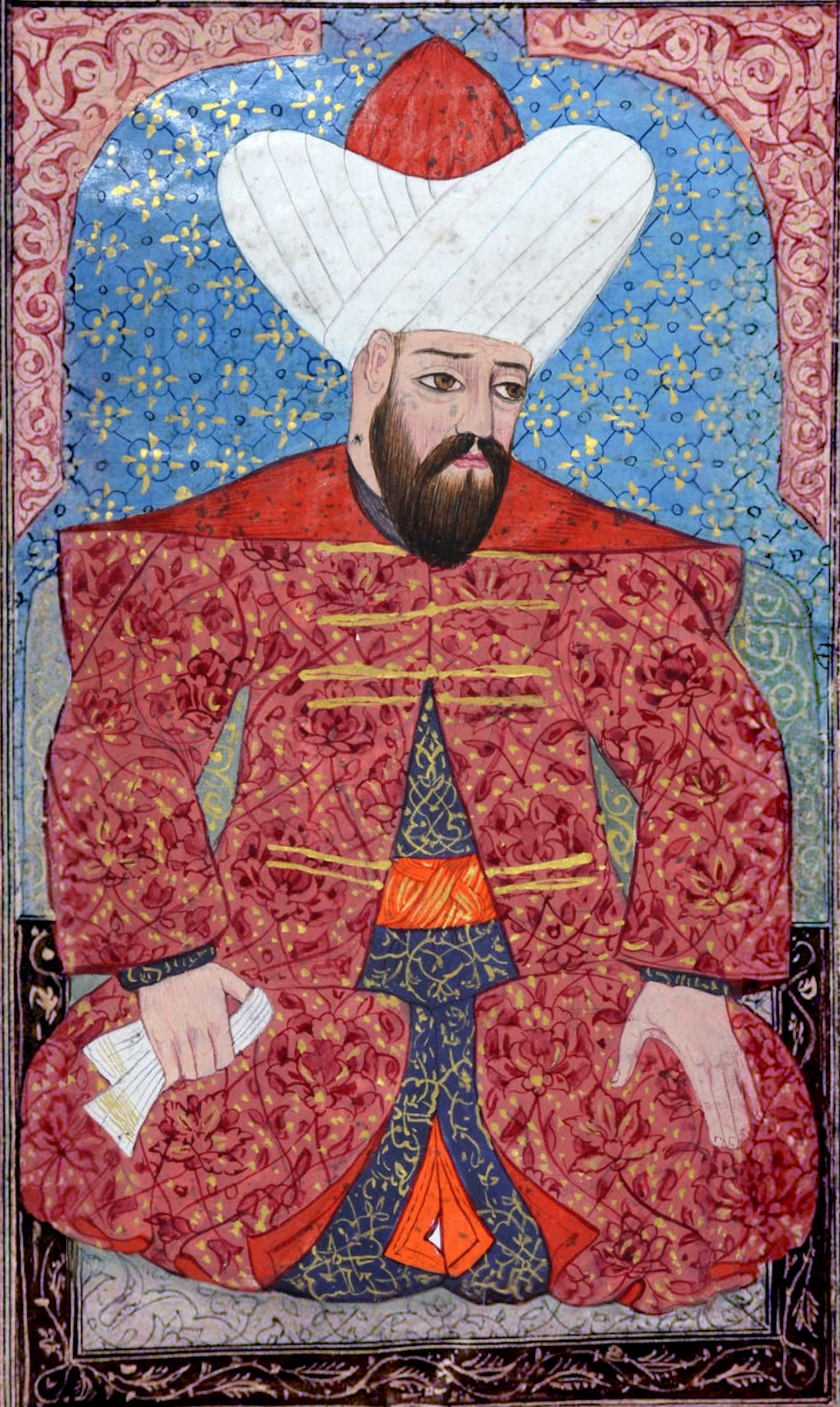
- 16th century Ottoman miniature of Orhan Ghazi

Sultan of the Ottoman Empire (Padishah)
- Reign: 1323/24–1362
- Predecessor: Osman I
- Successor: Murad I
- Born: Unknown
- Died: March 1362; Bursa, Ottoman Beylik
- Burial: Osmangazi, Bursa, Turkey
- Consorts: Nilüfer Hatun; Asporça Hatun; Theodora Hatun; Others
- Issue Among others: Süleyman Pasha; Murad I; Halil Bey
- Dynasty: Ottoman
- Father: Osman I
- Mother: Malhun Hatun
- Religion: Sunni Islam
- Tughra

Orhan Ghazi (Ottoman Turkish: اورخان غازی; Turkish: Orhan Gazi, also spelled Orkhan; died March 1362) was the second sultan of the Ottoman Empire from 1323/24 to 1362. He was born in Söğüt, as the son of Osman I and his consort Malhun Hatun.

In the early stages of his reign, Orhan focused his energies on conquering most of northwestern Anatolia. The majority of these areas were under Byzantine rule and he won his first battle at Pelekanon against the Byzantine Emperor Andronikos III Palaiologos. Orhan also occupied the lands of the Karasids of Balıkesir and the Ahis of Ankara.

A series of civil wars surrounding the ascension of the nine-year-old Byzantine emperor John V Palaiologos greatly benefited Orhan. In the Byzantine civil war of 1341–1347, the regent John VI Kantakouzenos married his daughter Theodora to Orhan and employed Ottoman warriors against the rival forces of the empress dowager, allowing them to loot Thrace. In the Byzantine civil war of 1352–1357, Kantakouzenos used Ottoman forces against John V, granting them the use of a European fortress at Çimpe around 1352. A major earthquake devastated Gallipoli (modern Gelibolu) two years later, after which Orhan's son, Süleyman Pasha, occupied the town, giving the Ottomans a strong bridgehead into mainland Europe.

According to the Muslim scholar Ibn Battuta, Orhan was "the greatest of the Turcoman kings and the richest in wealth, lands, and military forces".

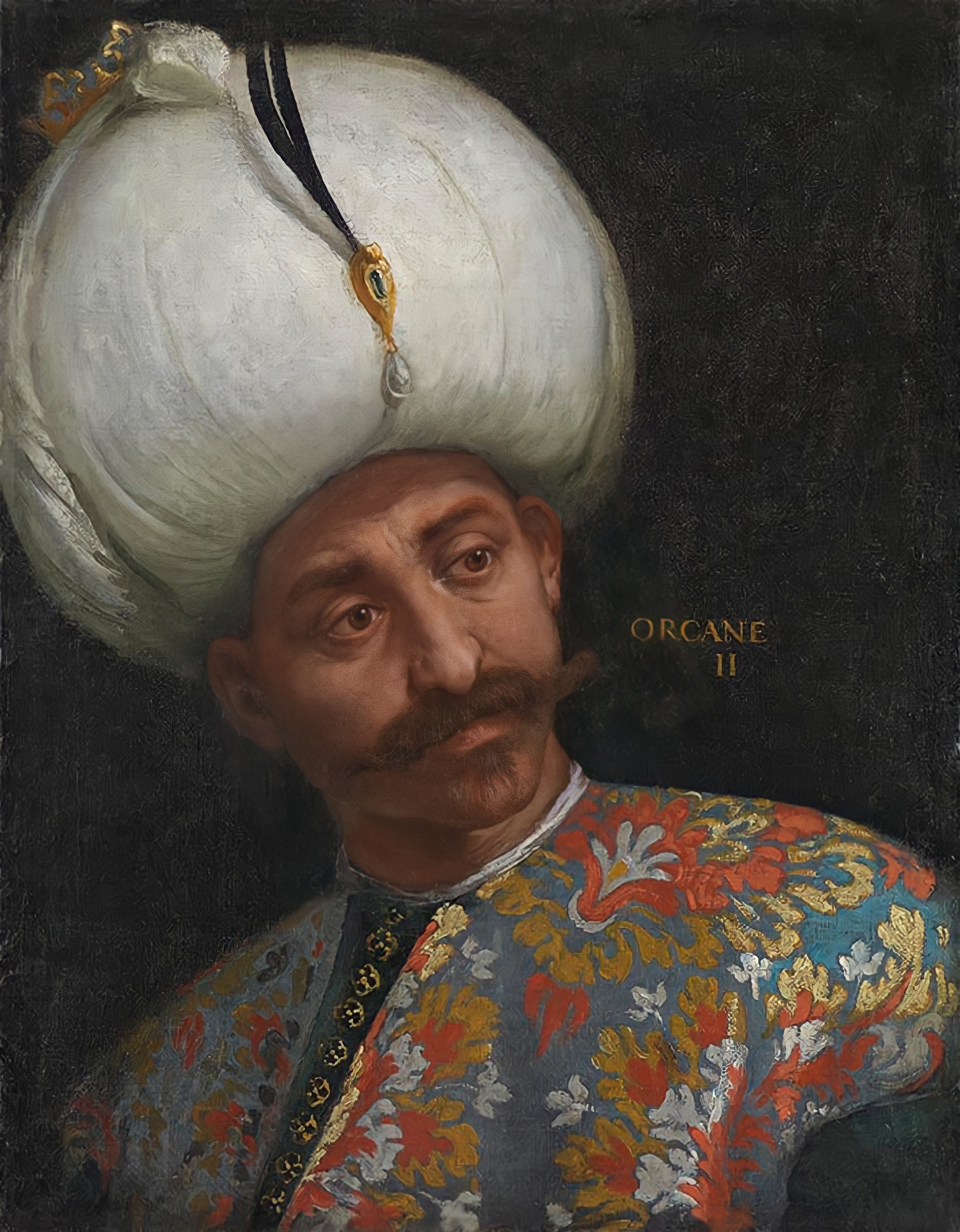
Portrait of Orhan Ghazi, drawn by the Venetian painter Paolo Veronese, 1553

== Passage of power ==
Osman Gazi died in either 1323 or 1324, and Orhan succeeded him. According to Ottoman tradition, when Orhan succeeded his father, he proposed to his brother, Alaeddin, that they should share the emerging beylik. The latter refused on the grounds that their father had designated Orhan as sole successor, and that the beylik should not be divided. He only accepted as his share the revenues of a single village near Bursa.

== Government ==
According to some authorities, it was in Alaeddin's time, and by his advice, that the Ottomans ceased acting like vassals to the Seljuk ruler: they no longer stamped money with his image or used his name in public prayers. These changes are attributed by others to Osman himself, but the vast majority of the oriental writers concur in attributing to Alaeddin the introduction of laws respecting the costume of the various subjects of the empire, and the creation and funding of a standing army of regular troops. It was by his advice and that of a contemporary Turkish statesman that the celebrated corps of Janissaries was formed, an institution which European writers erroneously fix at a later date, and ascribe to his son, Murad I.

=== Janissaries ===
Alaeddin, by his military legislation, may be truly said to have organized victory for the Ottoman dynasty. He organised for the Ottoman Beylik a standing army of regularly paid and disciplined infantry and horses, a full century before Charles VII of France established his fifteen permanent companies of men-at-arms, which are generally regarded as the first modern standing army.

Orhan's predecessors, Ertuğrul and Osman I, had made war at the head of the armed vassals and volunteers. This army rode on horseback to their prince's banner when summoned for each expedition, and was disbanded as soon as a campaign was over. Alaeddin determined to ensure success in future wards by forming a corps of paid infantry, which was to be kept in constant readiness for service. These troops were called Yaya, or piyade. They were divided into tens, hundreds, and thousands with their commanders. Their pay was high, and their pride soon caused their sovereign some anxiety. Orhan wished to provide a check on them, and he took counsel for this purpose with his brother Alaeddin and Kara Khalil Çandarlı (of House of Candar), who was connected with the royal house by marriage. Çandarlı laid before his master and the vizier a project. Out of this arose the renowned corps of Janissaries, which was considered the scourge of the Balkans and Central Europe for a long time, until it was abolished by Sultan Mahmud II in 1826.

Çandarlı proposed to Orhan to create the Janissary corps, an army entirely composed of the children of conquered places. Çandarlı argued that:

The conquered are the responsibility of the conqueror, who is the lawful ruler of them, of their lands, of their goods, of their wives, and of their children. We have a right to do, same as what we do with our own; and the treatment which I propose is not only lawful, but benevolent. By enforcing the enrolling them in the ranks of the army, we consult both their temporal and eternal interests, as they will be educated and given better life conditions.

He also claimed that incorporating children of the conquered would induce other people to enlist: their friends and relations, who would come as volunteers to join the Ottoman ranks. Acting on this advice, Orhan selected a thousand of the finest boys from conquered Christian families. The recruits were trained according to their individual abilities, and employed in posts ranging from professional soldier to Grand Vizier. This practice continued for centuries, until the reign of Sultan Mehmed IV.

== Politics ==
=== Initial expansion ===
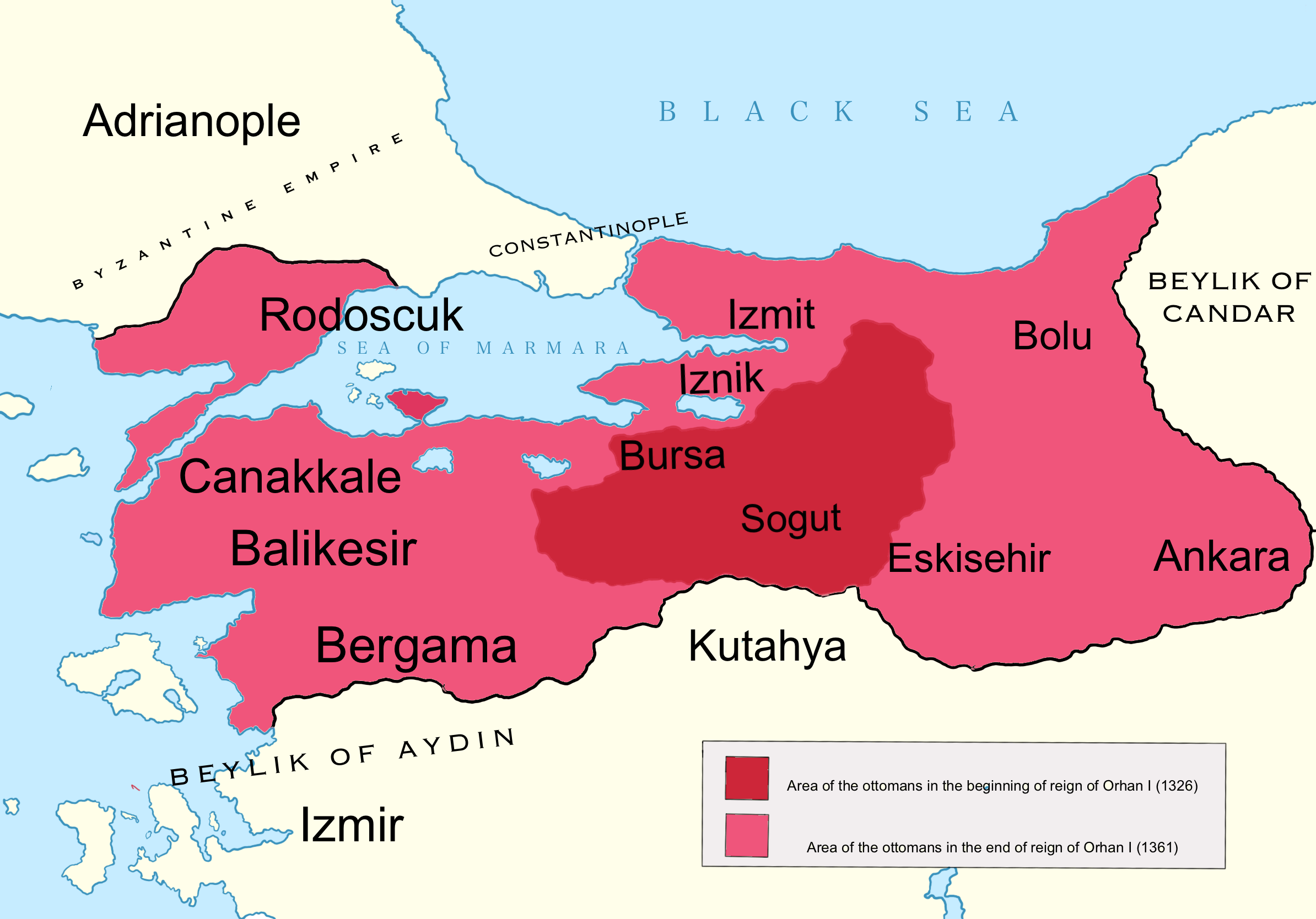
Ottoman Beylik around 1355, during Orhan's reign.

Orhan invaded Byzantine territories in northwest Anatolia. First, in 1321, Orhan captured Mudanya, the port linking the city of Bursa to the Sea of Marmara coast. He then sent a column under Konur Alp towards the west Black Sea coast; another column under Akça Koca to capture Kocaeli, and finally a column under Abdurrahman Ghazi to capture the southeast coast of the Sea of Marmara. Then, he captured Bursa by persuading its Byzantine commander to defect. As Evrenos Bey, he became a commander of light cavalry, and he and his sons and grandsons led Ottoman troops in the Balkans. Once Bursa was captured, Orhan sent cavalry towards the Bosphorus, capturing Byzantine towns on the Marmara coast. There were even sightings of Ottoman light cavalry along the Bosphorus coast, and Ottoman forces laid siege to Nicaea (second only to Constantinople in the Byzantine Empire).

In 1329, Byzantine Emperor Andronikos III led a mercenary army to relieve Nicaea and regain Kocaeli. In the ensuing battle of Pelekanon (near Nicomedia, Bithynia; present day Maltepe, Turkey), on 10 or 15 June, Orhan's disciplined troops routed the Byzantines. Thereafter Andronikos abandoned the idea of getting Kocaeli back and never again conducted a field battle against Ottoman forces.

Nicaea surrendered to Orhan after a three-year siege that concluded in 1331. Orhan captured Nicomedia in 1337. Orhan gave the command of Nicomedia to his eldest son, Suleyman Pasha, who had directed the operations of the siege.

In 1338, Orhan captured Scutari; most of northwest Anatolia was in Ottoman hands. The Byzantines still controlled the coastal strip from Şile on the Black Sea to Scutari and the city of Amastris (now Amasra) in Paphlagonia, but these were so scattered and isolated as to be no threat to the Ottomans.

In 1345, there was a change of strategy. Instead of aiming to gain land from non-Muslims, Orhan took over a Turkish principality, Karesi (present Balıkesir and surroundings). According to the Islamic philosophy of war, areas under Islamic rule were to be abodes of peace and the other areas abodes of war. Conducting a war in abodes of war was considered a good deed. Karesi principality was a state governed by a Turkish emir and its main inhabitants were Turkish so it was an abode of peace. The Ottomans had to have special justification for conquering fellow Muslim Turkish principalities.

In the case of Karesi, the ruler had died and had left two sons whose claims to the post of emir were equally valid. So there was a fight between the armed supporters of the two claimant princes. Orhan's pretext for invasion was that he was acting as a bringer of peace. In the end of the invasion by Ottoman troops the two brothers were pushed to the castle of their capital city of Pergamum (now Bergama). One was killed and the other was captured. The territories around Pergamum and Palaeocastro (Balıkesir) were annexed to Orhan's domains. This conquest was particularly important since it brought Orhan's territories to Çanakkale, the Anatolian side of the Dardanelles Straits.

With the conquest of Karesi, nearly the whole of northwestern Anatolia was included in the Ottoman Beylik, and the four cities of Bursa, Nicomedia, Nicaea, and Pergamum had become strongholds of its power. At this stage of his conquests, Orhan's Ottoman Principality had four provinces:

1. Original land grant area of Söğüt and Eskişehir;
2. Hüdavendigar (Domain of the Sultan) area of Bursa and İznik;
3. Koca Eli peninsular area around İzmit;
4. former principality of Karesi around Balıkesir and Bergama.

=== Consolidation period ===
Silver coins of Orhan

A twenty-year period of peace followed the acquisition of Karesi. During this time, the Ottoman sovereign was actively occupied in perfecting the civil and military institutions which his brother had introduced, in securing internal order, in founding and endowing mosques and schools, and in the construction of vast public edifices, many of which still stand. Orhan did not continue with any other conquests in Anatolia except taking over Ankara from the commercial-religious fraternity guild of Ahis.

The general diffusion of Turkish populations over Anatolia, before Osman's time, was in main part a push from the Mongol conquest of Central Asia, Iran and then East Anatolia. Turkish peoples had founded a number of principalities after the demise of the Anatolian Sultanate of Rum, after its defeat by the Ilkhanate Mongols. Although they were all of Turkish stock, they were all rivals for dominant status in Anatolia.

After the Byzantine defeat of the Battle of Pelekanon, Orhan developed friendly relations with Andronicus III Palaeologus, and maintained them with some of his successors. Therefore, the Ottoman power experienced a twenty-year period of general repose.

However, as the Byzantine civil war of 1341–1347 dissipated the last resources of the Byzantine Empire, the auxiliary armies of the Emirs of Turkish principalities were frequently called over and employed in Europe. In 1346, Emperor John VI Cantacuzene recognised Orhan as the most powerful sovereign of the Turks. He aspired to attach the Ottoman forces permanently to his interests, and hoped to achieve this by giving his second daughter, Theodora, in marriage to their ruler, despite differences of creed and the disparity of age. However, in Byzantine and in Western European history, dynastic marriages were quite usual and there are many examples which were much more strange.

The splendour of the wedding between Orhan and Theodora at Selymbria (Silivri) is elaborately described by Byzantine writers. In the following year, Orhan and Theodora visited his imperial father-in-law at Üsküdar, (then Chrysopolis) the suburb of Constantinople on the Asiatic side of the Bosporus where there was a display of festive splendor. However, this close relationship soured when Byzantines suffered from marauding migrant Turcoman bands that had crossed the Marmara Sea and Dardanelles and pillaged several towns in Thrace. After a series of such raids, the Byzantines had to use superior forces to deal with them.

Ibn Battuta gave the following account of Orhan during his reign:

The greatest of the kings of the Turcomans and the richest in wealth, lands and military forces. Of fortresses he possesses nearly a hundred, and for most of his time he is continually engaged in making a round of them, staying in each fortress for some days to put it in good order and examine its condition. It is said that he has never stayed for a whole month in any one town. He also fights with the infidels continually and keeps them under siege.

— Ibn Battuta

=== Decline of the Byzantine Empire ===
During Orhan's reign as the Ottoman emir, the Byzantine Empire declined – partly due to the ambitions of Italian maritime states and to the aggression of the Turcomans and other Turcoman states, but also due to civil wars within the empire.

During these years the Byzantine Empire became so weak that commercial supremacy in the surrounding seas around it became a bone of contention for the Italian maritime commercial city states. The Republic of Genoa possessed Galata, a separate Genoese city across the Golden Horn from Constantinople itself. The Genoese had fought the Byzantines earlier in 1348 when the Byzantines had decreased their customs tariffs in order to attract trade to the Byzantine side of the Golden Horn. In 1352 the rivalry for trade led to a war between Genoa and Venice. The Genoese, in resisting a Venetian fleet attacking their ships in the Golden Horn, bombarded the sea walls of Constantinople and pushed the Byzantines to ally with the Venetians. The Venetians assembled a large naval force, including hired fleets from Peter IV of Aragon and from the Byzantine Empire of John VI Cantacuzene. The sea battle between the Venetian fleet under the command of Niccolo Pisani and the Genoese fleet under Paganino Doria led to defeat of the Venetians and their Byzantine allies. Orhan opposed the Venetians, whose fleets and piratical raids were disrupting his seaward provinces, and who had met his diplomatic overtures with contempt. The Venetians were allies of John VI, so Orhan sent an auxiliary force across the straits to Galata, which there co-operated with the Genoese.

In the midst of the distress and confusion that the Byzantine Empire now suffered, Orhan's eldest son, Suleyman Pasha, captured the Castle of Tzympe (Cinbi) in a bold move which gave the Turks a permanent foothold on the European side of the Dardanelles Straits. He also started to settle migrant Turcomans and town-dwelling Turks in the strategic city and castle of Gelibolu (Gallipoli), which had been devastated by a severe earthquake and was therefore evacuated by its inhabitants. Suleyman refused various financial inducements offered by John VI to empty the castle and the city. The emperor pleaded with his son-in-law Orhan to meet personally and discuss the matter, but the request was either rejected or could not be carried out due to Orhan's age and ill health.

This military situation remained unresolved, in part because of the eruption of hostilities between John VI and his co-emperor and son-in-law John V Palaiologos. John V was dismissed from his imperial post and exiled to Tenedos; Cantacuzene's son Matthew was crowned as the co-emperor. But very soon John V returned from exile with Venetian help and conducted a coup, taking over the government of Constantinople. Although the two men came to an agreement to share power, John VI resigned from his imperial post and became a monk. Each of these two contestants for power was continually soliciting Orhan's aid against the other, and Orhan supported whichever side would benefit the Ottomans.

=== Last years ===
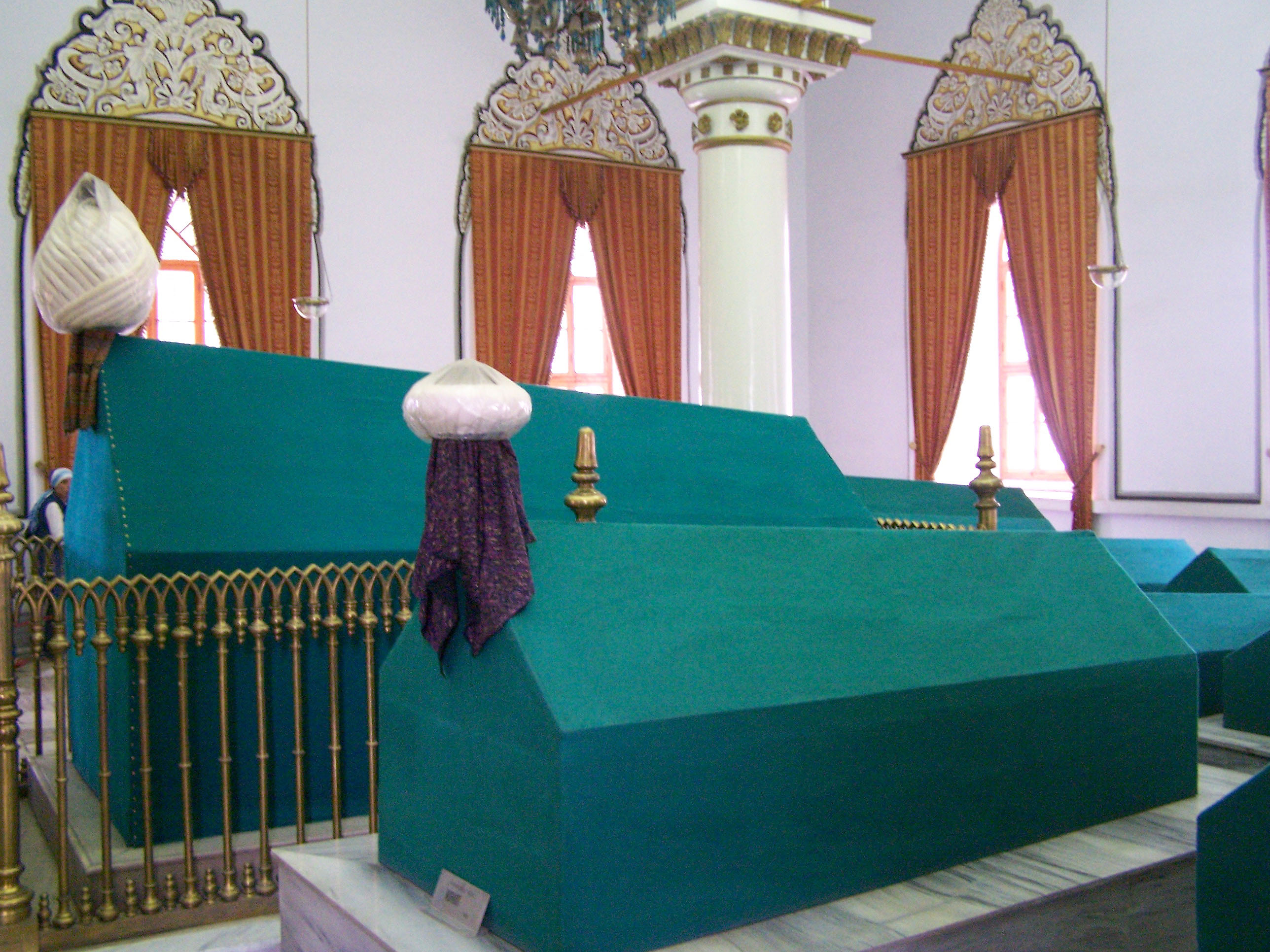
The türbe of Orhan Gazi in Bursa

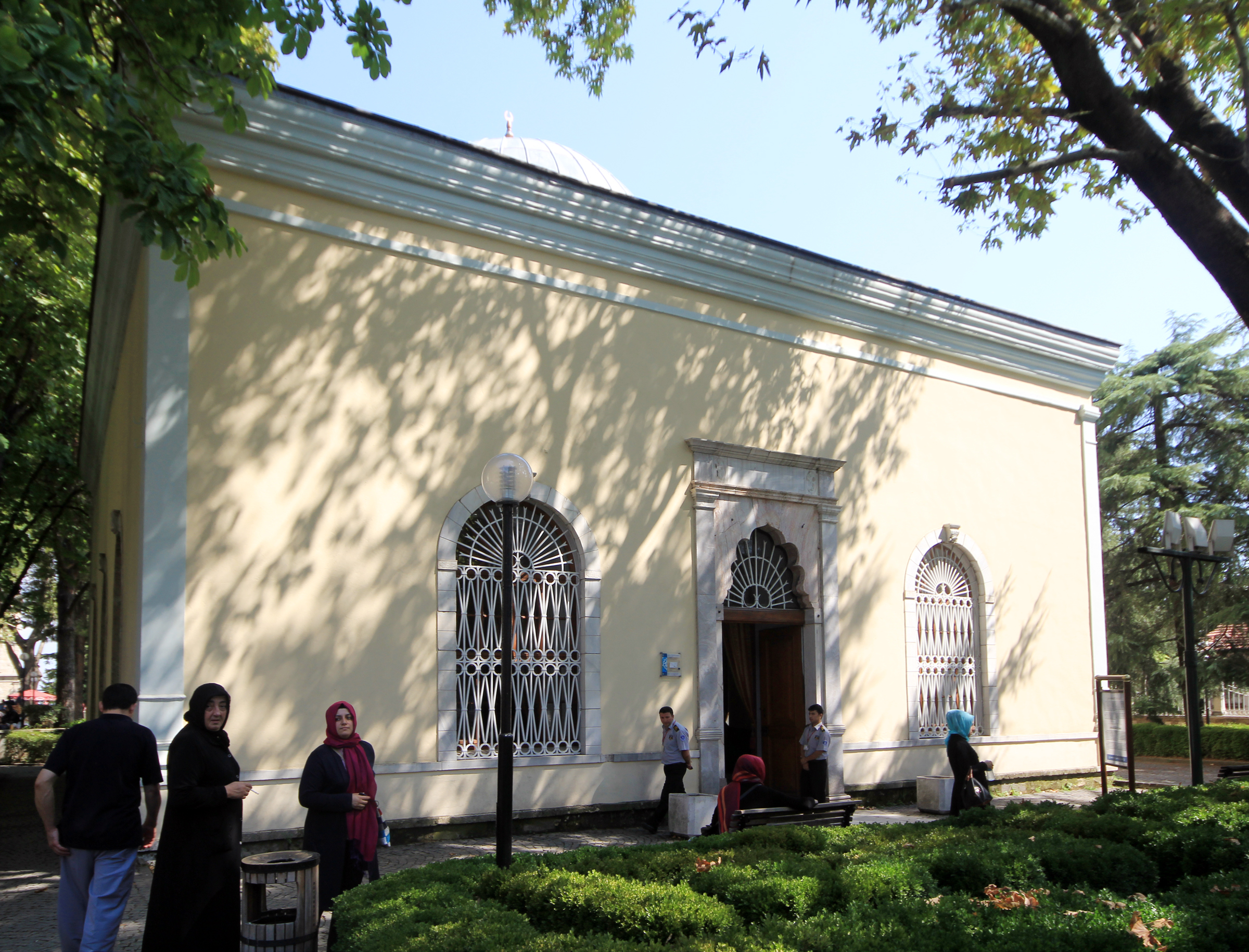
The exterior view of his türbe in Bursa.

Orhan was the longest living and one of the longest reigning of the future Ottoman Sultans. In his last years he had left most of the powers of state in the hands of his second son Murad and lived a secluded life in Bursa.

In 1356 Orhan and Theodora's son, Halil, was abducted somewhere on the Bay of Izmit. A Genoese commercial boat captain, which was conducting acts of piracy alongside commercial activity, was able to capture the young prince and take him over to Phocaea on the Aegean Sea, which was under Genoese rule. Orhan was greatly upset by this kidnapping and conducted talks with his brother-in-law and now sole Byzantine Emperor John V Palaeologos. As to the agreement, John V with a Byzantine naval fleet went to Phocaea, paid the ransom demanded of 100,000 hyperpyra, and brought Halil back to Ottoman territory.

In 1357 Orhan's eldest and most experienced son and likely heir, Suleyman Pasha, died after injuries sustained from a fall from a horse near Bolayir on the coast of the sea of Marmara. The horse that Suleyman fell from was buried alongside him and their tombs can still be seen today. Orhan was said to have been greatly affected by the death of his son.

Orhan died soon after, likely from natural causes. Orhan died in 1362, in Bursa, at the age of eighty, after a reign of thirty-six years. He is buried in the türbe (tomb) with his wife and children, called Gümüşlü Kumbet in Bursa.

== Family ==
=== Consorts ===
Orhan had at least four consorts:

- Nilüfer Hatun – According to traditional accounts, she was the daughter of the Byzantine governor of Yarhisar; it is certain she entered Orhan's harem as a slave concubine. She was the mother of Murad I, who succeeded Orhan as Ottoman sultan.
- Asporça Hatun – Byzantine noblewoman and Orhan's first legal wife. She was the mother of İbrahim Bey, Şerefullah Bey, Selçuk Hatun and Fatma Hatun.
- Theodora Kantakouzene – Daughter of John VI Kantakouzenos and Orhan's second legal wife. She married Orhan in 1346, and some sources identify her as the mother of Halil Bey, although this is disputed.
- Bayalun Hatun – Also known as Baylun, Bilun, Suilun, Biliven, and Niliven. In 1331, she welcomed Ibn Battuta in İznik. Many historians identify her with Nilüfer Hatun, suggesting that Bayalun was another name or title for her. However, some historians argue that Bayalun Hatun was a different woman from both Nilüfer Hatun and Asporça Hatun.

Some historians have also suggested that the following women may have been among Orhan's wives, although these marriages remain unconfirmed.

- Efendize Hatun – The daughter of Akbaşlı Gündüz Bey, Osman I's brother, and therefore Orhan's first cousin. Some modern historians identify her as a possible wife of Orhan and suggest that she may have been the mother of Süleyman Pasha.
- Theodora Uroš (1340–1352/1354). Daughter of Stefan IV Dušan and Helena of Bulgaria. According to some accounts, she married Orhan in 1351, although the historicity of this marriage remains disputed.

=== Sons ===
Orhan had at least seven sons:

- Fülan Sultan Bey (1304–1347): The 1324 Mekece foundation deed lists him as Orhan's first son.
- Süleyman Pasha (c.1306–1357; buried in Süleyman Pasha's Tomb, Bolayır) – possibly with Efendize Hatun. Orhan's favorite son, he was at the head of the expansion campaigns in Thrace and Rumelia. He died of wounds sustained after a fall from his horse.
- İbrahim Bey (1310–1362; buried in Osman I's Tomb, Bursa) – with Asporça Hatun. Governor of Eskişehir, was executed with his sons by the order of his half-brother Murad I.
- Şerefullah Bey – with Asporça Hatun
- Kasım Bey (d. 1346; buried in Bursa)
- Murad I (1326–1389) – with Nilüfer Hatun; succeeded his father to the throne.
- Halil Bey (1347–1362) – possibly with Theodora Kantakouzene. As a child, he was kidnapped by Genoese pirates and ransomed with the help of John V Palaeologus, his mother's brother-in-law. Subsequently, he married John's daughter, Irene. After his father's death, he was executed by his half-brother Murad I.

=== Daughters ===
Orhan had at least three daughters:

- Hatice Hatun. She married Süleyman Bey, son of Saru Batu Savci Bey and cousin of Orhan. They had two sons, Hamza Bey (who had a son, Mehmed Bey) and Mustafa Bey (who had a son, Osman Bey), and two daughters, Ilaldi Hatun and Fatma Hatun.
- Selçuk Hatun – with Asporça Hatun. She married Süleyman Bey, son of Mehmed of Aydin.
- Fatma Hatun (buried in Orhan Gazi's Tomb, Bursa) – with Asporça Hatun

== See also ==
- Orhan Gazi Mosque

Orhan House of Osman
Regnal titles
Preceded by Osman I	Ottoman Sultan (Bey); 1323/4 – 1362	Succeeded by Murad I
