= John VI Kantakouzenos =

Byzantine emperor from 1347 to 1354

- Emperor and Autocrat of the Romans
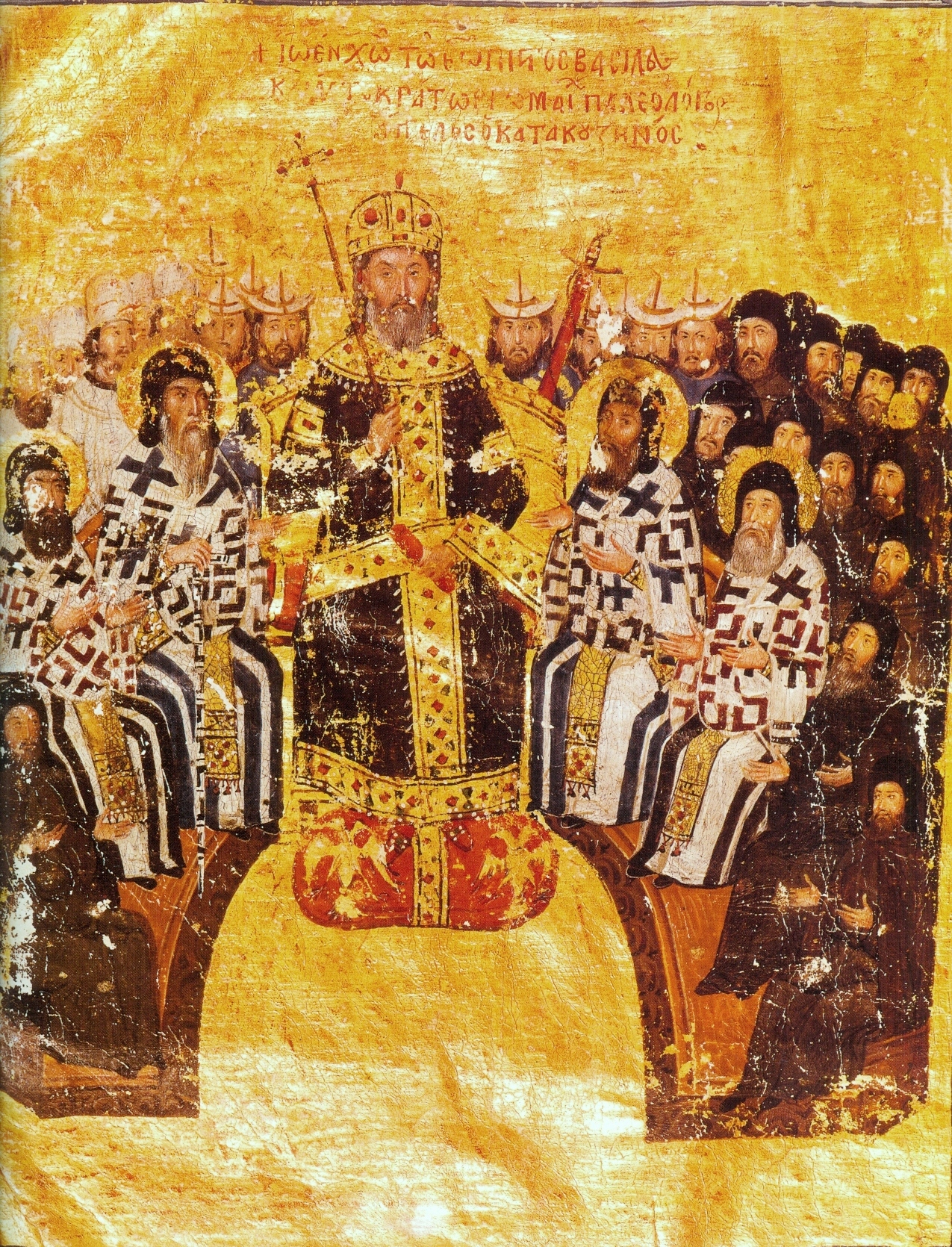
- John VI presiding over a synod, c. 1370–1375

Byzantine emperor
- Reign: 8 February 1347 – 10 December 1354
- Coronation: 21 May 1347
- Predecessor: John V Palaiologos (alone)
- Successor: John V Palaiologos (alongside Matthew)
- Co-monarch: John V Palaiologos; Matthew Asen Kantakouzenos
- Born: 6 May 1292; Constantinople, Byzantine Empire
- Died: 15 June 1383 (aged 91); Despotate of the Morea
- Spouse: Irene Asanina
- Issue: Matthew Asen Kantakouzenos; Manuel Kantakouzenos; Theodora Kantakouzene; Helena Kantakouzene; Andronikos Kantakouzenos; Maria Kantakouzene
Names
- John Angelos [Komnenos] Palaiologos Kantakouzenos; Ἰωάννης Ἄγγελος [Κομνηνός] Παλαιολόγος Καντακουζηνός
- House: Kantakouzenos
- Father: Michael Kantakouzenos
- Mother: Theodora Palaiologina Angelina
- Religion: Greek Orthodox

John VI Kantakouzenos or Cantacuzene (Greek: Ἰωάννης Ἄγγελος [Κομνηνός] Παλαιολόγος Καντακουζηνός, romanized: Iōánnēs Ángelos [Komnēnós] Palaiológos Kantakouzēnós; Latin: Iohannes Cantacuzenus; 6 May 1292 – 15 June 1383) was a Byzantine emperor and nobleman, statesman, and general. He served as grand domestic under Andronikos III Palaiologos and regent for John V Palaiologos before reigning as Byzantine emperor in his own right from 1347 to 1354. Deposed by his former ward, he was forced to retire to a monastery under the name Joasaph Christodoulos (Greek: Ἰωάσαφ Χριστόδουλος, romanized: Joásaph Christódoulos) and spent the remainder of his life as a monk and historian. Aged 91 at his death, he was the longest-lived of the Roman emperors. His two disastrous civil wars led to the loss of much of the remaining territory in the Balkans under Byzantine control to the Serbian and Bulgarian empires, but the most severe loss during his civil war was the loss of the Gallipoli peninsula to the Ottoman Turks, allowing the Ottomans to gain territory in Europe and setting the stage for the destruction of the Byzantine Empire a century later.

== Early life ==
Born in Constantinople, John Kantakouzenos was the son of Michael Kantakouzenos, governor of the Morea; Donald Nicol speculates that he may have been born after his father's death and raised as an only child. Through his mother Theodora Palaiologina Angelina, he was related to the then-reigning house of Palaiologos. He was also related to the imperial dynasty through his wife Irene Asanina, a second cousin of Emperor Andronikos III Palaiologos. Kantakouzenos became a close friend to Andronikos III and was one of his principal supporters in Andronikos's struggle against his grandfather, Andronikos II Palaiologos. On the accession of Andronikos III in 1328, he was entrusted with the supreme administration of affairs and served as grand domestic throughout his reign. He was named regent to Andronikos's successor, the 9-year-old John V, upon the emperor's death in June 1341.

Kantakouzenos apparently began with no imperial ambitions of his own, having refused several times to be crowned co-emperor by Andronikos III. After the death of the emperor, Kantakouzenos again refused to take the throne, insisting on the legitimacy of John V's claim and contenting himself with overseeing the empire's administration until the boy came of age: according to the history written by John VI himself. Whether he would have remained loyal is unknowable but, despite his professed devotion to John V and his mother Anna, she came to suspect him of treason. His close friendship with the late emperor and power over his successor had aroused the jealousy of his former protégés, Patriarch John XIV of Constantinople and Alexios Apokaukos; after a series of failed attempts, they succeeded in overthrowing his regency in September 1341 while he was out of the capital readying an army against the Crusader principalities that still held parts of the Peloponnesus. He attempted to negotiate with the usurpers, but this was rebuffed and his army was ordered to disband. Further, his relatives in Constantinople were driven into exile or imprisoned, with their property confiscated by the new regents. His mother Theodora died owing to the mistreatment she suffered while under house arrest. His army ignored the new regents' orders and proclaimed Kantakouzenos emperor at Didymoteichon in Thrace as John VI. He accepted this, while continuing to style himself as the junior ruler to John V.

== Civil war ==
The ensuing civil war lasted six years; calling in foreign allies and mercenaries of every description, the two sides completely disrupted and almost ruined the empire. At first, John VI marched to Thessalonica, which the ruling families planned to hand over to him. Apokaukos anticipated this move and sent a fleet to reinforce the city, obliging John to flee to Serbia, where Stefan Dušan sheltered him and lent him military support. This proved largely ineffectual, and only the intervention of John's old friend and ally Umur of Aydin broke the regency's siege of his headquarters at Didymoteichon.

During another attempt to capture Thessalonica the following year, the Serbs switched sides to support the regency, leaving John stranded once more outside that city. Yet again, Umur came to his rescue, and their combined forces broke out of Macedonia to return to Didymoteichon. The war dragged on for another four years as neither side could dislodge the other, although time was on John VI's side. He struck a bargain with the Ottoman Turks, giving Orhan Bey his daughter, Theodora, in marriage and permitting him to take Greek Christians as slaves. The Greco-Turkish force prevailed and John VI entered Constantinople in triumph on 8 February 1347. (Note: His entry into the city later formed the subject of Constantine Cavafy's poem "John Kantakouzenos Triumphs".) Empress Anna and John VI agreed that the latter would rule as senior emperor for ten years, after which John V would reach adulthood and share power as an equal to Kantakouzenos. The formal coronation of John VI took place on 21 May.

== Reign ==
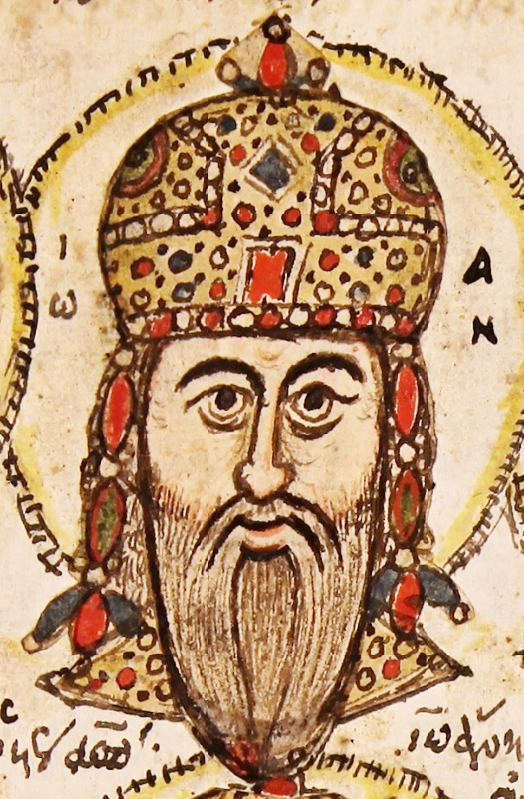
15th century portrait of John VI Kantakouzenos from the codex mutinensis.

During John's reign, the empire—already fragmented, impoverished, and weakened—continued to be assailed on every side.

The Genoese, disregarding the terms of the treaty which permitted their colony at Galata, began fortifying and arming it. Their customs dues undercut the Byzantines and meant that as much as 87% of the revenue from control of the Bosphorus went to them instead of the empire. John VI attempted to rebuild the shattered Byzantine navy in preparation for the war he expected to follow a reduction of Constantinople's own customs dues. He was able to borrow enough to construct 9 fair-sized ships and about 100 smaller ones before he lowered the rates and began siphoning off Genoa's income. When they did declare war, however, they were able to sink or capture his fleet by early 1349. The Genoese were forced to negotiate after major areas of Galata were burnt, including its wharves and warehouses, but the Byzantine Empire thenceforth was forced to turn to an alliance with the Republic of Venice for naval protection. This led to their involvement in Venice's 1350 war against Genoa, but Paganino Doria was able to force John VI (and the twelve ships he had fielded) out of the war by a Pyrrhic victory off Constantinople the next year.

In 1351, Kantakouzenos oversaw the Fifth Council of Constantinople, wherein Gregory Palamas' mystical hesychastic theology was declared Orthodox over the objections of Barlaam of Calabria and other Byzantine philosophers.

By this time, Stefan Dušan had taken Albania, Macedonia, and Epirus. John VI secured help against further incursions by again allying with the Turks. Following an earthquake, they annexed Callipolis (Gallipoli)—their first foothold in Europe—in partial payment of his many debts in 1354.

He made his son Matthew Asen Kantakouzenos another co-emperor in 1353, but John VI's attempts to expand taxation to repay the government's debts had long been displeasing. He was soon removed from power by John V, becoming a monk on 10 December 1354. (Note: Some sources give the date as 3/4 December, such as in the Oxford Dictionary of Byzantium. However, 9/10 December is most definitely the correct date. The Prosopographisches Lexikon der Palaiologenzeit gives 9 December, the day in which John announced his abdication. The actual ceremony took place the day after, during sunrise.)

== Retirement ==
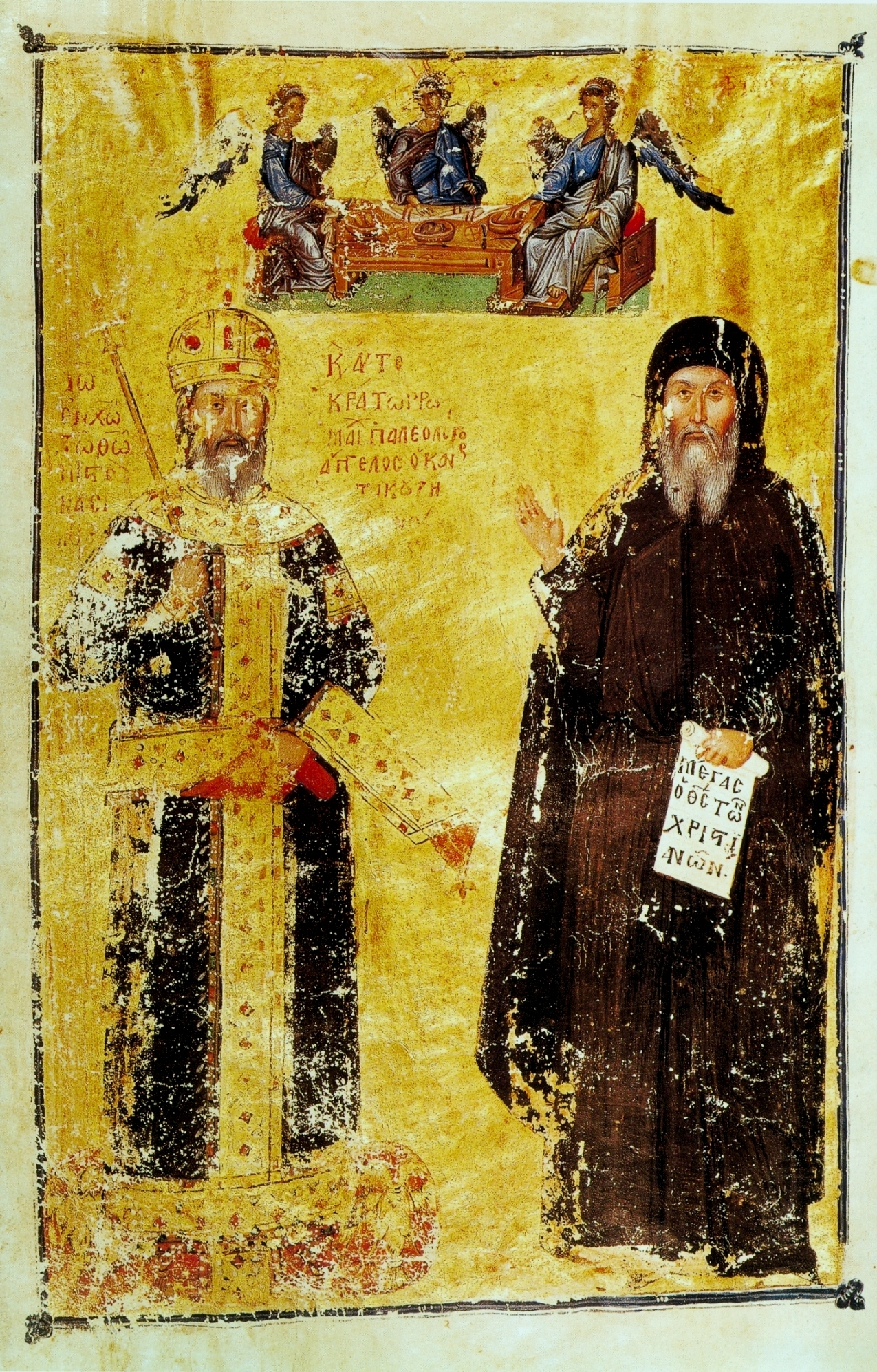
John VI as emperor (left) and monk (right)

Kantakouzenos retired to a monastery, where he assumed the name of Joasaph Christodoulos and occupied himself with literary labors, which have been called eloquent. His 4-volume History of the years 1320–1356 served as an apologia for his actions. They are therefore not always trustworthy, including defects in matters where he was not personally involved, but are supplemented by the contemporary work of Nicephorus Gregoras. It is nevertheless remarkable for being the only surviving account any Byzantine emperor gave of his own reign.

In 1367 Joasaph was appointed the representative of the Eastern Orthodox Church to negotiate with the Latin Patriarch Paul to attempt a reconciliation of the Eastern Orthodox and Catholic churches. They agreed to call a grand ecumenical council to be attended by the Pope and all the patriarchs, archbishops, and bishops of both the eastern and western churches. This plan was subsequently refused by Pope Urban V and eventually nothing came of it.

Kantakouzenos withdrew to the Peloponnese as a monk. There is no record of Kantakouzenos's burial, but it is possible that he was buried in one of the monasteries established by his son Manuel.

== Family ==
By his wife Irene Asanina, a daughter of Andronikos Asen (son of Ivan Asen III of Bulgaria by Irene Palaiologina, Empress of Bulgaria, herself daughter of Michael VIII Palaiologos), John VI Kantakouzenos had six children:

- Matthew Asen Kantakouzenos (c. 1325–1383), co-emperor 1353–1357, later Despot of the Morea.
- Manuel Kantakouzenos (c. 1326–1380), Despot of the Morea.
- Theodora Kantakouzene (c. 1330 – c. 1396), who married Sultan Orhan of the Ottoman Empire.
- Helena Kantakouzene (1333–1396), who married John V Palaiologos.
- Andronikos Kantakouzenos (c. 1334 – c. 1347), who died in the Black Death epidemic.
- Maria Kantakouzene (dead after 1379), who married Nikephoros II Orsini of Epirus.

== Works ==
Kantakouzenos's four-volume History was published by Johannes Isacius Pontanus in 1603, by Ludwig Schopen at Bonn as part of the Corpus Scriptorum Historiae Byzantinae c. 1830, and by Jacques Paul Migne at Paris. He also wrote a commentary on the first five books of Aristotle's Ethics and several controversial theological treatises, including a defense of Hesychasm and a work titled Against Mohammedanism printed in Migne.

== See also ==
- Demetrios Kydones
- List of Byzantine emperors

== Sources ==
- Baynes, T. S., ed. (1878), "Johannes Cantacuzenus" , Encyclopædia Britannica, vol. 5 (9th ed.), New York: Charles Scribner's Sons, p. 27
- Chisholm, Hugh, ed. (1911), "John VI or V" , Encyclopædia Britannica, vol. 15 (11th ed.), Cambridge University Press, pp. 438–439
- Oxford Dictionary of Byzantium, Oxford: Oxford University Press, 1991
- Harris, Jonathan (2015), The Lost World of Byzantium, New Haven: Yale University Press
- Migne (ed.). Patrologia Graeca (in Latin). Vol. CLIII & CLIV. & (in Greek)
- Nicol, Donald M. (1968). The Byzantine Family of Kantakouzenos (Cantacuzenus), ca. 1100–1460: A Genealogical and Prosopographical Study. Dumbarton Oaks studies 11. Washington, DC: Dumbarton Oaks Center for Byzantine Studies.
- Nicol, Donald M. (1993) [1972]. The Last Centuries of Byzantium, 1261–1453 (Second ed.). Cambridge: Cambridge University Press. ISBN 978-0-521-43991-6.
- Nicol, Donald M. (1996). The Reluctant Emperor: A Biography of John Cantacuzene, Byzantine Emperor and Monk, c. 1295–1383. Cambridge: Cambridge University Press. ISBN 9780521522014.
- Sherrard, Philip (1966). Byzantium. Time Life Education. pp. 74–75
- Sugar, Peter F. (1996). Southeastern Europe Under Ottoman Rule, 1354–1804. University of Washington Press.
- Teteriatnikov, Natalia (2013). "The Mosaics of the Eastern Arch of Hagia Sophia in Constantinople: Program and Liturgy". Gesta. 52: 61–84. doi:10.1086/669685. S2CID 188005589 – via The University of Chicago Press Journals.

John VI Kantakouzenos Kantakouzenos dynasty Born: 1292 Died: 15 June 1383
Regnal titles
Preceded by John V Palaiologos	Byzantine emperor 1347–1353 with John V Palaiologos (1341–1376); Matthew Asen Kantakouzenos (1353–1357)	Succeeded by John V Palaiologos
