= John V Palaiologos =

Byzantine emperor (1332–1391)

- Emperor and Autocrat of the Romans
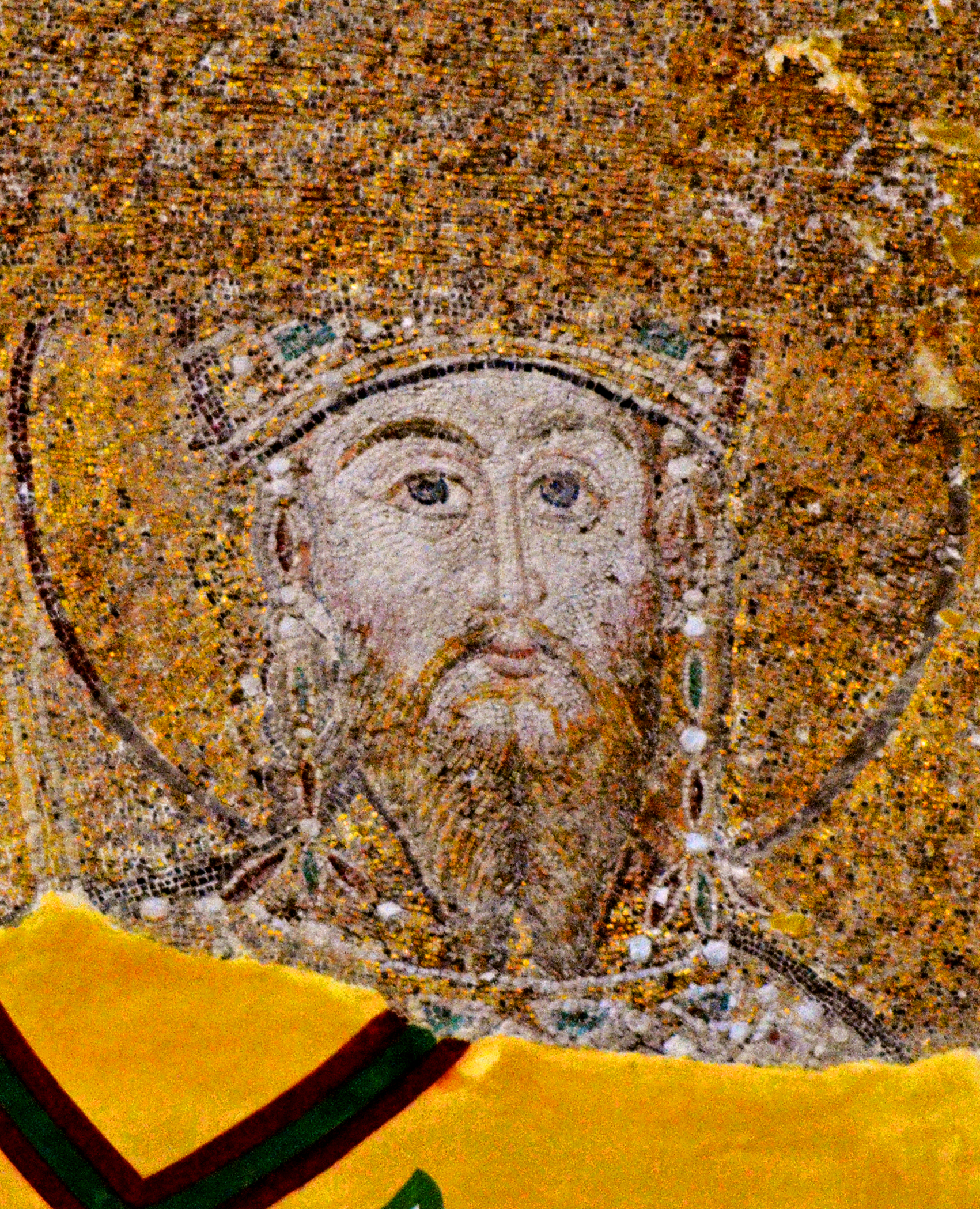
- Restored mosaic of John V Palaiologos in the eastern arch of Hagia Sophia.

Byzantine emperor
- 1st reign: 15 June 1341 – 12 August 1376
- Coronation: 19 November 1341
- Predecessor: Andronikos III Palaiologos
- Successor: Andronikos IV Palaiologos (Note: Later co-emperor from May 1381 to June 1385, in Selymbria and the coast of Marmara.)
- Co-rulers: John VI Kantakouzenos (Note: Rival emperor since 1341, senior co-emperor from February 1347 to December 1354.); Matthew Kantakouzenos (Note: Co-emperor from April 1353 to December 1357, in Thrace, later recognized as despot of the Morea.)
- 2nd reign: 1 July 1379 – 14 April 1390
- Successor: John VII Palaiologos
- 3rd reign: 17 September 1390 – 16 February 1391
- Successor: Manuel II Palaiologos (Note: Co-emperor since September 1373.)
- Born: 18 June 1332; Didymoteicho, Byzantine Empire
- Died: 16 February 1391 (aged 58); Constantinople
- Spouse: Helena Kantakouzene
- Issue: Andronikos IV Palaiologos; Irene Palaiologina; Manuel II Palaiologos; Theodore I Palaiologos; Michael Palaiologos; Maria Palaiologina; Three daughters (names unknown); Zampia Palaiologina (ill.)
Names
- John Komnenos Palaiologos; Ίωάννης Κομνηνός Παλαιολόγος
- House: Palaiologos
- Father: Andronikos III Palaiologos
- Mother: Anna of Savoy
- Religion: Roman Catholicism (From 1369); Eastern Orthodoxy (1332-1369)

John V Palaiologos or Palaeologus (Greek: Ίωάννης Κομνηνός Παλαιολόγος, romanized: Iōánnēs Komnēnós Palaiológos; 18 June 1332 – 16 February 1391) was Byzantine emperor from 1341 to 1391, with interruptions. His long reign was marked by constant civil war, the spread of the Black Death and several military defeats to the Ottoman Turks, who rose as the dominant power of the region.

John V became emperor at age eight, which resulted in a civil war between his regent John VI Kantakouzenos and a rival council led by his mother Anna of Savoy, who pawned the crown jewels to Venice in order to raise funds. Kantakouzenos was recognized as emperor in 1347, coinciding with the arrival of the Black Death. Shortly after, another civil war erupted in 1352, with John V seeking help from Serbia against John VI's son Matthew and his enlisted Ottoman Turks. The Turks used the ensuing chaos to gain their first European territory on former Byzantine soil.

John V assumed real power in 1354, removing John VI and his son Matthew. He attempted to gain Western support for the war against the Turks, resulting in his conversion to Catholicism in 1369 in presence of the Pope. These efforts were useless, as he was imprisoned in Venice due to his debts and was eventually forced to recognize Ottoman suzerainty. Political intriguing continued to plague his late reign; John was twice usurped from the throne, first by his son Andronikos IV in 1376 and then by his grandson John VII in 1390. He died in 1391 and was succeeded by his son Manuel, while his younger son Theodore ruled the Despotate of the Morea.

== Biography ==
John V was the son of Emperor Andronikos III and his wife Anna, the daughter of Count Amadeus V of Savoy by his wife Maria of Brabant. His long reign was marked by the gradual dissolution of imperial power amid numerous civil wars and the continuing ascendancy of the Ottoman Turks.

== Early rule and first civil war ==
John V came to the throne at age eight. His reign began with an immediate civil war between his self-proclaimed regent, his father's friend John VI Kantakouzenos, and a self-proclaimed council of regency composed of his mother Anna, the patriarch John XIV Kalekas, and the megas doux Alexios Apokaukos. During this civil war in 1343 Anna pawned the Byzantine crown jewels for 30,000 Venetian ducats. From 1346 to 1349, the Black Death devastated Constantinople.

== Second civil war ==
Victorious in 1347, John VI Kantakouzenos ruled as co-emperor until his son Matthew Kantakouzenos was attacked by John V in 1352, leading to a second civil war. John V asked the ruler of Serbia, Stefan Dušan for help, and Dušan obliged by sending 4,000 Serbian horsemen to his aid. Matthew Kantakouzenos asked his father for help, and 10,000 Ottoman Turks showed up at Demotika (Didymoteicho) in October 1352 and engaged the forces of John V's Serbian allies in an open field battle that resulted in the destruction of the allies and a victory for the more numerous Turks in the service of the Byzantines. The Ottoman Empire thus acquired its first European territory, at Çimpe and Gallipoli. Able to retake Constantinople in 1354, John V removed and tonsured John VI Kantakouzenos; by 1357, he had deposed Matthew as well, who had been captured by the Serbs and was ransomed to John V.

== Rule and defeats ==
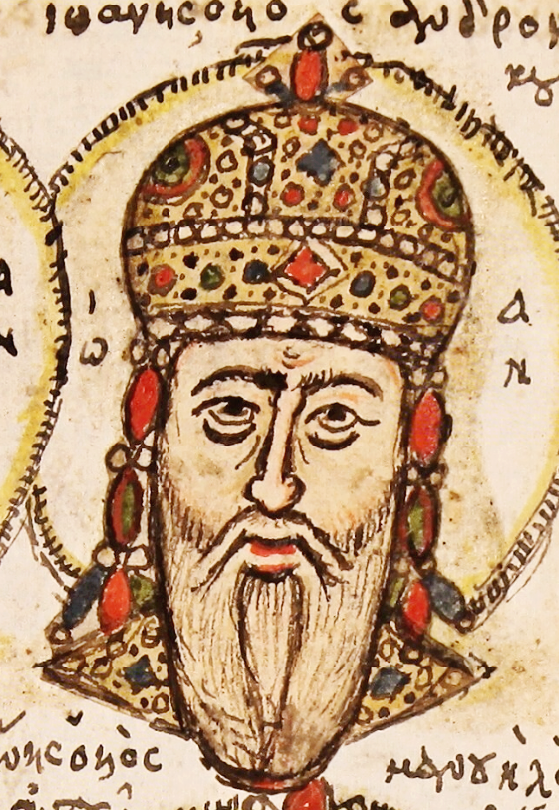
Depiction of John V Palaiologos in the 15th-century Mutinensis gr. 122.

In 1366, John V reached the Kingdom of Hungary, arriving at the Royal city of Buda to meet King Louis I of Hungary. However, the Byzantine emperor offended the king by staying on his horse, while Louis descended and approached him on foot. The Hungarian monarch then offered him help on the condition that John join the Catholic Church, or at least achieve recognition by the Patriarch of the Pope's supremacy. The Emperor left the court of Buda with empty hands and continued his trip through Europe searching for assistance against the Ottomans.

The Ottomans, who had been allied with the Kantakouzenoi, continued to press John. Suleyman Paşa, the son of the Ottoman sultan, led their forces in Europe and was able to take Adrianople and Philippopolis and to exact tribute from the emperor. John V appealed to the West for help, proposing to Pope Urban V in 1367 to end the schism between the Byzantine and Latin churches by submitting the patriarchate to the supremacy of the Pope. In October 1369, John, having travelled through Naples to Rome, formally converted to Catholicism in Saint Peter's Basilica and recognized the Pope as supreme head of the Church. He was not accompanied by the clergy of the Byzantine Church and the move failed to bring about an end to the Schism. He became the last Byzantine emperor (the first since emperor Constans II' visit in 663) to make a visit to Rome.

Impoverished by war, he was detained as a debtor when he visited Venice in 1369 on his way back from Rome and was later captured on his way back through Bulgarian territories. In 1371, he recognized the suzerainty of the Ottoman sultan Murad I. Murad later assisted him against his son Andronikos when the latter deposed him in 1376.

== Deposition and second rule ==
In 1390, his grandson John VII briefly usurped the throne, but was quickly overthrown. The same year, John V ordered the strengthening of the Golden Gate in Constantinople, utilizing marble from the decayed churches in and around the city. Upon completion of this construction, Bayezid I demanded that John raze these new works, threatening war and the blinding of his son Manuel, whom he held in captivity. John V carried out the Sultan's order but is said to have suffered from this humiliation and died soon thereafter on 16 February 1391, and was buried in the Hodegon Monastery in Constantinople.

John V was finally succeeded to the imperial throne by his son Manuel. His younger son Theodore had already acceded to the Despotate of Morea in 1383.

== Family ==
John V married Helena Kantakouzene, daughter of his co-emperor John VI Kantakouzenos and Irene Asanina, on 28 May 1347. They had at least ten children – five sons and at least five daughters. Their known children include:

- Andronikos IV Palaiologos (2 April 1348 – 28 June 1385);
- Irene Palaiologina (c. 1349 – after 1372), who married her first cousin Halil Bey, son of Orhan I and Helena's sister Theodora Kantakouzene.
- Manuel II Palaiologos (27 June 1350 – 21 July 1425);
- Theodore I Palaiologos, Lord of Morea (c. 1355 – 24 June 1407). In 1404 his daughter married Süleyman Çelebi, son of Bayezid I;
- Michael Palaiologos (d. 1376/1377), who claimed the throne of the Empire of Trebizond from Alexios III;
- Maria Palaiologina, married Murad I, son of Orhan;
- A daughter (name unknown) reported to have entered a monastery in 1373;
- A daughter (name unknown) who married Bayezid I, son of Murad I;
- A daughter (name unknown) who married Yakub Çelebi, son of Murad I.

John V also had an illegitimate daughter, Zampia Palaiologina, who married the official Hilario Doria.

== See also ==
- List of Byzantine emperors

== Sources ==
- Harris, Jonathan, The End of Byzantium. New Haven and London: Yale University Press, 2010. ISBN 978-0-300-11786-8
- Alexander Vasiliev, History of the Byzantine Empire 324–1453. Madison: University of Wisconsin Press, 1952. ISBN 0299809269
- Nicol, Donald M. (1996a). The Byzantine Lady: Ten Portraits, 1250–1500. Cambridge University Press.
- Nicol, Donald M. (1993) [1972]. The Last Centuries of Byzantium, 1261–1453. Cambridge: Cambridge University Press. ISBN 9780521439916.
- Nicol, Donald M. (1996b). The Reluctant Emperor: A Biography of John Cantacuzene, Byzantine Emperor and Monk, c. 1295-1383. Cambridge: Cambridge University Press. ISBN 9780521522014.
- Radić, Radivoj (1993). Vreme Jovana V Paleologa (1332–1391) [The Time of John V Palaiologos (1332–1391)] (in Serbian and English). Belgrade: Institute for Byzantine Studies SANU. ISSN 0584-9888.

John V Palaiologos Palaiologos dynasty Born: 1332 Died: 16 February 1391
Regnal titles
Preceded by Andronikos III Palaiologos	Byzantine emperor 1341–1376 with John VI Kantakouzenos (1347–1354); Matthew Kantakouzenos (1353–1357); Andronikos IV Palaiologos (1352–1373); Manuel II Palaiologos (1373–1376)	Succeeded by Andronikos IV Palaiologos
Preceded by Andronikos IV Palaiologos	Byzantine emperor 1379–1390 with Manuel II Palaiologos (1379–1390); Andronikos IV Palaiologos (1381–1385)	Succeeded by John VII Palaiologos
Preceded by John VII Palaiologos	Byzantine emperor 1390–1391 with Manuel II Palaiologos (1390–1391)	Succeeded by Manuel II Palaiologos
