= Andronikos IV Palaiologos =

Byzantine emperor from 1376 to 1379

- Emperor and Autocrat of the Romans
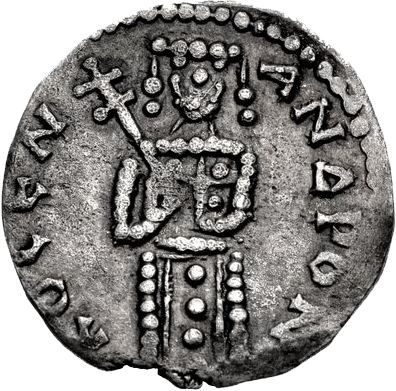

Byzantine emperor
- Reign: 12 August 1376 – 1 July 1379
- Predecessor: John V Palaiologos
- Successor: John V Palaiologos
- Proclamation: 1352 as co-emperor

Byzantine emperor in Selymbria
- Reign: May 1381 – June 1385
- Successor: John VII Palaiologos
- Born: 11 April 1348; Constantinople, Byzantine Empire (now Istanbul, Turkey)
- Died: 25 or 28 June 1385 (aged 37); Selymbria, Byzantine Empire (now Silivri, Istanbul, Turkey)
- Burial: Pantokrator Monastery
- Spouse: Keratsa of Bulgaria
- Issue: John VII Palaiologos
Names
- Andronikos Komnenos Palaiologos; Ἀνδρόνικος Κομνηνός Παλαιολόγος
- House: Palaiologos
- Father: John V Palaiologos
- Mother: Helena Kantakouzene

Andronikos IV Palaiologos or Andronicus IV Palaeologus (Greek: Ἀνδρόνικος Κομνηνὸς Παλαιολόγος, romanized: Andrónikos Komnēnós Palaiológos; 11 April 1348 – 25/28 June 1385) was the eldest son of Byzantine Emperor John V Palaiologos. Appointed co-emperor from 1352, he had a troubled relationship with his father: he launched a failed rebellion in 1373, usurped the throne in 1376–1379, and remained engaged in a bitter struggle with his father, John V, until his death in 1385. This civil war depleted Byzantium's scarce resources and greatly facilitated the Ottoman conquest of the Balkans, most notably through the cession of Gallipoli by Andronikos. He was also the father of John VII.

== Life ==
Born on 11 April 1348, Andronikos IV Palaiologos was the eldest son of Emperor John V Palaiologos by his wife Helena Kantakouzene. In 1352 he was already associated as co-emperor with his father, and when John V left for Italy in 1369 to affirm his submission to the Pope, John left Andronikos behind in Constantinople as regent, while his younger son Manuel II Palaiologos was sent to govern Thessalonica.

During his stay in Italy, John attempted to settle his accounts with the Republic of Venice; this included not only John's own loans, but also the loan of 30,000 ducats (and the associated interest) that his mother, Anna, had taken during the Byzantine civil war of 1341–1347, with the Byzantine crown jewels as collateral. John went in person to Venice, but he lacked the funds to pay off the loans, or even to secure a ship for his voyage home. As a result, he proposed to cede to the Venetians the island of Tenedos, strategically located at the entrance of the Dardanelles, in exchange for further funds and six warships. The Venetians accepted, but when news reached Constantinople, Andronikos IV, likely urged by the Genoese, Venice's commercial rivals, refused to honour his father's agreement. This left John stranded in Venice, effectively as a captive debtor of the Republic; when he suggested that funds be raised to secure his release by selling precious objects from the churches, Andronikos again refused, claiming that this was impious. In the end, it was only the intervention of Manuel, who went from Thessalonica to Venice in person, that secured John's release. It was not until October 1371 that the emperor returned to Constantinople.

Andronikos IV rebelled when the Ottoman sultan Murad I forced John V into vassalage in 1373. On 6 May, Andronikos IV fled Constantinople and allied with Murad's son Savcı Bey, who was rebelling against his own father. Both rebellions failed and Andronikos was imprisoned and blinded on 30 May, albeit only in one eye. His brother Manuel replaced him as heir.

=== Reign ===
In July 1376, the Genoese helped Andronikos to escape from prison, whence he went straight to Sultan Murad I, and agreed to return Gallipoli in exchange for his support. Gallipoli had been retaken by the Byzantines ten years before, with the assistance of Amadeus VI, Count of Savoy; this strategically important bridgehead greatly improved the sultan's ability to attack Europe. The sultan duly provided a mixed force of cavalry and infantry and with these, Andronikos was able to take control of Constantinople. Here he was able to capture and imprison both John V and his son Manuel.

However, he made the mistake of favouring the Genoese too highly by awarding them Tenedos. The governor there refused to hand it over, and passed it on to Venice. In the same year, on 18 October 1377, he was crowned emperor and also crowned his young son John VII as co-emperor. However, in 1379 John and Manuel escaped to Sultan Murad, and with the assistance of the Venetians, overthrew Andronikos later in the year. The Venetians restored John V to the throne, and Manuel II. Andronikos fled to Galata, staying there until May 1381, when he was once again made co-emperor and heir to the throne despite his earlier treachery. Andronikos IV was also given the approaches to Constantinople with the city of Selymbria (Silivri) as his personal domain.

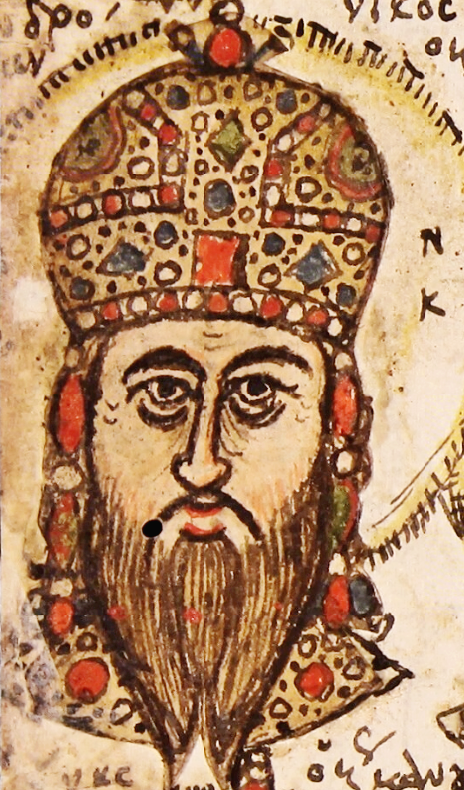
Portrait of Andronikos IV

In 1385, he rebelled again, but died soon after, on 25 or 28 June, at Selymbria. He was buried in the Pantokrator Monastery in Constantinople.

== Family ==
In 1356, Andronikos IV married Keratsa of Bulgaria, a daughter of Emperor Ivan Alexander of Bulgaria. The couple had one son, John VII Palaiologos.

== Sources ==
- Harris, Jonathan, The End of Byzantium. Yale University Press, 2010. ISBN 978-0-300-11786-8
- Kazhdan, Alexander, ed. (1991). The Oxford Dictionary of Byzantium. Oxford and New York: Oxford University Press. ISBN 0-19-504652-8.
- Necipoğlu, Nevra (2009). Byzantium between the Ottomans and the Latins: Politics and Society in the Late Empire. Cambridge: Cambridge University Press. ISBN 978-1-107-40388-8.
- Nicol, Donald M. (1993) [1972]. The Last Centuries of Byzantium, 1261-1453. Cambridge: Cambridge University Press. ISBN 9780521439916.
- Norwich, J.J. (1995). Byzantium: The Decline and Fall. London: Viking. ISBN 978-0-670-82377-2.
- Trapp, Erich; Beyer, Hans-Veit; Walther, Rainer; Sturm-Schnabl, Katja; Kislinger, Ewald; Leontiadis, Ioannis; Kaplaneres, Sokrates (1976–1996). Prosopographisches Lexikon der Palaiologenzeit (in German). Vienna: Verlag der Österreichischen Akademie der Wissenschaften. ISBN 3-7001-3003-1.

Andronikos IV Palaiologos Palaiologos dynasty Born: 2 April 1348 Died: 28 June 1385
Regnal titles
Preceded by John V Palaiologos	Byzantine emperor 1376–1379 with John VII Palaiologos (1377–1379)	Succeeded by John V Palaiologos
