= Byzantine civil war of 1341–1347 =

- Part of the Byzantine civil wars, the Byzantine–Serbian wars and the Byzantine–Turkish wars
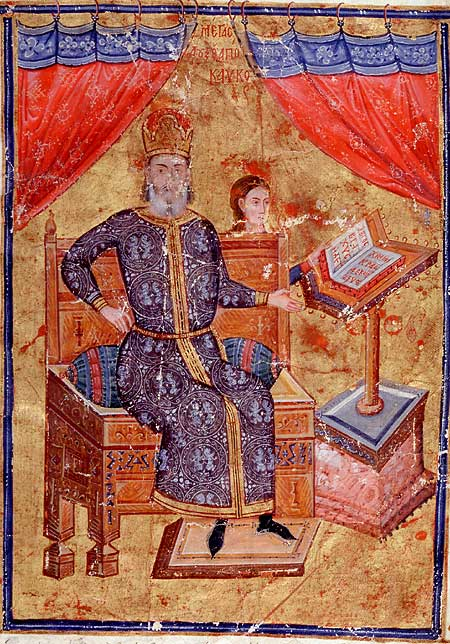
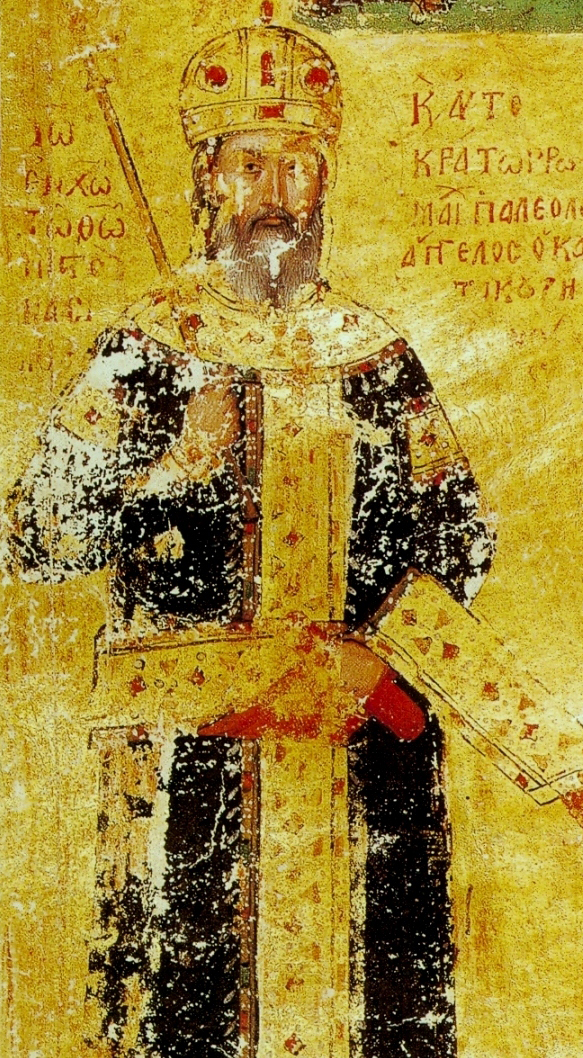
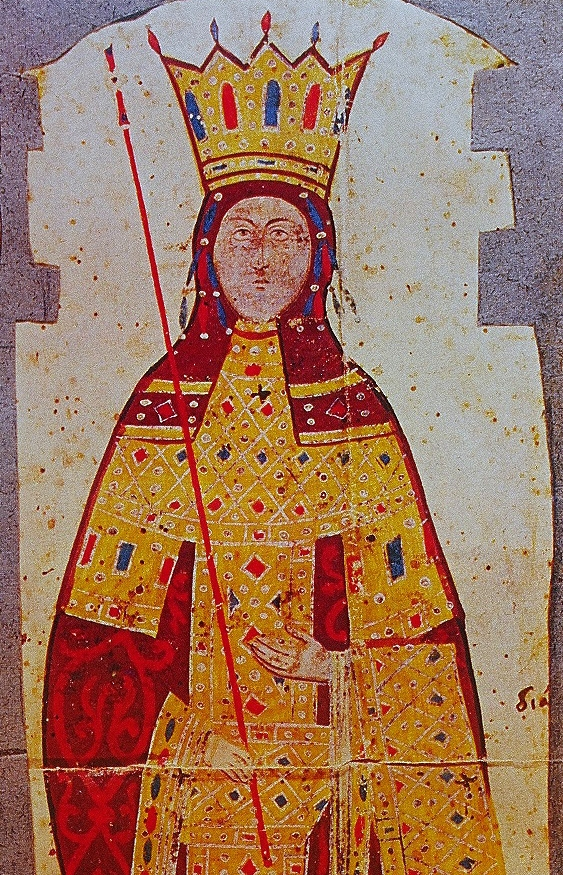
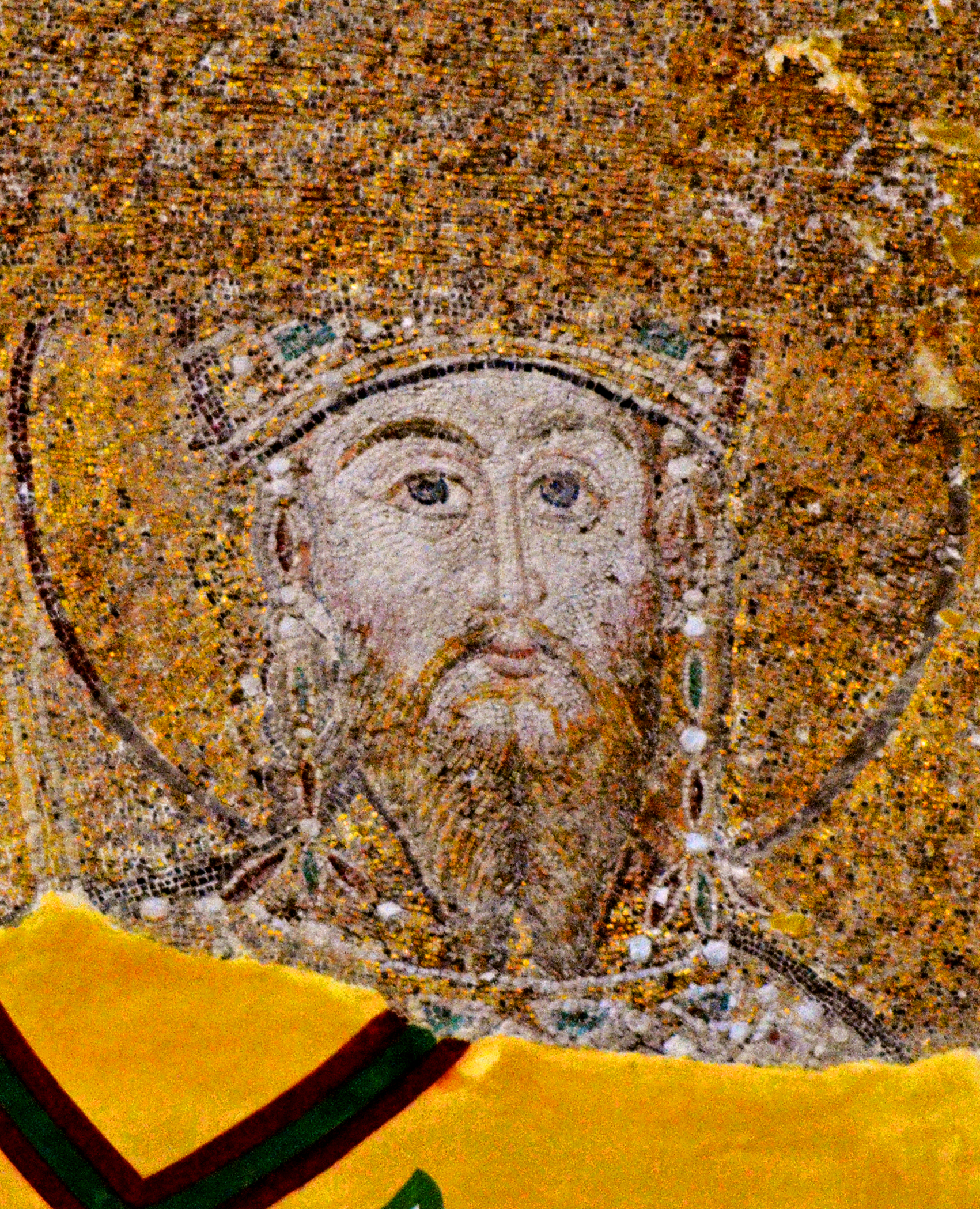
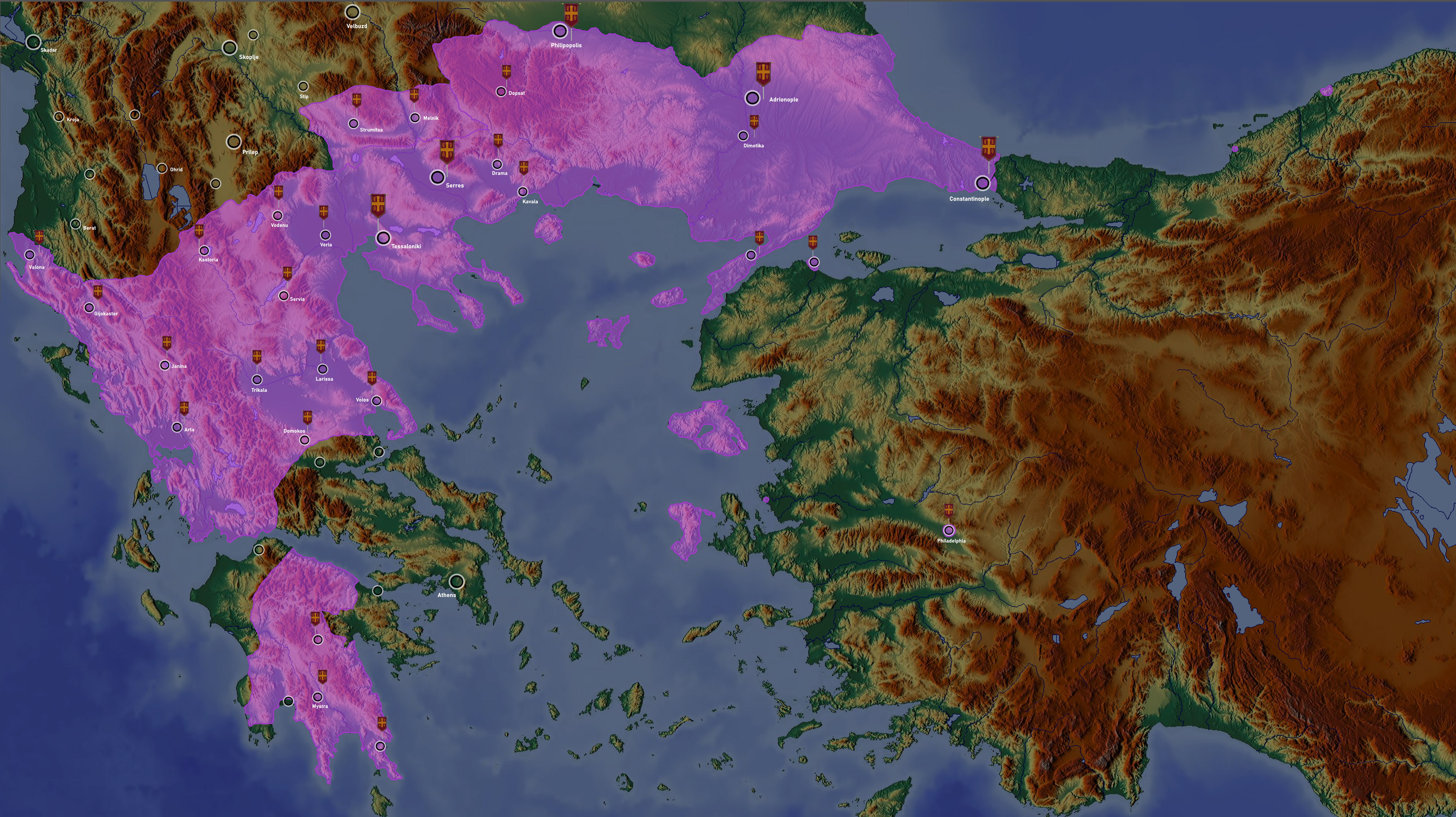
- Alexios Apokaukos, Megas Doux; John VI Kantakouzenos; Anna of Savoy; Mosaic of John V Palaiologos some years after the civil war; Map of the Byzantine Empire at the start of the civil war (1341)
Date	September 1341 – 8 February 1347
Location	Thessaly, Macedonia, Thrace, and Constantinople
Result	Kantakouzenos victory
Territorial changes	Serbia gained Macedonia and Albania, and soon after Epirus and Thessaly, establishing the Serbian Empire. Bulgaria gains northern Thrace.

Belligerents
(Byzantine Empire) John V Palaiologos; Regents: (Byzantine Empire) Anna of Savoy (Byzantine Empire) John XIV Kalekas (Byzantine Empire) Alexios Apokaukos; Allies: Zealots of Thessalonica (Serbian Empire) Serbia (1343–1347); Bulgaria; Principality of Karvuna	(Byzantine Empire) John VI Kantakouzenos; Allies: (Serbian Empire) Serbia (1342–1343); Beylik of Aydin (1342/3–1345) (Ottoman Empire) Ottoman beylik (1345–1347); Beylik of Saruhan; Principality of Albania; Principality of Muzaka

Commanders and leaders
(Byzantine Empire) Alexios Apokaukos (executed) (Serbian Empire) Stefan IV Dušan (Serbian Empire) Gregory Preljub; Ivan Alexander; Momchil † (1344–1345)	(Byzantine Empire) John VI Kantakouzenos (Byzantine Empire) Manuel Kantakouzenos (Byzantine Empire) John Angelos (Serbian Empire) Stefan IV Dušan (Serbian Empire) Hrelja X Umur Bey (Ottoman Empire) Orhan; Andrea II Muzaka

The Byzantine civil war of 1341–1347, sometimes referred to as the Second Palaiologan Civil War, was a conflict that broke out in the Byzantine Empire after the death of Andronikos III Palaiologos over the guardianship of his nine-year-old son and heir, John V Palaiologos. It pitted on the one hand Andronikos III's chief minister, John VI Kantakouzenos, and on the other a regency headed by the Empress-Dowager Anna of Savoy, the Patriarch of Constantinople John XIV Kalekas, and the megas doux Alexios Apokaukos. The war polarized Byzantine society along class lines, with the aristocracy backing Kantakouzenos and the lower and middle classes supporting the regency. To a lesser extent, the conflict acquired religious overtones; Byzantium was embroiled in the Hesychast controversy, and adherence to the mystical doctrine of Hesychasm was often equated with support for Kantakouzenos.

As the chief aide and closest friend of Emperor Andronikos III, Kantakouzenos became regent for the underage John V upon Andronikos's death in June 1341. While Kantakouzenos was absent from Constantinople in September the same year, a coup d'état led by Alexios Apokaukos and the Patriarch John XIV secured the support of Empress Anna and established a new regency. In response, Kantakouzenos' army and supporters proclaimed him co-emperor in October, cementing the rift between himself and the new regency. The split immediately escalated into armed conflict.

During the first years of the war, forces of the regency prevailed. In the wake of several anti-aristocratic uprisings, most notably that of the Zealots in Thessalonica, a majority of the cities in Thrace and Macedonia came under regency control. With assistance from Stefan Dušan of Serbia and Umur Beg of Aydin, Kantakouzenos successfully reversed these gains. By 1345, despite Dušan's defection to the opposition and the withdrawal of Umur, Kantakouzenos retained the upper hand through the assistance of Orhan, ruler of the Ottoman beylik. The June 1345 murder of megas doux Apokaukos, the regency's chief administrator, dealt the regency a severe blow. Formally crowned as emperor in Adrianople in 1346, Kantakouzenos entered Constantinople on 3 February 1347. By agreement, he was to rule for ten years as the senior emperor and regent for John V, until the boy came of age and ruled alongside him. Despite this apparent victory, subsequent resumption of the civil war forced John VI Kantakouzenos to abdicate and retire to become a monk in 1354.

The consequences of the prolonged conflict proved disastrous for the Empire, which had regained a measure of stability under Andronikos III. Seven years of warfare, the presence of marauding armies, social turmoil, and the advent of the Black Death devastated Byzantium and reduced it to a rump state. The conflict also allowed Dušan to conquer Albania, Epirus and most of Macedonia, where he established the Serbian Empire. The Bulgarian Empire also acquired territory north of the Evros river.

== Background ==
In 1341, the Byzantine Empire was in a state of turmoil, and despite the restoration of the Empire's capital to Constantinople and the recovery of a measure of its former power by Michael VIII Palaiologos (r. 1259–1282), the policies implemented during his reign had exhausted the state's resources, and the Empire's strength waned under his successor, Andronikos II Palaiologos (r. 1282–1328). During Andronikos' long reign, the remaining Byzantine possessions in Asia Minor slowly fell to the advancing Turks, most notably the newly established Ottoman emirate. This caused a flood of refugees into Byzantium's European provinces, while at the same time, the Catalan Company wrought havoc in the imperial domains. Taxes also rose dramatically to finance tributes to the Empire's enemies. A combination of these failures and personal ambition moved the Emperor's grandson and heir, the young Andronikos III Palaiologos, to revolt. Supported by a group of young aristocrats led by John Kantakouzenos and Syrgiannes Palaiologos, Andronikos III deposed his grandfather after a series of conflicts during the 1320s. Although successful in removing the old Emperor from power, the war did not augur well for the future, as the Empire's neighbours—the Serbs, Bulgarians, Turks, Genoese and Venetians—took advantage of Byzantine infighting to gain territory or expand their influence within the Empire.

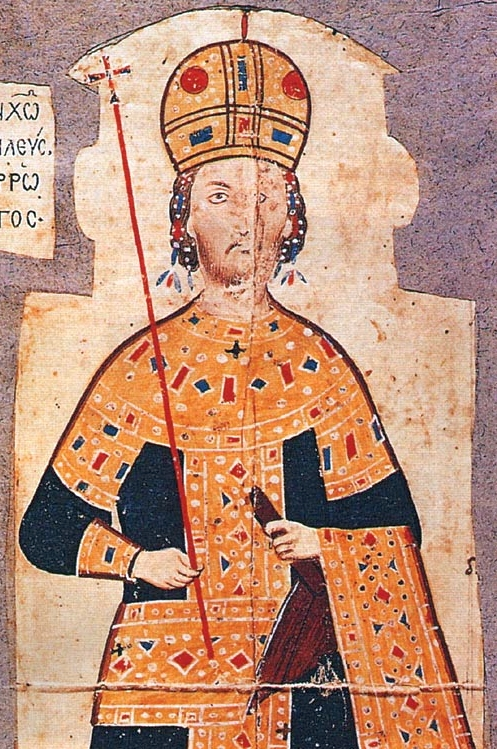
Emperor Andronikos III, who supervised the last period of recovery of the Byzantine state.

The only son of a former governor of the Byzantine holdings in the Morea, John Kantakouzenos was related to the Palaiologoi through his mother. He inherited vast estates in Macedonia, Thrace and Thessaly, and became a childhood friend and the closest and most trusted advisor of Andronikos III. During Andronikos III's reign (1328–1341), John Kantakouzenos acted as his chief minister, holding the office of megas domestikos, commander-in-chief of the Byzantine army. The relationship between the two remained close, and in 1330, when the heirless Andronikos III (John V was born in 1332) fell ill he insisted that Kantakouzenos be proclaimed Emperor or regent after his death. Their ties were further strengthened in the spring of 1341, when the latter's eldest son, Matthew Kantakouzenos, wed Irene Palaiologina, a cousin of the Emperor.

Unlike Andronikos II, who had disbanded the Byzantine army and navy, and who favoured monks and intellectuals, Andronikos III was an energetic ruler who personally led his forces in military campaigns. In 1329, his first campaign against the Ottomans resulted in a disastrous defeat at the Battle of Pelekanos, after which the Byzantine position in Bithynia rapidly collapsed. Subsequent sorties into the Balkans were nevertheless successful in shoring up Andronikos' tottering realm. Thessaly and the Despotate of Epirus, two territories separated from the Empire after the Fourth Crusade, were restored to imperial rule, almost without bloodshed in 1328 and 1337 respectively. Andronikos III also rebuilt a modest fleet, which allowed him to recover the rich and strategically placed island of Chios from the Genoese Zaccaria family in 1329 as well as to claim the allegiance of Andreolo Cattaneo, the Genoese governor of Phocaea on the Anatolian mainland. In 1335, however, Andreolo's son Domenico captured the island of Lesbos with Genoese assistance. The Emperor led a fleet to recover it and Phocaea, and requested the aid of the Turkish emirs of Saruhan and Aydin. Saruhan sent troops and supplies, but Aydin's ruler Umur Beg came to meet the Emperor in person. It was during this encounter that Kantakouzenos and Umur established a long-lasting close friendship and alliance.

A war with Serbia in 1331–1334 proved less successful for the Emperor when several towns in Macedonia were captured by the Serbs, led by the renegade Syrgiannes Palaiologos. These gains were only curtailed when the assassination of Syrgiannes and the threat of a Hungarian invasion forced the Serbian ruler, Stefan Dušan, to seek a negotiated settlement. The subsequent peace treaty concluded between Andronikos III and Dušan was important for the future of Byzantine-Serbian relations. For the first time, the Byzantines recognized the extensive gains the Serbs had made at the Empire's expense in the central Balkans during Andronikos II's reign. In the aftermath of the pact, Dušan also moved his seat, and with it his realm's centre of gravity, south to Prilep.

Although the loss of Asia Minor proved irreversible, successes in Epirus and Thessaly led to a consolidation of the Empire in the Greek-speaking lands of the southern Balkans. Andronikos III and Kantakouzenos planned further campaigns to recover the Latin principalities of southern Greece, a project of major long-term importance, for, as the historian Donald Nicol writes, "if the whole peninsula of Greece could be united under Byzantine government then the Empire would once again be a homogeneous structure, able to stand up to the Serbians, the Italians and its other enemies. It would be small, but it would be a compact and manageable economic and administrative unit running from Cape Matapan to Thessalonica and Constantinople".

== Kantakouzenos' regency: June–September 1341 ==
Following a short illness, on the night of 14–15 June 1341 the emperor Andronikos III died at the relatively early age of 44, possibly due to chronic malaria. His nine-year-old son John (John V) was the obvious successor, but he had not been officially proclaimed or crowned as co-emperor. This left a legal vacuum, and raised the question of who would lead the Empire's government.

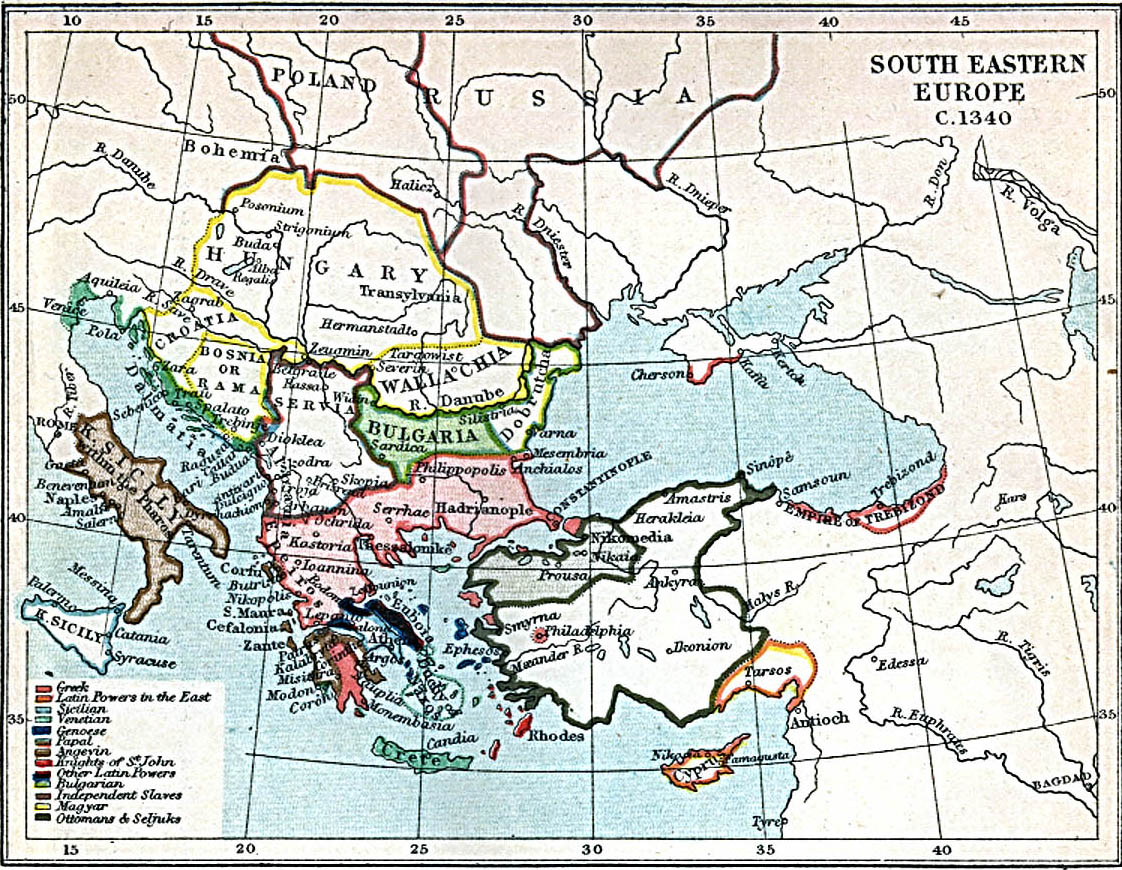
The Byzantine Empire and its neighbouring states in 1340.

According to Byzantine custom, the empress-dowager automatically headed any regency. Nevertheless, despite the lack of any formal appointment, Kantakouzenos placed Andronikos III's sons and the Empress-dowager Anna of Savoy under armed guard in the palace, and in a meeting of the Byzantine Senate claimed for himself the regency and governance of the state by virtue of his close association with the deceased Emperor. He also demanded that John V marry forthwith his own daughter Helena Kantakouzene. This claim was disputed by Patriarch John XIV of Constantinople, who presented a document from Andronikos dating from 1334, assigning to him the care of the imperial family in the case of his death. Only after a demonstration of the capital's troops on 20 June did Kantakouzenos secure recognition as regent and control of the reins of government, as well as maintaining control over the army as its megas domestikos.

Nevertheless, opposition to Kantakouzenos began to coalesce around three figures: the Patriarch, a forceful man determined to have a voice in the governance of the Empire, the Empress-regent, who feared that Kantakouzenos would dispossess her son, and last but not least Alexios Apokaukos, the ambitious megas doux (commander-in-chief of the navy) and head of the bureaucracy. A 'new man' promoted to high office as the protégé of Andronikos III and possibly the richest man in the Empire by 1341, Apokaukos was distrusted by the hereditary aristocracy. The only surviving narrative accounts of the period, Kantakouzenos's memoirs and the history of Nikephoros Gregoras, with their pro-aristocracy bias, paint a very negative picture of the man. According to Kantakouzenos, Apokaukos' adherence to the Patriarch's camp resulted from his ambition: Apokaukos sought further advancement by trying to convince Kantakouzenos to declare himself Emperor. When the latter refused, Apokaukos secretly switched his allegiance.

In Donald Nicol's opinion, had Kantakouzenos remained at Constantinople, his authority might have remained secure. As the megas domestikos and regent however, he had the duty of dealing with the Empire's various enemies, who sought to take advantage of Andronikos' death. Dušan had invaded Macedonia, the Emir of Saruhan raided the coasts of Thrace, and Tsar Ivan Alexander of Bulgaria threatened war. In July Kantakouzenos left the capital at the head of the army, leaving control of the government to Apokaukos, whom he still believed loyal to him. Kantakouzenos' campaign proved successful. He persuaded Dušan to withdraw and repulsed the Turkish raiders, while Ivan Alexander, threatened by a fleet from the Emirate of Aydin, renewed his peace treaty with Byzantium. To crown this success, Kantakouzenos received an embassy of the Latin barons of the Principality of Achaea in the Morea. They expressed readiness to surrender the country in exchange for a guarantee of their property and rights. It was a unique opportunity, as Kantakouzenos himself recognized in his memoirs, since if successful, the Catalan-controlled Duchy of Athens was bound to follow, consolidating Byzantine control over Greece.

At this point Kantakouzenos received grave news from Constantinople. In late August Apokaukos attempted a coup and tried to kidnap John V. Having failed, he fled to his fortified house at Epibatai, where he was blockaded by troops. Kantakouzenos returned to Constantinople in early September, where he stayed for a few weeks consulting with the Empress. On his way back to Thrace to prepare for a campaign into the Morea, he went to Epibatai, where he pardoned Apokaukos and restored him to his former offices.

== Outbreak of the war: Autumn 1341 ==
Kantakouzenos' second departure proved a great error. Back in the capital, his enemies moved in his absence. Apokaukos gathered a group of high-ranking aristocrats around him, including men such as the megas droungarios John Gabalas or George Choumnos, whom he tied to himself by marriage alliances. The Patriarch, backed by Apokaukos' group and the authority of the Empress, dismissed Kantakouzenos from his offices and declared him a public enemy. Kalekas himself was proclaimed regent and Apokaukos named Eparch of Constantinople. Kantakouzenos' relatives and supporters were imprisoned or forced to flee the city, and their properties confiscated. Although Kantakouzenos' wife and children were safe in his headquarters at Demotika (Didymoteicho), the regency placed his mother, Theodora, under house arrest. The privations she suffered during her imprisonment were to cause her eventual death.

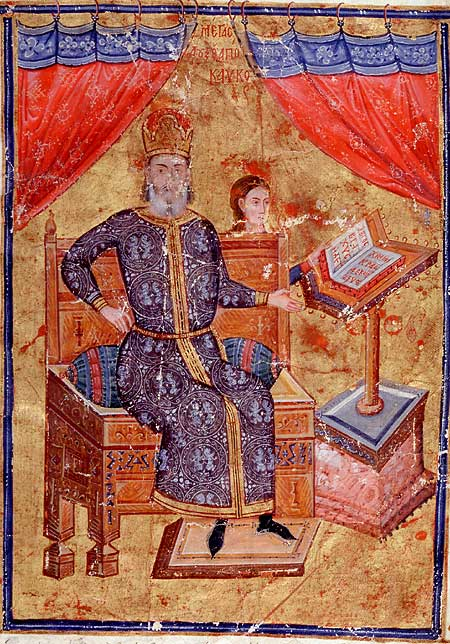
Donor portrait of the megas doux Alexios Apokaukos, one of the leaders of the anti-Kantakouzenos regency.

As the first groups of his partisans fleeing the capital arrived at Demotika, Kantakouzenos, by his own account, tried to negotiate with the new regency, but his approach was rebuffed. Finally forced to take decisive action, on 26 October 1341, the army (2,000 cavalry and 4,000 infantry, according to Gregoras) and his supporters, largely drawn from the land-holding aristocracy, proclaimed Kantakouzenos Emperor. Although he still presented himself officially as a junior colleague to John V, and claimed to be only acting in the boy's name, having staked his claim on the throne, he had effectively started a civil war. Kantakouzenos still hoped that negotiation might resolve the situation, but all his envoys were imprisoned and he and his supporters excommunicated by Patriarch John XIV. On 19 November 1341, the regency responded to Kantakouzenos' proclamation as Emperor with the formal coronation of John V.

Reaction to Kantakouzenos' proclamation caused a rift in Byzantine society, with the rich and powerful land-holding magnates (traditionally called the dynatoi, the 'powerful ones') who dominated the countryside quickly rallying to support him, while the ordinary population, often living in abject conditions and suffering under oppressive taxation, supported the Empress-dowager and the Patriarch. Apokaukos was especially quick to capitalize upon this division and foment popular dislike for the aristocracy, by widely publicizing the immense wealth confiscated from Kantakouzenos' and his supporters' houses and estates. In the words of Donald Nicol, "it was against him [Kantakouzenos] and everything that he stood for as a millionaire and landowning aristocrat that the people rose up. 'Kantakouzenism' became their war cry, the slogan of their discontent".

Thus the battle lines of the civil war were drawn up between urban and rural factions. The cities, dominated by the middle-class civil bureaucracy and merchant class (the "people of the market"), favoured a more mercantile economy and close relations with the Italian maritime republics, while the countryside remained under the control of the conservative landed aristocracy, which derived its wealth from its estates and traditionally shunned commercial and entrepreneurial activities as unworthy of its status. The lower social strata tended to support the respective dominant faction, the middle classes in the cities and the landholding magnates in the countryside.

Polarization of this nature was not new in the Byzantine Empire. Evidence of competition between the landed aristocracy and the city-based middle classes in the political, economic and social spheres has been attested since the 11th century, but the scale of the conflict that erupted in 1341 was unprecedented. This class conflict was mirrored in the breakaway Byzantine Empire of Trebizond as well, where a pro-imperial and pro-Constantinopolitan urban faction confronted the provincial landholding aristocracy between 1340 and 1349. The more conservative and anti-Western tendencies of the aristocrats, and their links to the staunchly Orthodox and anti-Catholic monasteries, also explain their increased attachment to the mystical Hesychasm movement advocated by Gregory Palamas, whose views were mostly opposed in the cities. Although several significant exceptions leave the issue open to question among modern scholars, in the contemporary popular mind (and in traditional historiography), the supporters of 'Palamism' and of 'Kantakouzenism' were usually equated. Kantakouzenos' eventual victory also meant the victory of Hesychasm, confirmed in a synod in Constantinople in 1351. Hesychasm eventually became a hallmark of the Orthodox church tradition, although it was rejected by the Catholics as a heresy.

The first manifestation of this social division appeared in Adrianople where, on 27 October, the populace expelled the city's aristocrats, securing it for the regency. This event was repeated over the next weeks in town after town throughout Thrace and Macedonia, as the people declared their support for the regency and against the despised forces of 'Kantakouzenism'. In this hostile atmosphere, many of Kantakouzenos' soldiers abandoned him and returned to Constantinople. In Demotika alone the popular uprising was quelled, and the town remained Kantakouzenos' main stronghold in Thrace throughout the war.

== Kantakouzenos seeks Dušan's aid: 1342 ==
When heavy snowfall rendered campaigning impossible during the following winter, Kantakouzenos instead sent envoys, including an embassy of monks from Mount Athos to Constantinople. However, they too were dismissed by the Patriarch. By then, almost all of the Byzantine provinces and their governors had declared themselves for the regency. Only Theodore Synadenos, an old associate of Kantakouzenos who was the governor of the Empire's second city, Thessalonica, indicated his support. Synadenos had kept his allegiance to Kantakouzenos secret from the city's populace, and intended to surrender Thessalonica in collusion with the local aristocracy. Furthermore, Hrelja, the Serbian magnate and virtually independent ruler of Strumica and the Strymon River valley, seemed to lean towards Kantakouzenos. Consequently, as soon as the weather improved, on 2 March 1342, Kantakouzenos left his wife Irene Asanina, his brother-in-law Manuel Asen and his daughters to hold Demotika and marched west with his army toward Thessalonica. On the way, he first attacked Peritheorion but was repelled and continued westward. Kantakouzenos was however able to take fortress Melnik, where he met with Hrelja to forge an alliance. Their two armies marched toward Thessalonica, but arrived too late to take control. As they approached the city, they were met by Synadenos and other aristocrats, who had fled after an uprising led by a radical popular party, the Zealots. Soon afterwards a fleet of 70 ships led by Apokaukos reinforced the city. Synadenos, whose family had remained behind in Thessalonica, defected to the regency. Apokaukos' son John was appointed governor of Thessalonica, although effective power rested with the Zealots, who for the next seven years led an autonomous regime unparalleled in Byzantine history.

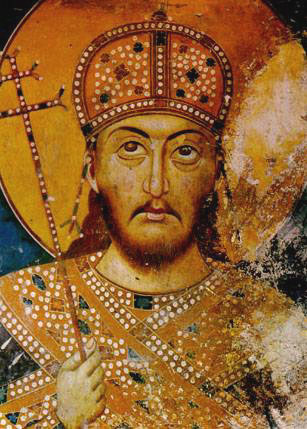
The Serbian Tsar Stefan Dušan, who exploited the Byzantine civil war to greatly expand his realm. His reign marks the apogee of the medieval Serbian state.

At the same time, the regency's army campaigned in Thrace, formally taking possession of towns secured by popular revolt. With Thessalonica barred against him, his supply lines to Thrace cut, and desertions having reduced his army to 2,000 men, of whom half belonged to Hrelja, Kantakouzenos was forced to withdraw north to Serbia, where he hoped to secure the aid of Stefan Dušan. Soon after, Hrelja also deserted Kantakouzenos and joined the regency, hoping to gain control of Melnik for himself. In July 1342, Kantakouzenos met Dušan near Pristina. The Serbian ruler appeared initially reluctant to form an alliance. Nevertheless, under pressure from his nobles, especially the powerful Jovan Oliver, he could not afford to miss this unique opportunity to expand south. Desperately in need of Serbian aid, Kantakouzenos apparently agreed that the Serbs could keep any town they took, despite his own later account to the contrary. According to Nikephoros Gregoras, the Serbs claimed all of Macedonia west of Christopolis (Kavala), except for Thessalonica and its environs. The only concession Kantakouzenos secured was that an exception be made for those towns that surrendered to him in person. To seal the pact, Kantakouzenos' younger son, Manuel, was to be wed to the daughter of Jovan Oliver, although after Dušan later broke the alliance, the marriage did not take place. Hrelja too acceded to the pact, in exchange for the surrender of Melnik by Kantakouzenos' garrison. After Hrelja's death later that year, Melnik was seized by Dušan.

In late summer 1342, Kantakouzenos, accompanied by several Serbian magnates, marched into Macedonia at the head of a Greek and Serbian force, intending to break through to his wife, who still held out at Demotika. His advance was stopped almost immediately before Serres when the city refused to surrender, and the subsequent siege had to be abandoned after an epidemic killed most of his men, forcing him to retreat into Serbia with a rump force of barely 500 soldiers. Dušan led a more successful parallel campaign, capturing Vodena (Edessa). Serbian forces captured Florina and Kastoria shortly afterwards, thereby extending their hold over western Macedonia. The Serbs also expanded their control over Albania, so that by the summer of 1343, with the exception of Angevin-controlled Dyrrhachium, all of the region appears to have fallen under Serbian rule. Morale among Kantakouzenos' followers fell dramatically. Rumours circulated in Constantinople that a dejected Kantakouzenos planned to retire to Mount Athos as a monk, and riots broke out in the city in which several rich men were killed and their houses looted by the populace.

In late fall, Empress Anna twice sent embassies to Dušan trying to convince him to surrender Kantakouzenos, but the Serbian ruler, seeking to extract more profit from their alliance, refused. Kantakouzenos' fortunes began to improve when a delegation of the nobles of Thessaly reached him and offered to accept his authority. Kantakouzenos appointed his relative John Angelos as the province's governor. Although in effect a semi-independent ruler, Angelos was both loyal and effective. He soon brought Epirus — which he had governed in Andronikos III's name in 1340 — into the Kantakouzenist camp, and even made gains in Thessaly at the expense of the Catalans of Athens. Another effort by Kantakouzenos to break from Serbia into Macedonia failed before Serres. In the meantime, Kantakouzenos' wife Irene called upon the aid of the Bulgarians to help relieve the blockade of Demotika by the regency's army. Ivan Alexander dispatched troops, but although they clashed with the regency's forces, they made no effort in assisting the city, instead pillaging the countryside.

== Kantakouzenos resurgent: 1343–1345 ==
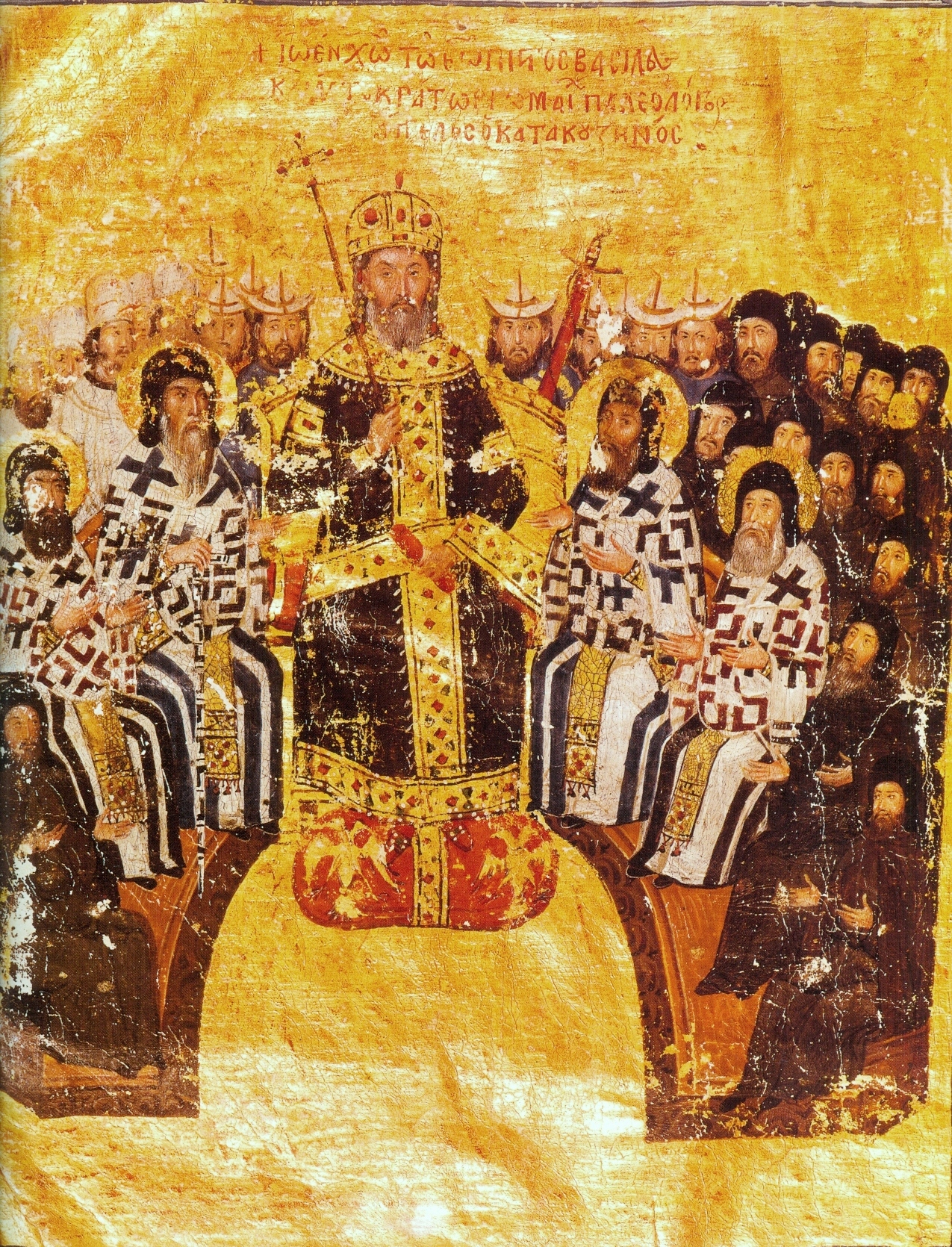
John Kantakouzenos as Emperor, presiding over a synod

At this point, Kantakouzenos' position was greatly strengthened by the intervention of his old friend, Umur Bey, who in late 1342 or early 1343 sailed up the Evros river with a fleet of 300 ships and 29,000 (according to Kantakouzenos) or 15,000 (according to Turkish sources) men-in-arms and relieved Demotika both from the siege by the regency's forces and from the depredations of the Bulgarians. After pillaging Thrace for a few months, Umur was forced to retreat to Asia at the onset of winter, to which the Turks were unaccustomed. This turn of events displeased Dušan, for Kantakouzenos now had an independent power base and was less reliant on the Serbian ruler's goodwill. The final rift between Kantakouzenos and Dušan occurred in April 1343, when Kantakouzenos persuaded the town of Berroia, besieged by the Serbs, to surrender to him instead of Dušan. This was followed by the surrender of several other forts in the area to Kantakouzenos, including Servia and Platamon. These moves strengthened Kantakouzenos' position and independence from Dušan, thereby thwarting the latter's plans for expansion. Realizing that he had little to gain by continuing to support Kantakouzenos, Dušan opened negotiations with the regency and concluded a formal alliance with them in the summer of 1343.

Meanwhile, Kantakouzenos and his army camped outside Thessalonica, hoping to take the city through the aid of his supporters within the walls. Apokaukos arrived at the head of the Byzantine fleet to aid the Zealots, pinning Kantakouzenos down in Macedonia between Thessalonica and Dušan's possessions. Once again Umur of Aydin came to Kantakouzenos' assistance with a fleet carrying some 6,000 men, whereupon Apokaukos and his ships fled from the superior Turkish navy. Nevertheless, a reinforced Thessalonica was able to hold out against a siege by Kantakouzenos and Umur. Although he had failed to take Thessalonica, the presence of his Turkish allies allowed Kantakouzenos to turn his attention towards Thrace. In late 1343 he left his son Manuel as governor of Berroia and western Macedonia and marched towards Demotika, relieving the city and seeing his wife for the first time in almost two years. On his way to Demotika, Kantakouzenos had seized a number of fortresses in Thrace, although another siege of Peritheorion failed. He followed up with a successful campaign that took Komotini and other fortresses in the Rhodope area. Over the next couple of years, the towns and forts of Thrace came over to Kantakouzenos' camp one by one, but at great cost, as his mainly Turkish troops repeatedly plundered the countryside. The shifting tide of the war did not go unnoticed in the opposing camp. In late 1344, several prominent personalities defected to Kantakouzenos, including John Vatatzes, a general and relative by marriage to both the Patriarch and Apokaukos, the Patriarch of Jerusalem Lazaros, and, most importantly, Manuel Apokaukos, son of the megas doux and governor of Adrianople.

"The king [Dušan] was insatiable, revelling in the civil wars of the Romans and considering this time the most advantageous to him and the greatest gift of fortune. Wherefore he descended like a flame and was spreading over the Roman cities and land, continuously enslaving them on his way, since there was nothing that could resist his assaults."

— Nikephoros Gregoras, Roman History, II.746.

At the same time, the regency's alliance with Dušan was paying dividends for the Serbian ruler alone, as he had free rein to plunder and occupy all of Macedonia and Epirus. By the end of 1345, only Thessalonica, held by the Zealots, Serres and the surrounding region, which remained loyal to the regency, along with Berroia, which still held out under Manuel Kantakouzenos, remained outside Serbian control.

These developments placed the regency in considerable difficulties. In spite of Apokaukos' adroit management of the state's finances, the devastation caused by the prolonged wars had emptied the treasury. In August 1343, Empress Anna was forced to pawn the crown jewels to Venice for 30,000 ducats. In addition, Turkish ravages in Thrace led to a scarcity of food in Constantinople. Hoping for Western aid, Anna appealed to the Pope, promising the submission of herself, John V, Apokaukos and even the Patriarch to his authority, and began persecuting the pro-Kantakouzenists and anti-Western Palamists.

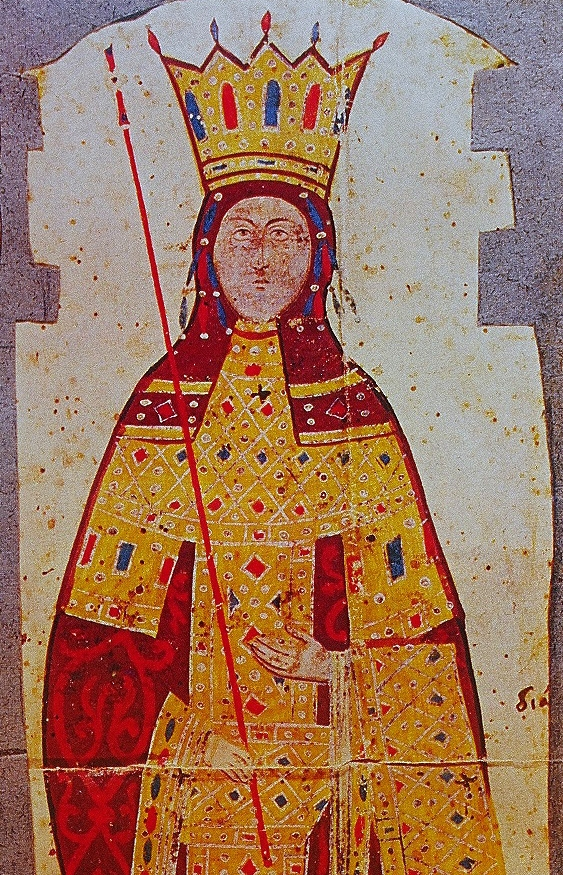
Andronikos III's empress-dowager, Anna of Savoy

In 1344, the regency concluded a further alliance with Bulgaria, which required the surrender of Philippopolis (Plovdiv) and nine other towns in northern Thrace along the river Evros. Nevertheless, after their occupation, Ivan Alexander refrained from direct action against Kantakouzenos' forces operating in southern and eastern Thrace. At the same time, Momchil, a former brigand whom Kantakouzenos had entrusted with control over the region of Merope in the Rhodope mountains, switched over to the regency. In early 1344, Kantakouzenos was deprived of Umur and the bulk of his army, who had sailed home to repel a Latin attack on his main harbour, Smyrna. On their way, the Turkish force was attacked by the Serbs under Gregory Preljub, but prevailed at the Battle of Stephaniana. Nevertheless, Kantakouzenos was able to ward off joint attacks by Dušan and Apokaukos until Umur returned to his aid the next spring at the head of an army of 20,000 men.

Kantakouzenos and Umur raided Bulgaria, and then turned against Momchil. The latter had exploited the power vacuum in the Rhodope, an effective no man's land between the Serbs, Bulgarians and Byzantines, to set himself up as a quasi-independent prince, supported by a substantial force of around 5,000 men. On 7 July 1345, the two armies clashed at Peritheorion. Momchil's army was crushed, and he himself fell in the field. Soon afterwards, Dušan arrived before Serres and laid siege to the city. Rejecting demands by Kantakouzenos to withdraw, a clash appeared inevitable until the murder of Alexios Apokaukos in Constantinople forced Kantakouzenos to direct his attention there.

== Last years of the war: 1345–1347 ==
In early 1345, Kantakouzenos sent Franciscan friars to the regency to make an offer of conciliation, but it was rejected. Despite this show of confidence, the regency's position remained insecure. The defections of the previous winter had weakened their control of the capital, and in response Apokaukos launched a series of proscriptions. He also ordered the construction of a new prison to house political prisoners. On 11 June 1345, while undertaking an inspection of the prison unaccompanied by his bodyguard, Apokaukos was lynched by the prisoners.

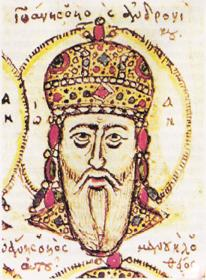
Emperor John V Palaiologos. His reign, from 1341 to 1391, saw the final disintegration of the Byzantine Empire by recurring civil wars. Aside from the conflict over his custodianship, he would fight a war in 1352–1357 to remove the Kantakouzenoi from power, and later in his rule he would be deposed by his son Andronikos IV in 1376–1379 and by his grandson John VII in 1390.

When Kantakouzenos heard the news he marched towards Constantinople, urged by his supporters, who expected that the death of Apokaukos would result in the collapse of the regency. Kantakouzenos was more sceptical, and indeed the Patriarch and Empress Anna quickly brought the situation under control. At the same time, Kantakouzenos suffered a series of reverses. These began when John Apokaukos, the nominal governor of Thessalonica, openly announced his allegiance to Kantakouzenos and his plans to surrender the city. He was immediately thwarted by the Zealots who rose up again and killed Apokaukos and the other Kantakouzenist sympathizers in the city. Then John Vatatzes, who had defected to Kantakouzenos the year before, once more switched sides. He attempted to take some of Kantakouzenos' Turkish allies and a few Thracian cities with him, but was murdered soon afterwards. Finally, Kantakouzenos lost the support of his most crucial ally, Umur of Aydin, who left with his army to confront the crusaders in Smyrna. Kantakouzenos replaced him by allying himself with the Emir of Saruhan and, more importantly, Orhan of the rising Ottoman emirate in Bithynia.

In September 1345, after a long siege, Serres fell to Dušan. The Serbian ruler, who by now controlled about half of the pre-1341 Byzantine realm, was spurred by this success to lay his own claim on the Byzantine throne. Consequently, on Easter Sunday, 16 April 1346, he was crowned "Emperor of the Serbs and the Romans" in Skopje, thereby founding the Serbian Empire. This development prompted Kantakouzenos, who had only been acclaimed Emperor in 1341, to have himself formally crowned in a ceremony held at Adrianople on 21 May, presided over by the Patriarch of Jerusalem, Lazaros. Lazaros then convened a synod of bishops to excommunicate the Patriarch of Constantinople, John Kalekas. Not long afterwards, Kantakouzenos' ties with his new ally Orhan were cemented through the marriage of his daughter Theodora Kantakouzene to the Ottoman emir at an elaborate ceremony in Selymbria.

For the regency, the situation had become desperate. Empress Anna's requests for aid from foreign powers proved unsuccessful, as both Orhan and the beylik of Karasi rebuffed her overtures for assistance. Only Balik, the ruler of Dobruja, sent an elite force of 1,000 men under his brothers Theodore and Dobrotitsa, but they were routed by a Kantakouzenist army under protostrator George Phakrases. The emirate of Saruhan offered a more substantial force of 6,000 men in the summer of 1346, but instead of fighting, they plundered Thrace and then defected to join Kantakouzenos' army. Revenue remained scarce for the regency, the Genoese under Simone Vignoso once again seized the imperial possessions of Chios and Phocaea, and on 19 May 1346, a part of the Hagia Sophia cathedral collapsed, a terrible omen in the eyes of the capital's inhabitants.

By the summer of 1346, Kantakouzenos stood on the verge of victory. He left Thrace under the control of his son Matthew and moved on to Selymbria, close to Constantinople. He did not attack the capital, but waited for almost a year for the city to surrender. In his memoirs, he explains that he did not want to turn his Turks on the city, although contemporaries such as Gregoras accused him of indecision and of needlessly prolonging the war.

As the months passed, and the privations in Constantinople increased, the pro-Kantakouzenos faction in the capital grew as the Empress refused even to consider negotiations. Twice agents were sent to assassinate Kantakouzenos, but they failed. The Empress eventually fell out with Patriarch John Kalekas, who was deposed in a synod on 2 February 1347. On the same night, supporters of Kantakouzenos opened the disused Golden Gate, and Kantakouzenos entered the city with 1,000 men. Meeting no resistance, his troops surrounded the Palace of Blachernae, the imperial residence, the next morning, but the Empress refused to surrender for several days, still fearful of the fate that awaited her. Kantakouzenos' men grew impatient and stormed part of the palace complex, and John V persuaded his mother to accept a settlement.

== Peace settlement and Kantakouzenos' reign ==
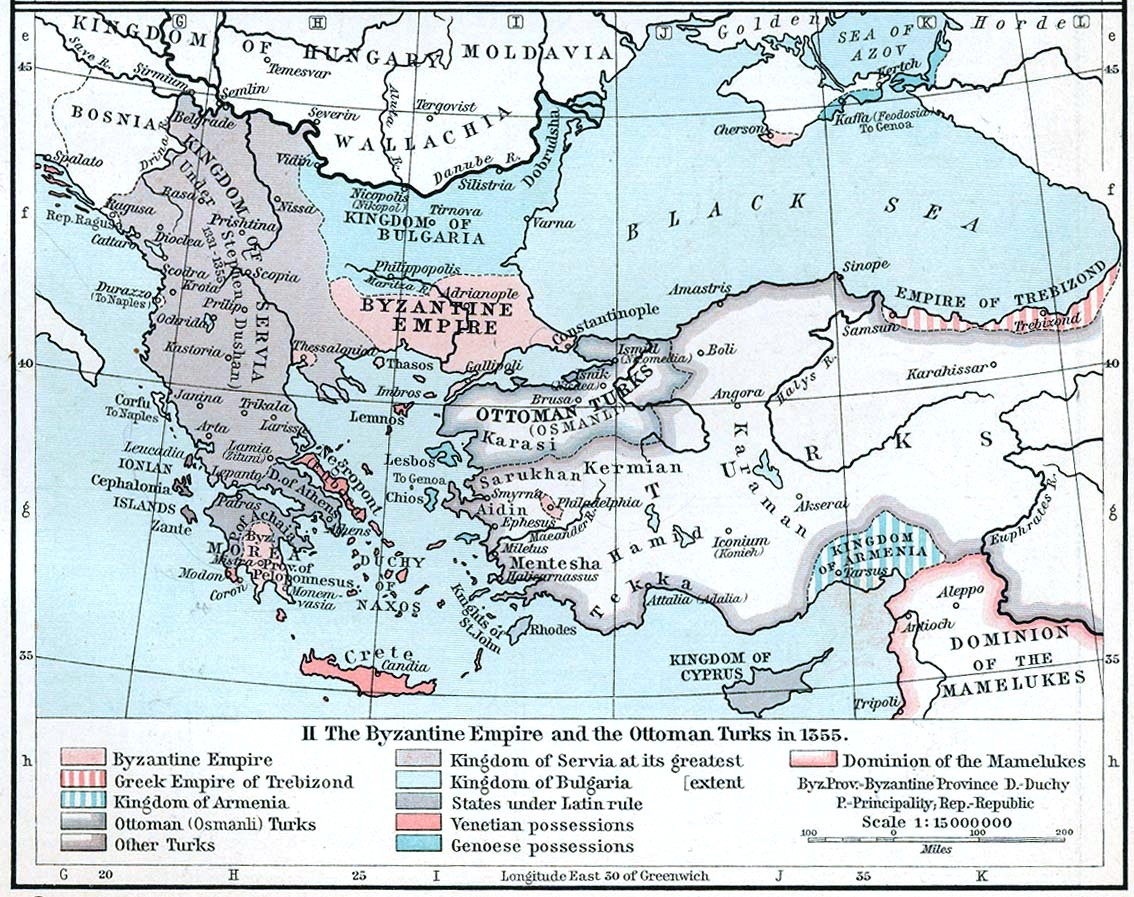
The rump of the Byzantine Empire and its neighbours in 1355. The disruption of the civil war and the interference of neighbouring states brought extensive losses of territory, mainly to Dušan's Serbia, which doubled in size.

On 8 February 1347, the war formally ended with an agreement making Kantakouzenos senior emperor for ten years, after which he and John V would reign as equals. Kantakouzenos also promised to pardon anyone who had fought against him. To seal the pact, John V married Kantakouzenos' daughter Helena, and in May, Kantakouzenos was crowned again in the Church of St. Mary of Blachernae. In the end, as Donald Nicol commented, the long conflict had been meaningless, with terms that "could have been agreed five years before and saved the Empire so much bitterness, hatred and destruction."

Despite the moderation and clemency shown by Kantakouzenos in this settlement, it did not gain universal acceptance. Supporters of the Palaiologoi still distrusted him, while his own partisans would have preferred to depose the Palaiologoi outright and install the Kantakouzenoi as the reigning dynasty. Kantakouzenos' eldest son, Matthew, also resented being passed over in favour of John V, and had to be placated with the creation of a semi-autonomous appanage covering much of western Thrace, which doubled as a march against Dušan's Serbia. Of the remaining Byzantine territories, only the Zealots in Thessalonica, now an isolated exclave surrounded by the Serbs, refused to acknowledge the new arrangement, instead leading a de facto independent existence until Kantakouzenos conquered them in 1350.

After 1347, John VI Kantakouzenos tried to revive the Empire, but met with limited success. Aided by the depopulation brought by about by the Black Death, Dušan and his general Preljub took Kantakouzenos' Macedonian strongholds as well as Epirus and Thessaly in 1347–1348, thereby completing their conquest of the remaining Byzantine lands in mainland Greece. An attempt to break Byzantium's dependence for food and maritime commerce on the Genoese merchants of Galata led to a Byzantine–Genoese war, which ended in 1352 with a compromise peace. In 1350, Kantakouzenos took advantage of Dušan's preoccupation with a war against Bosnia to recover Thessalonica from the Zealots as well as Berroia, Vodena and other Macedonian cities from the Serbs, but the Serbian emperor quickly reversed the Byzantine gains, leaving only Thessalonica in Byzantine hands.

Steadily deteriorating relations between Matthew Kantakouzenos, who now ruled eastern Thrace, and John V Palaiologos, who had taken over Matthew's former domain in western Thrace, led to yet another internal conflict. Open warfare broke out in 1352, when John V, supported by Venetian and Turkish troops, launched an attack on Matthew Kantakouzenos. John Kantakouzenos came to his son's aid with 10,000 Ottoman troops who retook the cities of Thrace, liberally plundering them in the process. In October 1352, at Demotika, the Ottoman force met and defeated 4,000 Serbs provided to John V by Stefan Dušan. This was the Ottomans' first victory in Europe and an ominous portent. Two years later their capture of Gallipoli marked the beginning of the Ottoman conquest of the Balkans, which culminated a century later in the Fall of Constantinople. Meanwhile, John V fled to the island of Tenedos, from where he made an unsuccessful attempt to seize Constantinople in March 1353. John VI Kantakouzenos responded by having Matthew crowned as co-emperor, but John V Palaiologos, enlisting Genoese support and relying on the declining popularity of Kantakouzenos, succeeded in entering the capital in November 1354. John VI abdicated and retired to a monastery. Matthew held out in Thrace until 1357, when he too abdicated, leaving John V Palaiologos as the sole master of a rump state.

== Consequences ==
"Upon the death of the young Andronikos [III], the worst civil war that the Romans had ever known broke out. It was a war that led to almost total destruction, reducing the great Empire of the Romans to a feeble shadow of its former self."

— Memoirs of John Kantakouzenos, Book III.

The civil war proved a critical turning point in the history of the Byzantine Empire. In the words of the Byzantinist Angeliki Laiou, "after the end of the second civil war, Byzantium was an empire in name only", while according to Eva de Vries-Van der Velden, it marks "the point of rupture between the 'decline' and 'the fall' of the Byzantine Empire".

The Byzantines' division and reliance on foreign troops, especially the Serbs and Turks, encouraged the latter's expansionism. Stefan Dušan in particular proved adept in exploiting the civil war to expand his state at Byzantium's expense. Aside from huge territorial losses, the prolonged conflict exhausted the Byzantine state's resources, as it brought "anarchy to the cities and devastation to the countryside" (Alice-Mary Talbot). Thrace, the largest contiguous territory remaining in the Empire, suffered such destruction that, along with Constantinople, it became dependent on grain imported from Bulgaria and the Crimea. Trade had stopped, and the treasury contained, in the words of Gregoras, "nothing but the atoms of Epicurus". Kantakouzenos had exhausted his own personal fortune, and Empress Anne had left the Empire heavily indebted to the Venetians. The war also led to the collapse of the centralized imperial administration in the provinces, causing control of the Thracian countryside to shift to a manorial system run by the local magnates. Despite their considerable wealth, the magnates, through exemptions or outright evasion, managed to avoid paying taxes to the imperial government. In addition, the arrival in 1347 of the Black Death and its recurrent outbreaks further reduced the Empire's tax and recruitment base, curtailing its ability to reverse the Serbian territorial gains.

Along with the renewal of the civil war in 1352, these factors destroyed any chance of even a modest recovery similar to that experienced under Andronikos III. Thereafter, Byzantium remained under the menacing threat of stronger neighbours, unable to pursue an independent foreign policy, handicapped by a shortage of resources and riven by internal strife. Nevertheless, through a combination of fortuitous external circumstances and adroit diplomacy, it survived for another century, until finally conquered by the Ottomans in 1453. Only the Byzantine exclave in the Morea remained prosperous, having been spared the ravages of the civil war because of its relative isolation. The appointment of Manuel Kantakouzenos as its despotes in 1349 heralded the creation of the semi-independent Despotate of the Morea, which experienced the last economic and cultural flowering of the Byzantine world before it too fell to the Ottomans in 1460.

== Sources ==
- Bartusis, Mark C. (1997), The Late Byzantine Army: Arms and Society 1204–1453, University of Pennsylvania Press, ISBN 978-0-8122-1620-2
- de Vries-Van der Velden, Eva (1989), L'élite byzantine devant l'avance turque à l'époque de la guerre civile de 1341 à 1354 (in French), Amsterdam: J.C. Gieben, ISBN 978-90-5063-026-9
- Fine, John V. A. (1994) [1987]. The Late Medieval Balkans: A Critical Survey from the Late Twelfth Century to the Ottoman Conquest. Ann Arbor, Michigan: University of Michigan Press. ISBN 978-0-472-10079-8.
- Jeffreys, Elizabeth; Haldon, John; Cormack, Robin, eds. (2009), The Oxford Handbook of Byzantine Studies, Oxford University Press, ISBN 978-0-19-925246-6
- Kazhdan, Alexander, ed. (1991). The Oxford Dictionary of Byzantium. Oxford and New York: Oxford University Press. ISBN 0-19-504652-8.
- Laiou, Angeliki E. (2002), "Political History: An Outline", in Laiou, Angeliki E. (ed.), The Economic History of Byzantium: From the Seventh through the Fifteenth Century, Dumbarton Oaks, ISBN 978-0-88402-332-6
- Lascaratos, J.; Marketos, S. (1997), "The fatal disease of the Byzantine Emperor Andronicus III Palaeologus (1328–1341 A.D.)", Journal of the Royal Society of Medicine, 90 (2): 106–109, doi:10.1177/014107689709000215, PMC 1296151, PMID 9068444
- Nicol, Donald MacGillivray (1979), Church and Society in the Last Centuries of Byzantium, Cambridge University Press, ISBN 978-0-521-22438-3
- Nicol, Donald M. (1993) [1972]. The Last Centuries of Byzantium, 1261–1453 (Second ed.). Cambridge: Cambridge University Press. ISBN 978-0-521-43991-6.
- Nicol, Donald MacGillivray (1996), The Reluctant Emperor: A Biography of John Cantacuzene, Byzantine Emperor and Monk, c. 1295–1383, Cambridge University Press, ISBN 978-0-521-52201-4
- Oikonomides, Nicolas (1988), "Byzantium between East and West (XIII–XV cent.)", in Howard-Johnston, J.D. (ed.), Byzantium and the West c.850–c.1200: Proceedings of the XVIII Spring Symposium of Byzantine Studies, Oxford 30th March–1st April 1984, Amsterdam: A.M. Hakkert, pp. 319–332, ISBN 978-0-902566-19-4
- Reinert, Stephen W. (2002), "Fragmentation (1204–1453)", in Mango, Cyril (ed.), The Oxford History of Byzantium, Oxford and New York: Oxford University Press, pp. 248–283, ISBN 978-0-19-814098-6
- Soulis, George Christos (1984), The Serbs and Byzantium during the reign of Tsar Stephen Dušan (1331–1355) and his successors, Dumbarton Oaks, ISBN 978-0-88402-137-7
- Treadgold, Warren (1997). A History of the Byzantine State and Society. Stanford, California: Stanford University Press. ISBN 0-8047-2630-2.
- Weiss, Günter (1969), Joannes Kantakuzenos – Aristokrat, Staatsmann, Kaiser und Mönch – in der Gesellschaftsentwicklung von Byzanz im 14. Jahrhundert (in German), Wiesbaden: Otto Harrassowitz
