= Kavarna =

- Town
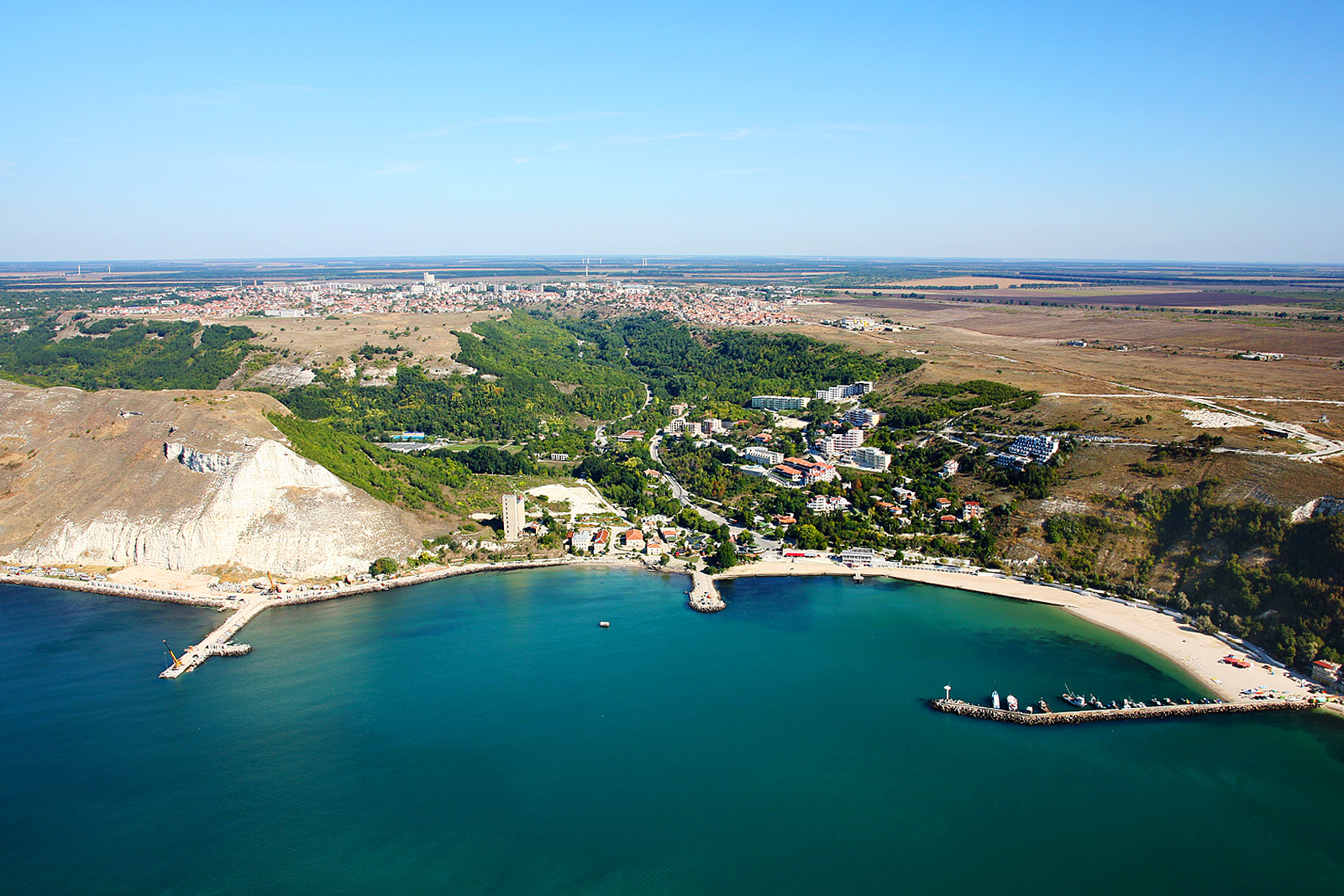

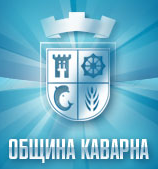
- Coat of arms

- Location of Kavarna
- Coordinates: 43°25′59″N 28°20′18″E
- Country: Bulgaria
- Province (Oblast): Dobrich

Government
  - Mayor: Elena Baltajieva
- Elevation: 121 m (397 ft)

Population (31.12.2009)
  - Town: 11,397
  - Urban: 15,834
- Time zone: UTC+2 (EET)
  - Summer (DST): UTC+3 (EEST)
- Postal Code: 9650
- Area code: +359 570

Kavarna (Bulgarian: Каварна [kɐˈvarnɐ], Greek: Καβάρνα) is a Black Sea coastal town and seaside resort in the Dobruja region of northeastern Bulgaria. It lies 42 kilometres (26 miles) northeast of Varna, 43 km (27 mi) from Dobrich, and 43 km (27 mi) south of the border with Romania. It is the principal town of Kavarna Municipality, part of Dobrich Province. As of December 2009, the town had a population of 11,397. A little yacht port, a fishing base, a spacious beach and a resort complex exist in the town. The landmark Cape Kaliakra is located a few kilometers to the east, as is the tiny beachfront resort of Rusalka. Three 18-hole golf courses with villa communities and marinas are being developed nearby, two of the courses are designed by Gary Player and one by Ian Woosnam.

During the 2000s, the town became famous with the annual Kaliakra Rock Fest featuring famous rock bands from around the world.

== Etymology ==
With the Bulgarian conquest in the 7th century AD, the name Karvuna replaced the similarly-sounding ancient Greek Krounoi as the then name of the neighboring modern town of Balchik; the names Karvunska Hora and Principality of Karvuna were related to that town, which was also mentioned on 14th-century Italian portolan charts with the Italianized form Carbona.

The name Kavarna as referring to this city was first mentioned in the 15th century; perhaps it was a new name influenced phonetically by the preexisting names of Karvuna (which town was already known as Balchik) and Varna.

== Geography ==
The lay of the land is flat and the seacoast of Kavarna is 42 km (26 mi) long. Along it there are small beaches, including an artificial one. Gore Chirakman with its almost sheer slopes towers above the seacoast. Remains of stronghold walls, moats, buildings, churches and necropolises can be found on the flat plateau. The region is rich in mineral waters.

The area around Kavarna offers opportunities for developing ecotourism and specialized tourism — examination and photography of plants, dolphins and various kinds of fish in the coastal waters. The variety of birds attracts tourists from all parts of the world and contributes to Kaliakra and Yaylata becoming one of the most preferred places in Bulgaria for the development of ornithological tourism.

== Population ==
Kavarna
Year	1887	1910	1934	1946	1956	1965	1975	1985	1992	2001	2005	2009	2011	2021
Population	no data	no data	no data	5,652	7,053	8,300	10,881	12,033	12,139	11,479	11,415	11,397	??	??
	Highest number ?? in ??													
Sources: National Statistical Institute, citypopulation.de, pop-stat.mashke.org, Bulgarian Academy of Sciences

== History ==
=== Archaic and classical antiquity ===
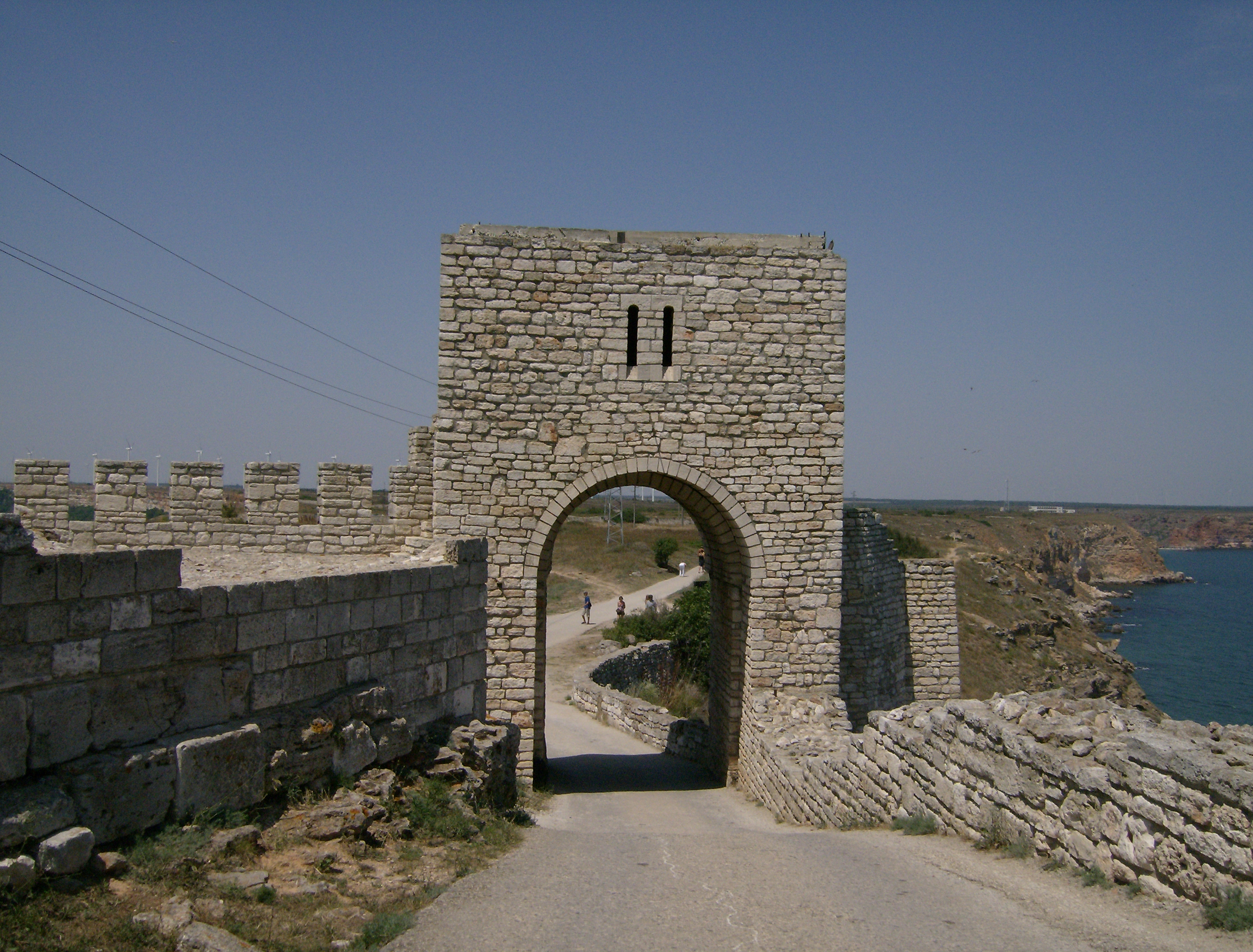
Kaliakra

Kavarna's origins lie in a Thracian settlement established between the 9th and 7th centuries BCE. It was later re-founded by Greek colonists as Byzone (or Bizone) (Ancient Greek: Βιζώνη), a secondary colony of Mesembria (modern-day Nesebar), a Megarian colony, likely in the 5th or early 4th century BCE.

During its early period, Byzone was home to a mixed population, consisting of Greeks, Thracians, and hybrid Greek-Thracian communities. In the Hellenistic period, it is believed that some Scythians also settled in the area. By this time, Byzone had grown into an important port and commercial hub, facilitating trade between the local Thracian and Scythian populations and merchants from mainland Greece, Asia Minor, and the Aegean islands. Goods such as ceramics, bronze vessels, weaponry, wine, and olive oil were imported, while the region exported grain, timber, and raw materials to cities across the Greek world. During the 3rd and 2nd century BC, the town played an important mediating role between the local Thracian settlements and the Greeks. Despite being unsuitable for wharfing because of its rugged cliffs, this part of the Bulgarian Black Sea Coast was an attractive centre due to the fact that the local people produced and traded with high quality grain.

In the 1st century BCE, a disastrous earthquake struck the area, causing significant damage to Byzone. The disaster led to the destruction of much of the town, with a large part of its rocky promontory collapsing into the Black Sea's waters. According to the leader of the finished first part of the underwater archaeological expedition Kavarna 2005, Asen Salkin, the Roman town of Bizone has sunk two times in the sea. For that evidence the located form skin-divers borders of a sunk residential district of the town of Bizone in Kavarna's coast. For the presence of residential buildings the archaeologists judge by the found ashlars and parts of brick walls. The finds date from the 2nd century AD. According to the leader of the expedition this residential district has nothing in common with the disastrous earthquake from the 1st century BC. The underwater finds evidence for other phenomenon, for which the scientists express only suppositions, such as transgression and regression of the strata. It has started to transgress during the 1st century AD and this has continued to the 2nd century. It is possible that during this period the coast had risen by four metres and one day it suddenly fallen through.

A smaller settlement and port emerged on the site during Roman times, but it never regained its former prominence as a major trade center. Even in the late Roman period, the town was unable to recover its earlier status, and remained of lesser importance.

=== Medieval period ===
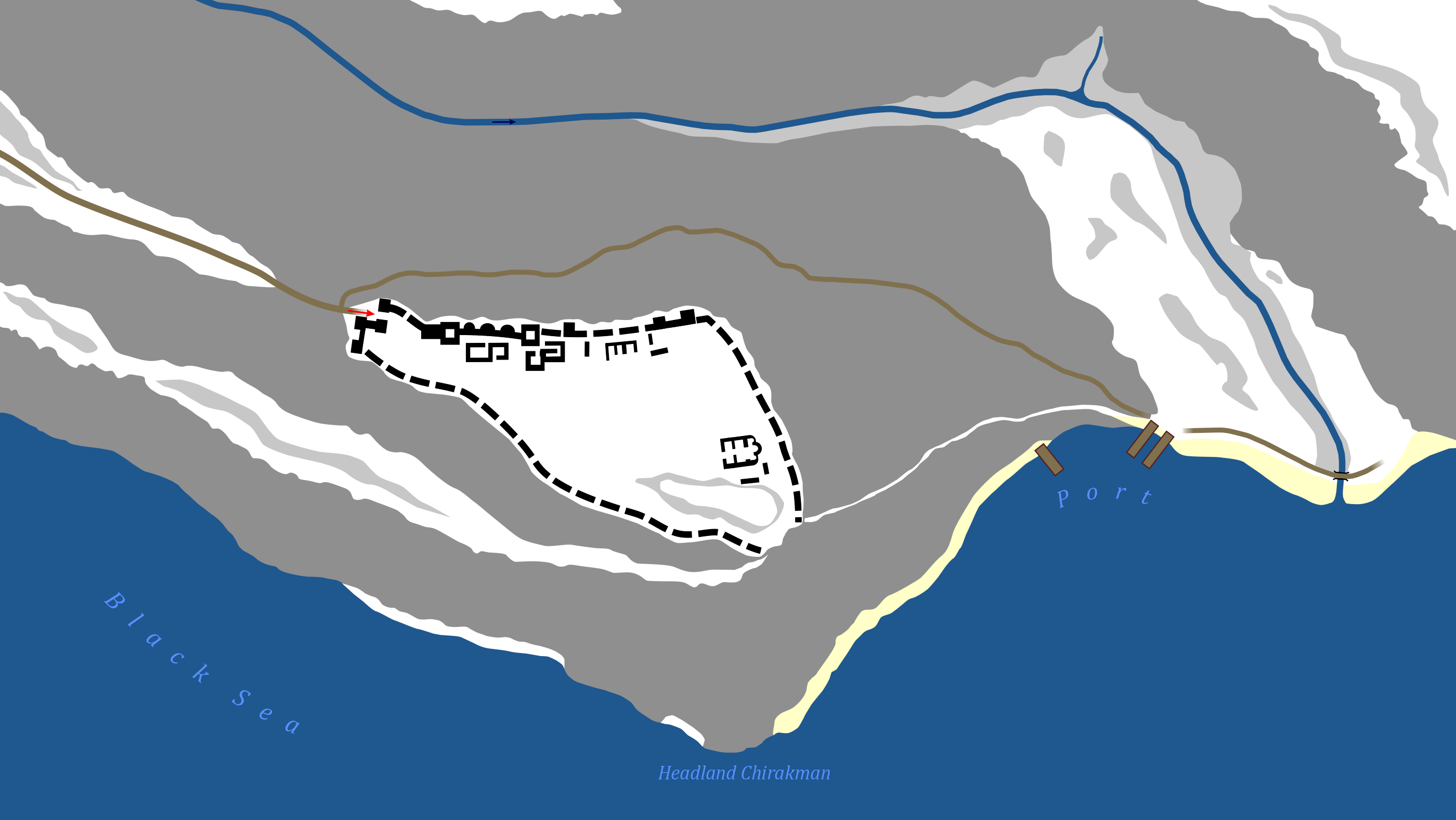
Kavarna fortress plan

In the 7th century AD the Slavs and Asparuh's Bulgars destroyed the Byzantine town and later founded a new settlement, which entered the First Bulgarian Empire. In the late Middle Ages the settlement grew and was subject to Tatar raids; in the 14th century it became part of the Principality of Karvuna, which de facto broke away from the Second Bulgarian Empire under the rule of the despots Balik and Dobrotitsa of the Bulgarian royal Terter dynasty. In 1397, the Ottoman Turks nearly destroyed the city, which was abandoned but resettled again and rebuilt by the early 17th century. Its present name was documented for the first time in the early 15th century.

The town was considered an economical and cultural centre during Antiquity and the Middle Ages with rich and various remains – stronghold walls, early-Christian basilica, medieval churches, and public buildings.

Notable works of art, such as coins from different historical epochs, golden adornments, a golden Thracian treasure of applications, have been found in the area.

=== Modern period ===
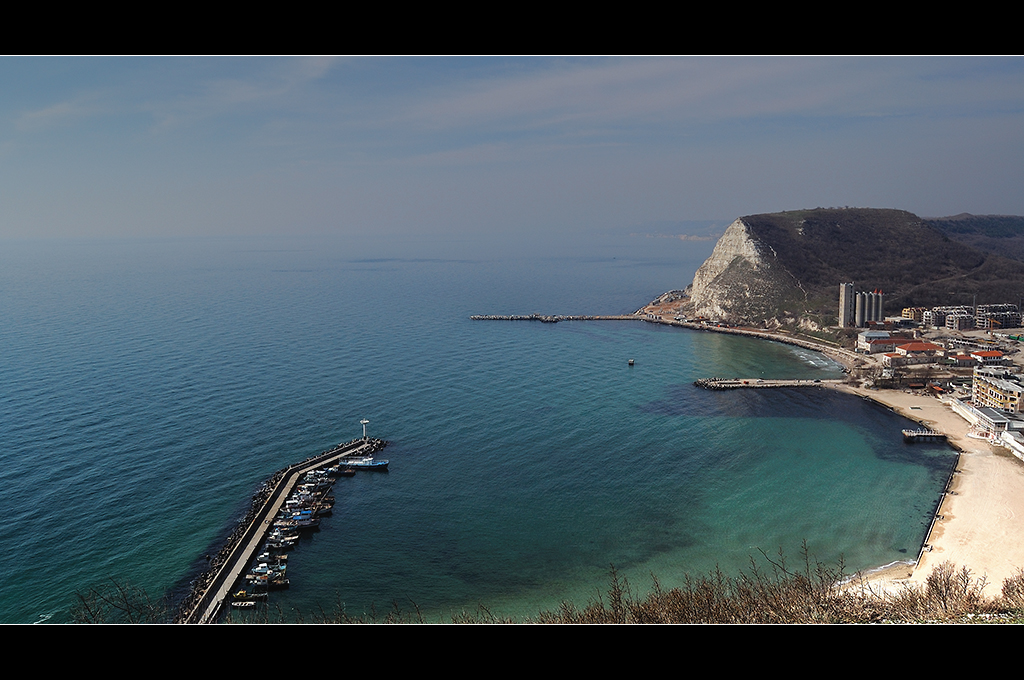
View of Kavarna

Between the 15th and 19th century the town becomes popular under the name Kavarna, as a Christian settlement and port for grain export. From that time remain a hammam (bathhouse), a medieval necropolis, a bridge, fountains, Christian churches and many inscriptions.

During the Russo-Turkish War of 1877–1878 Kavarna's Christian inhabitants, Bulgarians and Gagauz alike, rebelled against the bashi-bazouks and Circassian hordes in what came to be known as the Kavarna massacre or Kavarna uprising. After the liberation, the town became part of the Principality of Bulgaria.

From the beginning of 20th century Kavarna achieved a rapid progress as an economical and cultural centre. The town renamed Cavarna came under Romanian rule after the Second Balkan War in 1913 and again after the First World War in 1919. This however, was met with resistance by the local Bulgarian population and its Internal Dobrujan Revolutionary Organisation. In 1940 the town was ceded back to Bulgaria by the Treaty of Craiova.

== Monuments and museums ==
=== Dobruja and the Sea Display ===
The Dobruja and the Sea Display is a small maritime museum. It is situated in an approximately restored Turkish bath, the Hamam. It was built in the beginning of the 15th century and represents a massive beehive bath from stone, situated in the beginning of the valley leading to the port, and half a kilometre apart from the town centre. Many stone anchors, amphorae and ceramics found during the underwater archaeological expeditions are exposed there. Coins from different epochs and a golden Thracian treasure can be seen in the Treasure House Hall The ancient and mediaeval colour painting expend our concepts for the ancient navigation around Dobruja's coasts.

=== Town Museum ===
The Town Museum can be found in the building of the local library. Materials, revealing the thousand-year old history of the town are displayed in its exposition. Evidence for the life of the people in the region since ancient times are represented here. A model of prehistoric cave-dwellings, many tools, guns, rifles and pistols from the War of Liberation, as well as ethnographic materials — clothing, finery, folk-style cloth, are also exhibited

=== Ethnographic Museum ===
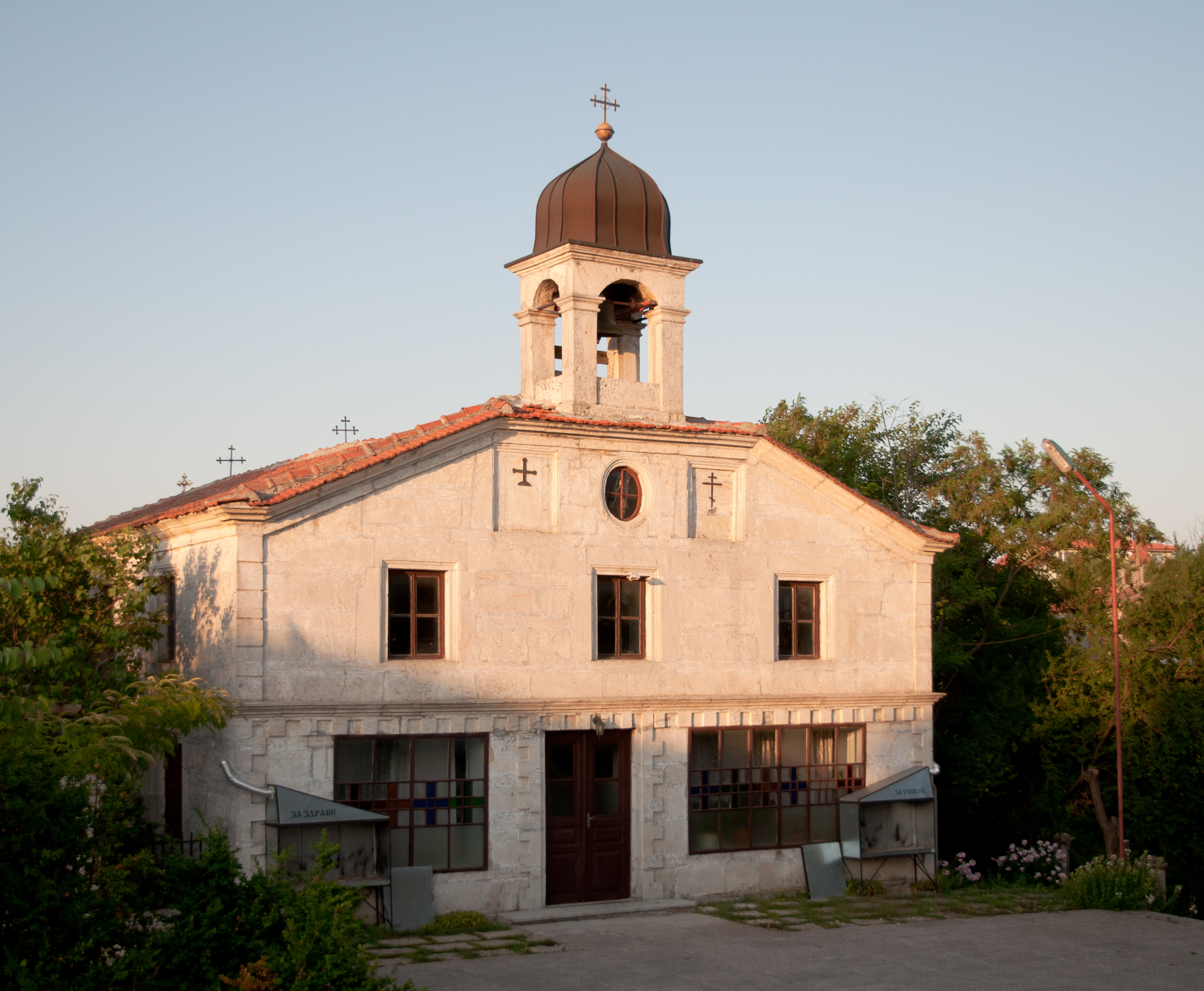
Dormition of the Theotokos Church.

The Ethnographic Museum represents an old house from the end of the 19th century that belonged to a rich family. Its interior reveals the customs and culture of the people inhabiting that part of the country; premises typical for Dobruja houses, tools from the culture and the daily round of the people. The building is surrounded by a garden full of mulberry trees, peonies and tulips.

=== Churches ===
There are two churches in the town both located in the town centre. The Church of Saint George was built in 1836 and the Dormition of the Theotokos Church in 1860. Both churches played an important role during the Ottoman rule and after the Liberation as educational and cultural centers.

=== The old fountains ===
These were 12 spring fountains situated along the valley to the port. Some of them were destroyed and the rest were restored recently. The great amount of spring water forms a small river.

== Culture ==
Since 2004 the town has turned in one of the centres of musical life in Bulgaria. Kavarna has been the host to several rock and roll concerts. In 2005 the most popular band to play in the town's stadium was Deep Purple. The other notable performers were mostly legends of German rock and heavy metal music, such as Scorpions, Axel Rudi Pell, Gamma Ray, Masterplan and Destruction. On 27 August 2005 Accept, another German band, played here its last show with original lead vocalist Udo Dirkschneider. There is also a mural of Whitesnake singer David Coverdale.

2006 saw the start of the Kaliakra Rock Fest - A Metal festival (renamed to Kavarna Rock Fest in 2010) including many metal bands. The same year followed the tradition with concerts of more metal bands as well as some pop and dance musicians.

In 2007, performers included Heaven and Hell, John Lawton Band, Manowar, Motörhead, Robert Plant, and Ronnie James Dio. The next year saw the return of Manowar within Kaliakra Rock Fest with a 5-hour attempt to set a world record for the longest heavy metal concert. The next two days Alice Cooper, Slayer and In Flames held concerts. In July 2009, Mötley Crüe headlined the rock-fest, with Scorpions, Blind Guardian and Dream Theater also participating. Sonata Arctica also performed in 2008 and 2011.

The 2013 Volvo World Match Play Championship was held at the Thracian Cliffs Golf Course.

== International relations ==
=== Twin towns and sister cities ===
Kavarna is twinned with:

- Podolsk, Russia
- Prizren, Kosovo

=== Honour ===
Kavarna Cove in Livingston Island in the South Shetland Islands, Antarctica is named after Kavarna. Kavarna Coffeehouse in Green Bay, Wisconsin is named after Kavarna.

== See also ==
Kavarna uprising

== Gallery ==
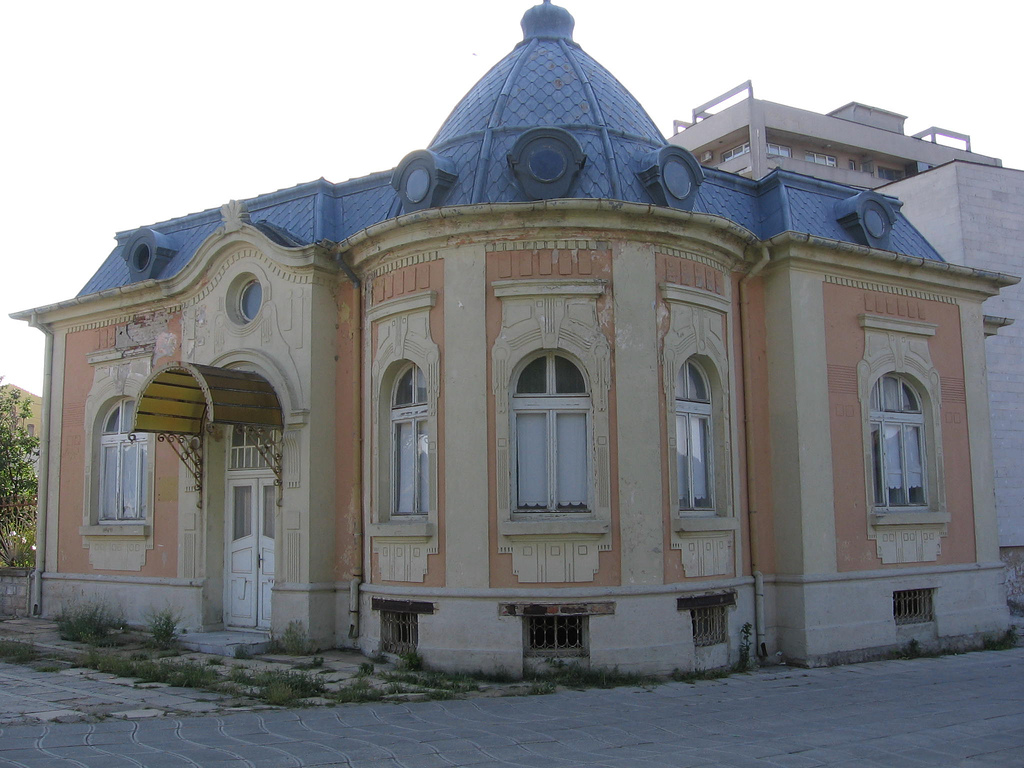
Architecture of Kavarna

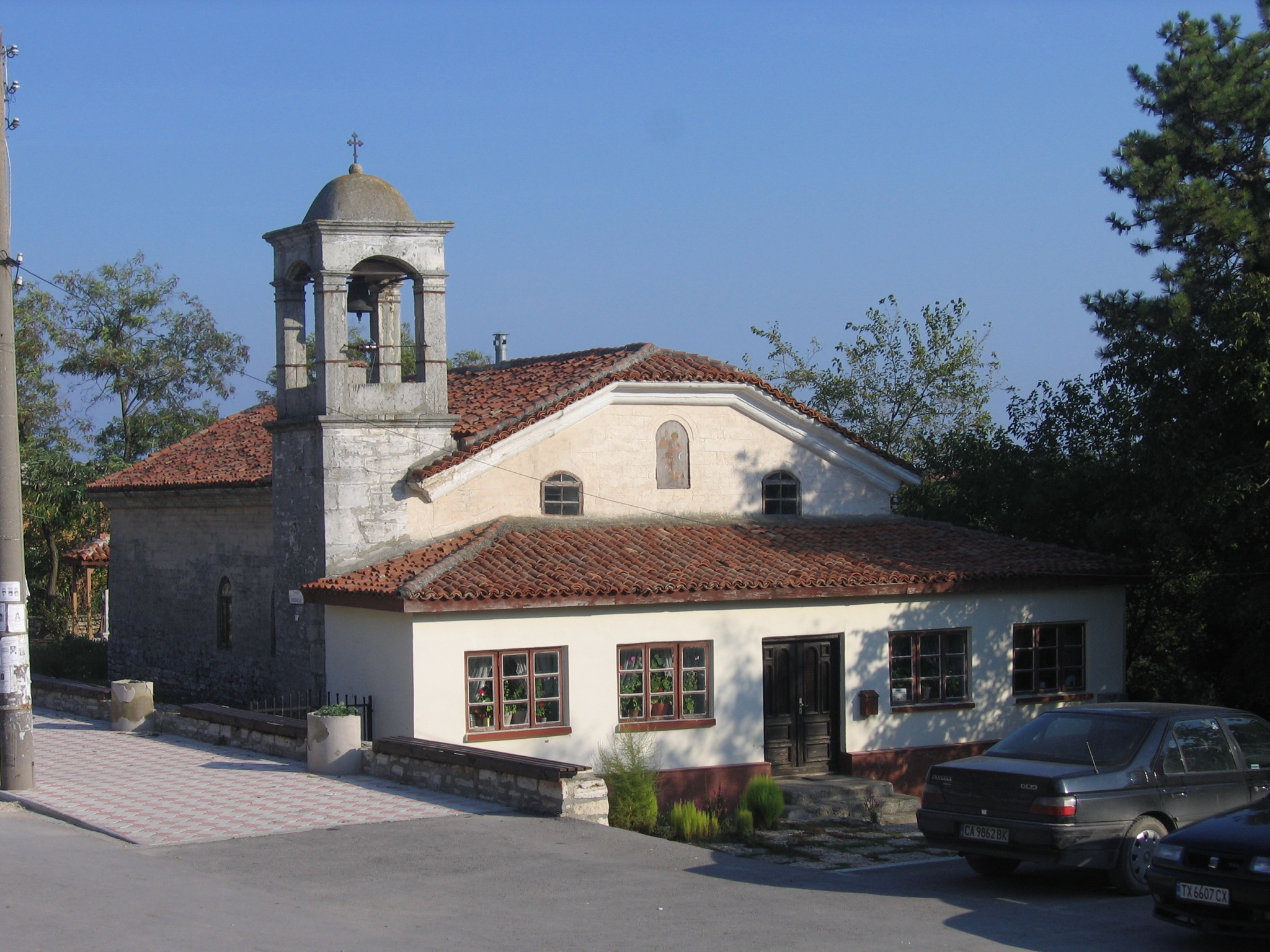
Church in Kavarna

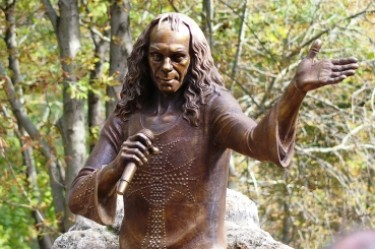
Ronnie James Dio statue

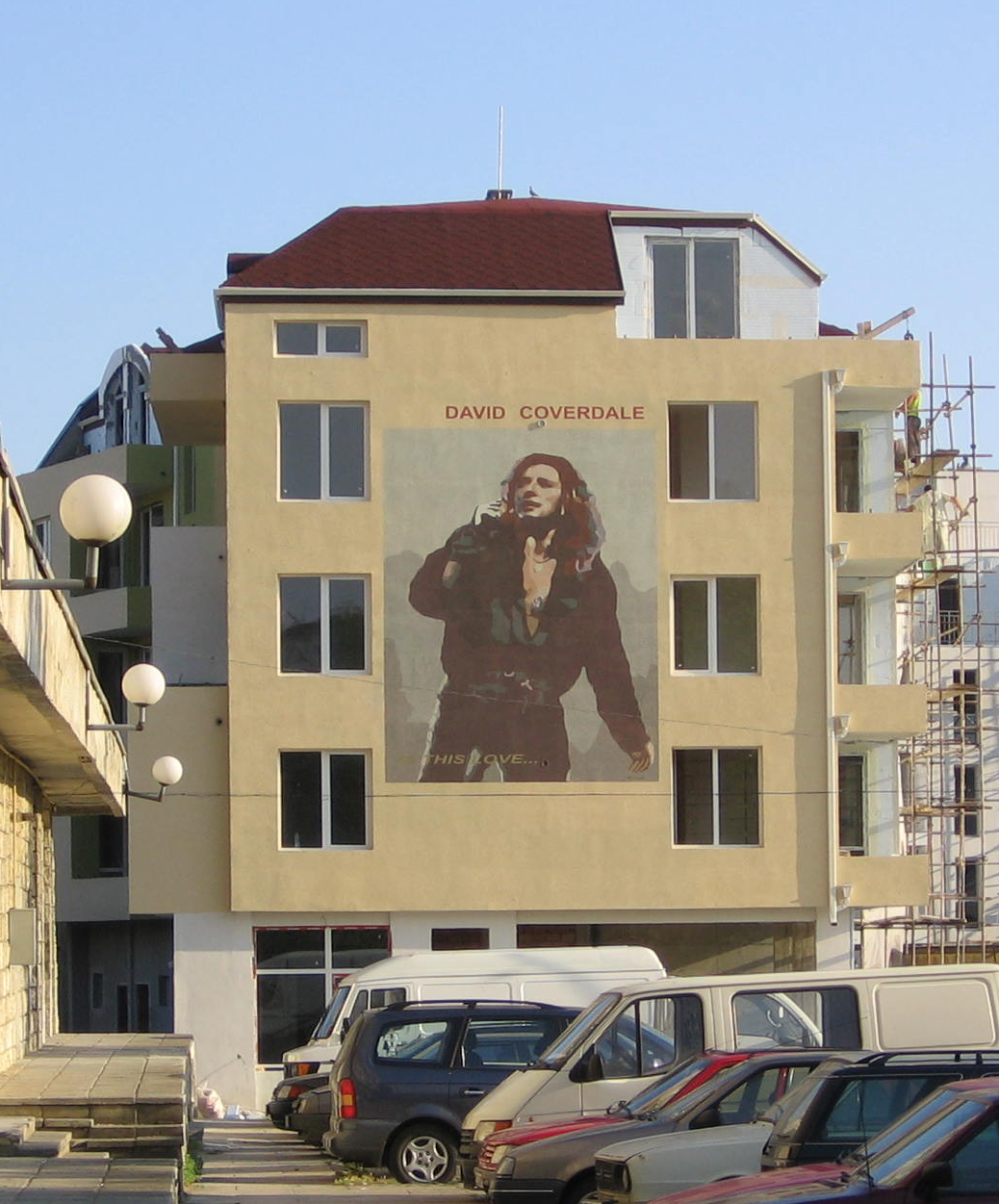
David Coverdale mural
