= George Phakrases =

George Phakrases (Greek: Γεώργιος Φακρασῆς, fl. 1342–55) was a Byzantine nobleman and general, notable as a supporter of John VI Kantakouzenos in the Byzantine civil war of 1341–47.

Phakrases was an early adherent of Kantakouzenos, and in 1342–43 commanded the latter's cavalry at Didymoteicho. By 1346, he had been raised to the rank of protostrator, and in that year dealt a crushing defeat near Selymbria on the forces of Dobrotitsa of the Despotate of Dobruja, who had been called upon to aid the regency by the Empress-dowager Anna of Savoy. Dobrotitsa himself was taken prisoner, but managed to escape to Constantinople soon after.

After Kantakouzenos' victory in the civil war, in 1351 Phakrases led part of the army, under Manuel Asen (a brother of Empress Irene Asanina) in the failed siege of the Genoese colony of Galata. In 1355 he wrote a summary of the theological disputation between Gregory Palamas and Nikephoros Gregoras over the Hesychast controversy.

== Sources ==
- Guilland, Rodolphe (1967). "Le Protostrator". Recherches sur les institutions byzantines [Studies on the Byzantine Institutions]. Berliner byzantinische Arbeiten 35 (in French). Vol. I. Berlin and Amsterdam: Akademie-Verlag & Adolf M. Hakkert. pp. 478–497. OCLC 878894516.
- Trapp, Erich; Beyer, Hans-Veit; Kaplaneres, Sokrates; Leontiadis, Ioannis (1994). Prosopographisches Lexikon der Palaiologenzeit (in German). Vol. 12. Vienna: Verlag der Österreichischen Akademie der Wissenschaften. ISBN 3-7001-3003-1.
