= Sarukhanids =

Historic principality

Coordinates: 40.2894°N 45.1342°E

The Sarukhanids or Sarukhanid dynasty (Modern Turkish: Saruhanoğulları, Saruhanoğulları Beyliği), also known as the Principality of Saruhan and Beylik of Saruhan (Saruhan Beyliği), was one of the Turkish Anatolian beyliks (principality), centered in Manisa.

Although the origin of Saruhanids is not known, there are theories that they may be of Oghuz or Kipchak origin. Some researchers attribute the origins of Saruhanids to the "Sarı" tribe of Kipchak-Kimeks. The Saruhanids It was founded by the tribal chief Saruhan about 1300 and lasted for a first time until 1390, when Bayezid I overran the region and finally until 1412, when the Ottoman Sultan Mehmed I killed Hızır, the last Saruhan ruler, and absorbed the Beylik into the Ottoman Empire as a province.

== History ==
The founder of the beylik, Sarukhan Bey, began his military career as an emir of the Germiyanids. Sometime at the beginning of the 14th century, he seized territories for himself in the Gediz River (Hermus under its previous Byzantine rulers) valley and founded a dynasty that started to rule the region from its base in Manisa. Its principal towns included Menemen, Gördes, Demirci, Nif, and Kasaba.

== Legacies ==
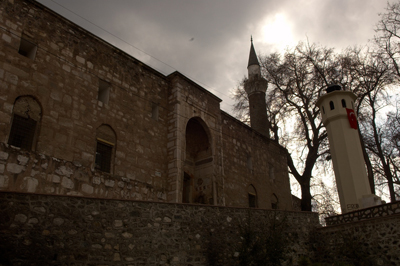
Great Mosque of Manisa, built in 1374, during the period of the Sarukhan dynasty reign

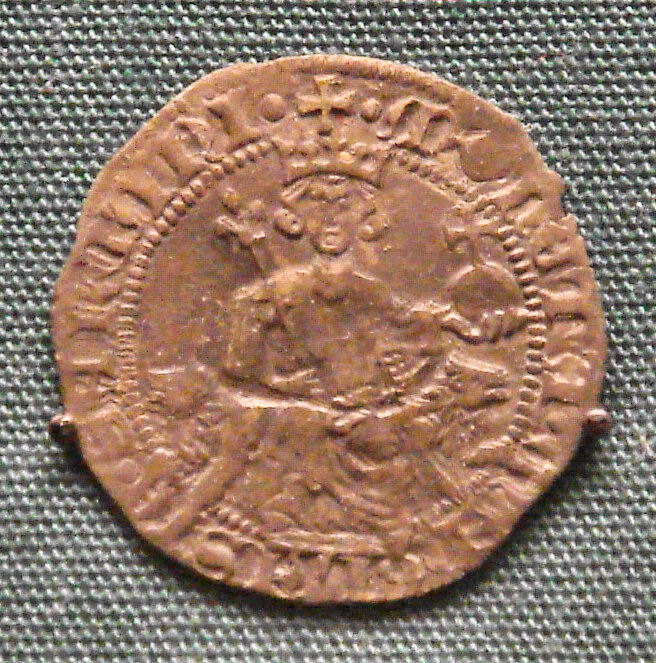
Silver gigliato of Sarukhan, Bey of Magnesia, 1313–1348, ruler of Lydia, western Anatolia.

The dynasty's period as a regional power is largely limited to the long reign of its founder, Sarukhan Bey (d. 1346), under whom the principality became a naval power in the Aegean Sea, and regularly battled with the fleets of the Republic of Genoa and the Dukes of Naxos.

The most enduring monument of the Sarukhan dynasty is the Great Mosque at Manisa. Constructed in 1374 by İshak Bey, the mosque has a prayer hall covered by a dome 14m in diameter. Attached to the prayer hall is an innovative, semi-covered forecourt. The building likely served as inspiration for the Üç Şerefeli Mosque, constructed some sixty years later by the Ottoman sultan Murad II.

The region roughly corresponding to the area of extension of Sarukhan dynasty's administration became an Ottoman sub-province (sanjak) under the continued name of Sarukhan until the early years of the Republic of Turkey.

== List of rulers ==
1. Saruhan Bey (1313–1346)
2. Fahrüddin İlyas Bey (1346–1362)
3. Muzafferüddin İshak Bey (1362–1388)
4. Hızırşah (1362–1390)

Under Ottoman rule (1390–1402):

5. Orhan Bey (1402–1404)
6. Hızırşah Bey (1404–1410)
7. Orhan Bey (1410–1412)

== See also ==
- Anatolian beyliks

== Sources ==
- Vryonis, Speros (1971). The Decline of Medieval Hellenism in Asia Minor and the Process of Islamization from the Eleventh through the Fifteenth Century. Publications of the Center for Medieval and Renaissance Studies. Vol. 4. Los Angeles: University of California Press. pp. 138–39. ISBN 0-520-01597-5.
- Flood, Finbarr Barry; Necipoglu, Gulru (16 June 2017). A Companion to Islamic Art and Architecture. John Wiley & Sons. ISBN 978-1-119-06857-0.
