= Theodore of Dobruja =

Bulgarian noble

Theodore of Dobruja was a Bulgarian noble. He was brother of Balik the founder of the Despotate of Dobruja, and his successor Dobrotitsa.

In 1346, Theodore and Dobrotitsa were sent along with 1,000 soldiers by Balik to help Byzantine Empress Anna of Savoy in the civil war against John VI Kantakouzenos, but were defeated. In 1347, Umur Beg of Aydin led a naval expedition against Dobruja on behalf of the emperor John V Palaiologos, in which Theodore and Balik died.

== Bibliography ==
- Bartusis, Mark C. (1997), The Late Byzantine Army: Arms and Society 1204–1453, University of Pennsylvania Press, ISBN 0-8122-1620-2
