= Siege of Serres =

Battle during the Byzantine civil war of 1341–1347

- Part of the Byzantine civil war of 1341–1347
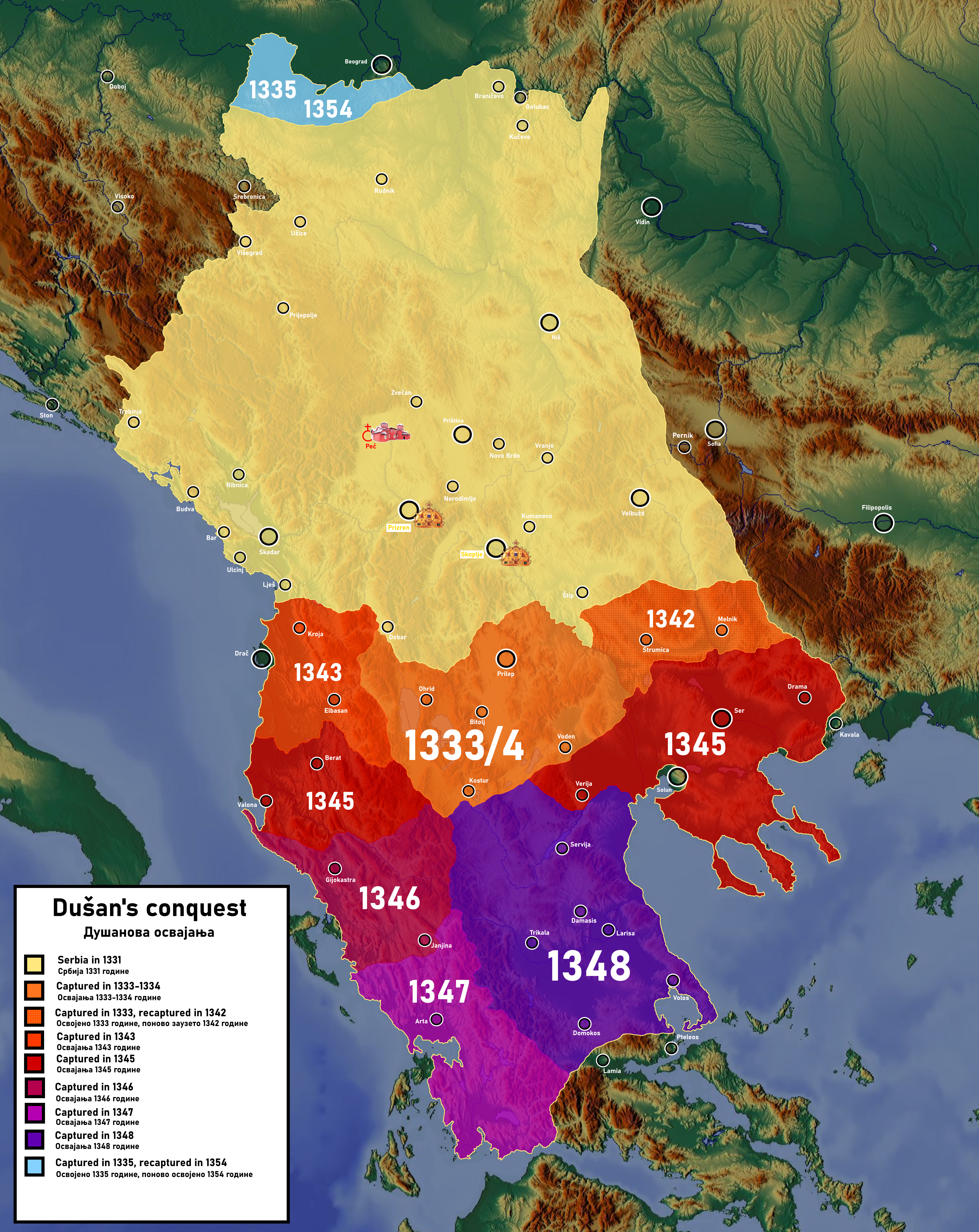
- Expansion of Serbian state during the reign of Stefan Dušan
Date	25 September 1345
Location	Serres, Byzantine Empire (now in Greece)
Result	Serbian victory

Belligerents
(Serbian Empire) Serbian Kingdom	Byzantine Empire

Commanders and leaders
(Serbian Empire) Stefan Dušan	Unknown

Strength
Unknown	Unknown

The siege of Serres (Serbian: oпсада Сера, Greek: Πολιορκία των Σερρών) was fought during the Byzantine civil war of 1341–1347.

== Background ==
On 15 June 1341 Byzantine Emperor Adronicos III Palaiologos died unexpectedly. Serbian king Stefan Dušan immediately took advantage of his death to dispatch a raiding party that penetrated deep into Macedonia.

In late summer 1342, John VI Kantakouzenos, accompanied by several Serbian magnates, marched into Macedonia at the head of a Greek and Serbian force. His advance was stopped almost immediately before Serres when the city refused to surrender, and the subsequent siege had to be abandoned after an epidemic killed most of his men, forcing him to retreat into Serbia with a rump force of barely 500 soldiers. Dushan led a more successful parallel campaign, capturing Vodena (Edessa).

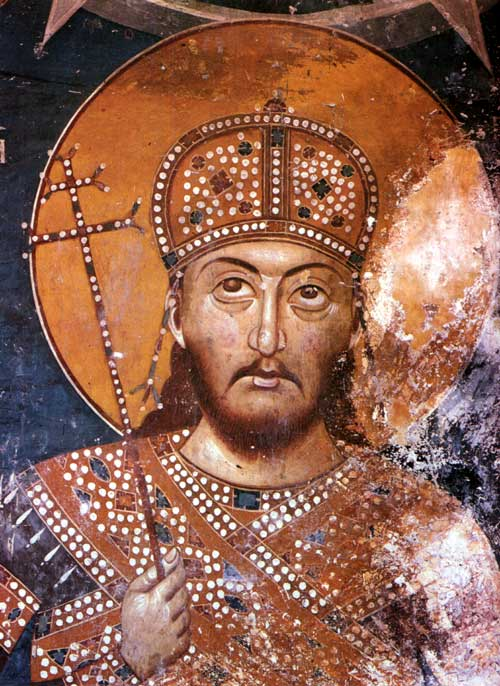
Fresco of Stefan Dušan, monastery of Lesnovo

== Siege ==
In 1345, three years after the unsuccessful siege, Dušan finally decided to take Serres. He gathered his forces around Strumica and headed for the town. During the siege, Kantakouzenos send an envoy, warning him if he did not lift the siege, he would turn against him. A clash appeared inevitable until the murder of Alexios Apokaukos, Kantakouzenos' chief rival, in Constantinople forced Kantakouzenos to direct his attention there.

== Aftermath ==
After the fall of Serres, the Serbian ruler controlled about half of the pre-1341 Byzantine realm. Spurred by this success he laid his own claim on the Byzantine throne. Consequently, on Easter Sunday, 16 April 1346, he was crowned "Emperor of the Serbs and the Romans" in Skopje, thereby founding the Serbian Empire.

In December 1355 Stefan Dušan died, leaving his son, Stefan Uros V all the conquered lands. The inexperienced and young Tsar lost most of newly conquered lands. After the Battle of Maritsa, Turkish way to the Balkans was now open.

== Sources ==
- Fine, John V. A. (1994) [1987]. The Late Medieval Balkans: A Critical Survey from the Late Twelfth Century to the Ottoman Conquest. Ann Arbor, Michigan: University of Michigan Press. ISBN 978-0-472-10079-8.
- Nicol, Donald M. (1993) [1972]. The Last Centuries of Byzantium, 1261–1453 (Second ed.). Cambridge: Cambridge University Press. ISBN 978-0-521-43991-6.
- Nicol, Donald MacGillivray (1996), The Reluctant Emperor: A Biography of John Cantacuzene, Byzantine Emperor and Monk, c. 1295–1383, Cambridge University Press, ISBN 978-0-521-52201-4
- Soulis, George Christos (1984), The Serbs and Byzantium during the reign of Tsar Stephen Dušan (1331–1355) and his successors, Dumbarton Oaks, ISBN 978-0-88402-137-7
