= Ivanko (despot) =

Ivanko (Bulgarian: Иванко) was the ruler of the Despotate of Dobruja from 1385 to 1389, and again from 1393 to 1399. His father was Dobrotitsa.

In 1385 or 1386, Dobrotitsa died and power passed into the hands of his son, Ivanko. Ivanko severed relations with the Patriarchate of Tarnovo due to worsening relations with Emperor Ivan Shishman and the areas under his rule became subordinate to the Patriarchate of Constantinople.

To demonstrate the independence of the Despotate, Ivanko began to mint silver and bronze coins and in 1387 he signed a commercial treaty with Genoa in Pera, a colony of Genoa in Constantinople. This treaty ended the war with Genoa and provided for a Genoese trading colony in the territory of the Despotate and for the establishment of Bulgarian colony in Genoa. The text of the agreement details the rights of the Genoese, who in practice received self-government in the colony, were entitled to own land in the Despotate, and were given the opportunity to leave the Despotate with all assets in the event of a new conflict between the two countries. The treaty was signed by the Council of Elders and two representatives of the Doge of Genoa and the boyars and Costa Yolpani, messengers of Despot Ivanko, on May 27, 1387.

In 1387, the united forces of the Moravian Serbia and the Kingdom of Bosnia defeated the Ottomans in the Battle of Pločnik. Encouraged by the Christian success, Ivan Shishman immediately invalidated his vassalage to Murad I and refused to send troops in his support in 1388. Ivanko did likewise. The Ottomans reacted by sending a 30,000-strong army under the command of the grand vizier Ali Pasha, to the north of the Balkan Mountains, which invaded the Tarnovo Tzardom. After some fighting, Ivan Shishman was forced to sue for peace. The Despotate was also invaded and Varna was besieged. Ivanko was forced to accept vassalage to the Ottoman sultan.

After the majority of the Turkish troops left the Despotate, the Voevode of Wallachia, Mircea I, defeated the Turks and entered Silistra. In 1391 he reached Karnobat. He briefly took control of Dobruja from Ivanko, but in 1392, with Ottoman help, Ivanko reclaimed his lands.
