= Medieval Bulgarian navy =

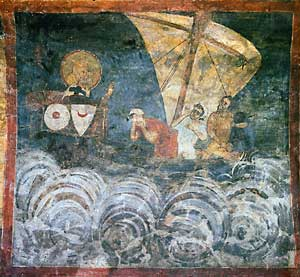
A ship depicted in a fresco in the medieval Boyana Church, Sofia

Medieval Bulgarian graffiti depicting ships, from the walls of Pliska and Preslav

During most of the Middle Ages the Bulgarians did not maintain naval forces. The first records of Bulgarians ships come from the reign of Khan Omurtag: during his war against the Franks (827-829) he came with ships from the Danube and landed troops in the rear of the Franks.

The first organised Bulgarian navy was built under Emperor Ivan Asen II (1218–1241). It was rather small and included galleys to guard the coast. The Navy's importance increased during the reign of Dobrotitsa and Ivanko in the Principality of Karvuna in the late 14th century. The Bulgarian fleet took part in successful actions against the Genoese and the Turks with its range reaching Crimea and Trebizond.

The main Bulgarian shipyard was situated in the mouth of the Kamchia river due to the abundance of wood and was burned down when the Turks overran the country.

== Military actions ==
Too little is known for the battles and quests of the Navy and the Coast Guard. In 812 Khan Krum used ships to seize several Byzantine fortresses in the Southern Black Sea Coast, most notably Nesebar. Images of these ships have been found depicted on the walls of Pliska and Preslav. In 1235 Ivan Asen II sent 25 large galleys to help the Nicean emperor in the siege of Constantinople. In the beginning of 1257 the Latin Empire hired a fleet of 10 Venetian galleys and on 14 June they captured Nessebar after a short siege but could not achieve anything more. In the late 14th century Dobrotitsa used the Navy to put his cousin on the Trebizond throne and later lead a war against Genoa which lasted to 1387 when his son Ivanco settled a favourable peace. In 1366 Amadeus VI of Savoy lost several ships during the siege of Varna.

== Ship design ==
During the First Empire the ships designed for both sea and river sailing. They had small draught and good maritime qualities. The ships had very high bows and sterns, 10-15 paddles on each board and one mast. The battle ships had a battering ram in their front.

During the Second Empire the shipbuilding traditions were continued and sophisticated. Many of the new ships had no paddles and this new type was a specific Bulgarian design: it combined features from Mediterranean (triangular sails) and North Sea ships (helm was used instead of stern paddles for better navigation). The ships were 25–30 meters long and 6–7 meters wide and had one or two masts.
