= Dobrotitsa =

Despot of Karvuna from 1354 to 1386

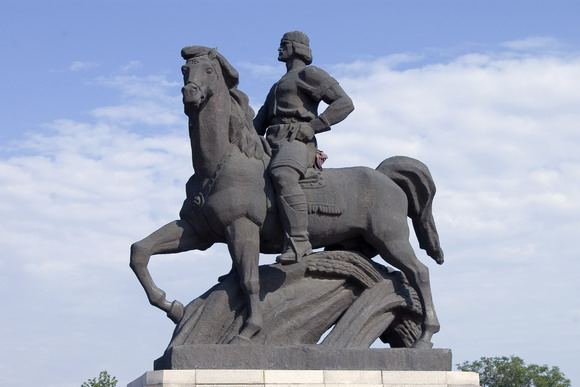
- Monument to Dobrotitsa in Dobrich (Bulgaria).

Despot of Dobruja
- Reign: 1347 - 1386
- Predecessor: Balik
- Successor: Ivanko
- Born: 14th century
- Died: 1386
- Issue: Ivanko

Dobrotitsa (Bulgarian: Добротица, pronounced [doˈbrɔtit͡sɐ]; Romanian: Dobrotici or Dobrotiță; Τομπροτίτζας in contemporaneous Byzantine documents; Dobrodicie in contemporaneous Genoese documents) was a Bulgarian noble, ruler of the de facto independent Principality of Karvuna and the Kaliakra fortress from 1354 to 1379–1386.

Dobrotitsa's ethnic origin is disputed, in consequence he is considered by some a Bulgarian noble kindred of the Terter dynasty (from the Cuman Terteroba clan), to others a Vlach, and to others a Christianised Turk. Venetian sources from the late 14th century refer to Dobrotitsa as a "despot of Bulgarians" (DESPOTUM BULGARORUM DOBROTICAM) and to his realm as "parts of Zagore (Bulgaria) subordinate to Dobrotitsa" (PARTES ZAGORAE SUBDITAS DOBROTICAE).

In 1346, Dobrotitsa and his brother Theodore were sent along with 1,000 soldiers by the Dobrujan ruler Balik (who may have been the third and eldest brother) to help the Byzantine Empress Anna of Savoy in the civil war against John VI Kantakouzenos, but were defeated by George Phakrases. The following year, after the death of Balik, he became the ruler of Dobruja. In 1348 Dobrotitsa took over the fortress of Midia and by 1356 managed to seize Kozyak (present-day Obzor) and Emona from the Byzantines.

In 1366 Emperor Ivan Alexander refused to allow the Byzantine emperor John V Palaiologos, who was returning home from Hungary, passage through Bulgaria. In order to force the Bulgarians, a relative of John V, Count Amadeus VI of Savoy, then leading his own the Savoyard crusade, attacked the Bulgarian coastal towns. In the fall of the same year Amadeo's navy captured Anchialos, Mesembria, Emona and on 25 October he besieged the strong fortress Varna, where he was repulsed. As a result, Ivan Alexander gave the Byzantines safe conduct across Bulgaria and they kept the conquered towns. In 1369 Dobrotitsa and Vladislav I of Wallachia helped Ivan Alexander to defeat the Hungarians and retake Vidin. Out of gratitude, the Emperor gave Dobrotitsa Emona and Kozyak. Later he built a navy in Varna which was engaged in actions as far as Trebizond. The Genoese manuscripts write that his navy was very strong albeit rather small and achieved successes against the Ottomans and Genoese. He was succeeded by his son Ivanko in 1386.

The names of the region of Dobruja derives from the Turkish rendition of his name. The city of Dobrich and two villages in northern Bulgaria are also named after him.

== Sources ==
- Васил Н. Златарски, История на българската държава през средните векове, Част I, II изд., Наука и изкуство, София 1970.
