= Gigliato =

Silver coin

The gigliato, also gillat or carlino, was a coin of pure silver established in 1303 by Charles II of Anjou in Naples, and then also in Provence from 1330. Its name derives from the Lilies ("giglio") depicted on the reverse entwined around a cross. The coin weighed 4 grams. This type of coin was widely copied in the Eastern Mediterranean, especially by the Turks, such as the Emir of Saruhan.

== Background ==
Charles I of Anjou, the younger brother of Louis IX of France, left his son the Kingdom of Naples and a coinage system with both gold coins and groschen size silver coins. Charles II of Anjou initially continued this coinage, but he took office in a period of financial difficulty throughout Europe and circumstances forced him to replace it. Changes in the relative market prices of gold and silver, widespread counterfeiting and clipping (i.e. shaving metal from the edge of precious metal coins), and prevalent rumors that the mint was debasing the coinage prevented his silver coins from circulating. Attempts to fix the problem with legislation in 1293, 1298 and 1301 only made matters worse. Seeing his coins exported, Charles II of Anjou made a complete change in 1303. He stopped minting gold coins entirely, and replaced his father's silver saluto d’argento with a heavier silver coin officially called a carlino but widely known as a gigliato.

== Gigliati in Naples ==
Charles II of Anjou's silver gigliato was the same diameter as the dominant silver coin of its time, the French gros tournois, or as the grosso rinforzato being struck by the Roman Senate, i.e. 24 m.m.. It contained 4.01 grams of .929 fine silver, or 3.73 grams of pure silver. Its types were more typical of French gold coins, especially Philip the Fair's petit royal d’or, than Italian silver coins.

The obverse shows the king in majestatum, i.e. seated on his throne. In this case the throne had lions on either side and the king holds a scepter and an orb topped with a cross. The legend, KAROL SCD DEI GRA IERL ET SICIL REX, i.e. Charles the second king of Jerusalem and Sicily, requires a bit of explaining. Charles I expanded his empire in to the Balkans and purchased a claim to the Kingdom of Jerusalem in 1277, even though Christians had not ruled that city since the Sultan Saladin drove them out in 1187. By 1303, the last remnant of the Kingdom of Jerusalem, Acre, was lost too, but the title was still prestigious. Moreover, the island of Sicily, which Charles I of Anjou had conquered in 1266, had been lost in a 1282 revolt called the Sicilian Vespers. Charles II of Anjou himself was captured in the ensuing war and had renounced his claims to Sicily as a condition of his release in 1288. His ally the pope immediately released him from this promise, and the 1302 Peace of Caltabellotta justified his use of the title King of Sicily for what is now more accurately called Naples, so the coin legend was appropriate.

The reverse shows a cross with fleur-de-lis on the ends of its arms and more fleur-de-lis in its angles. This profusion of lilies gave the coin its nickname, gigliato, after the Provençal name for them, gillat. The legend, HONOR REGIS IVDICIVM DILIGIT, i.e. the honor of the king loves judgment, is from Psalm 99.4 and was appropriate to the pious Charles II. The same legend was used again much later on coins of James VI of Scotland.

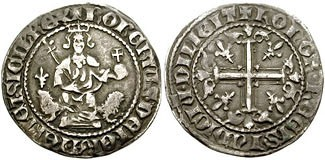
Silver gigliato of Robert the Wise

Charles II of Anjou's third son and successor, Robert the Wise became a leader of the Guelph, i.e. pro-papal, party in Italy. He paid for his campaigns against the Ghibelline, i.e. pro-imperial, party by minting vast numbers of gigliati. In the reign of Ladislaus the Magnanimous (1386-1414), however, a shortage of silver throughout Western Europe forced him to downscale his coinage to half and quarter gigliati with the same designs.

The gigliati was such a success that it outlasted the Angevin dynasty. After the revolt of 1285 separated them for Naples, Sicily had adopted its own coin denominations and used them for anti-Angevin propaganda. When Alfonso V of Aragon reunited Naples and Sicily in 1442, he adopted the gigliato of his now conquered arch-enemy. If this amounted to admitting that the Neapolitans had created a superior coinage, a change in the reverse design left no doubt which side had prevailed. All the fleur-de-lis which gave the coin its nickname, and which were the symbol of France, gave way to a coat-of-arms which, in the well understood heraldic symbolism of the day, showed that Aragon had taken over Angevin Naples and its claim to Jerusalem.

== Spread of the Gigliato ==
The marriage of Charles I of Anjou and the countess of Provence in 1246 had given his dynasty control of that French region. In 1330, Robert the Wise began striking gigliati there. At the time, Provence hosted the Avignon Papacy and Pope John XXII began striking a version of the gigliato at Avignon. The pope was still seated on a lion throne, but now wearing a mitre and holding a cross. The cross on the reverse still had fleur-de-les on its arms but none in its angles. Pope Clement VI replaced the cross in the reverse with the crossed keys insignia of the papacy and Pope Urban V moved both the papacy and these coins to Rome. They became such an important part of papal coinage that even the Antipope John XXIII struck them.

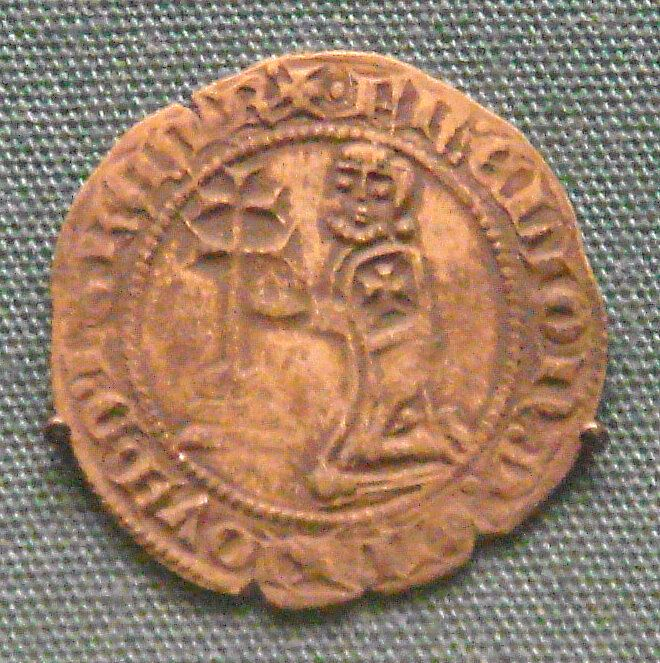
Silver gigliato of Hélion de Villeneuve, Grand Master of the Knights of Rhodes, 1319–1346.

Other mints in Provence, especially those along the Rhône river imitated the gigliato but one native of Provence took them farther afield. Hélion de Villeneuve became grand master of the Knights Hospitaller and found that its Greek influenced coinage did not facilitate trade. He replaced it with coins having the weight standard of the gigliato, and a reverse type clearly derived from it, but with an obverse based on the seal of his order. Although Neapolitan gigliati were more common in the eastern Mediterranean, it appears that he copied the issues from Provence.

The marriage of Charles II of Anjou to the daughter of Stephen V of Hungary gave his grandson Charles Robert a claim that country and he became king in 1308. He started striking large silver coins there, copying the obverse type of the giglatio but using the reverse for heraldry which symbolized his descent from both Stephen V of Hungary and Charles II of Anjou.

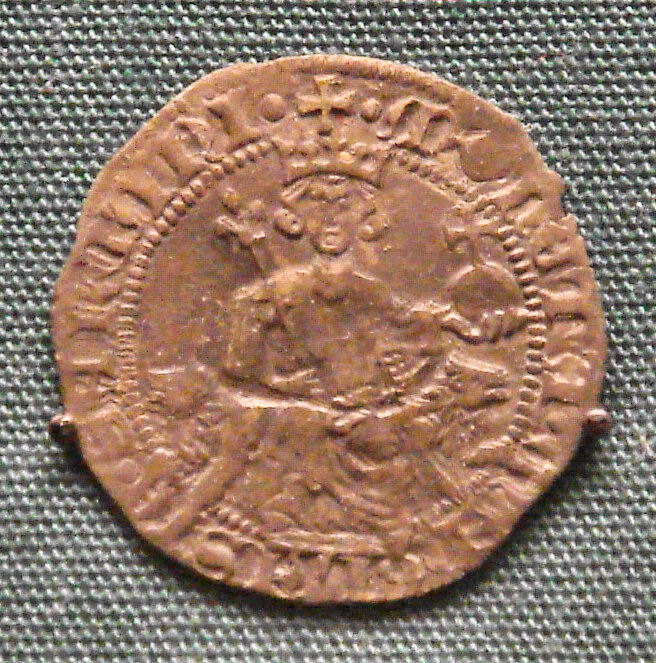
Silver gigliato of Sarukhan, Bey of Magnesia, 1313–1348, ruler of Lydia, western Turkey.

Expansion of the Angevin Empire was not the only factor in the spread of the gigliato. The bankers who administered their Neapolitan mints also did business in the Levant and hoards show that many gigliati made their way there. And gigliati were imitated in the eastern Mediterranean too. Some imitations such as the one shown are clearly intended to be mistaken for the originals. Others, like the ones struck at Chios used distinctive designs.

== See also ==
- History of coins in Italy
