= Sarukhan Bey =

Turkish Bey of Magnesia

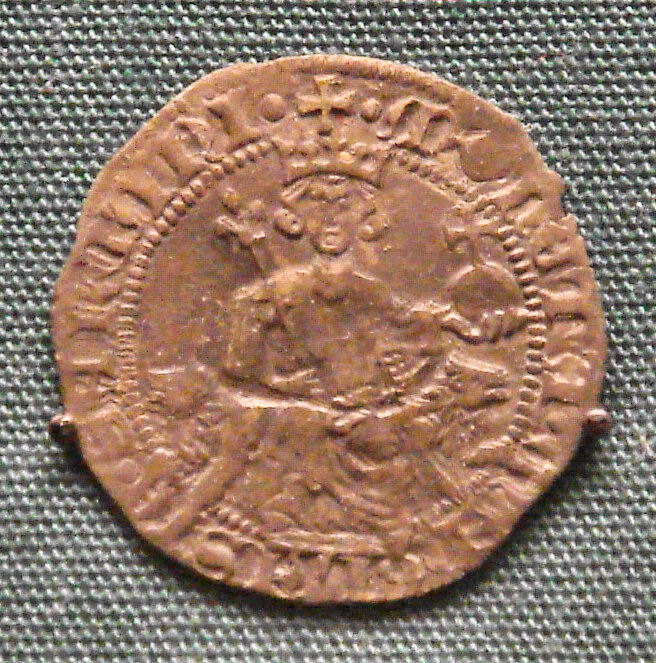
Silver gigliato of Sarukhan Beg bin Alpagi, 1313-1348, ruler of Lydia, western Turkey. This is an imitation of a coin of Robert I of Anjou, king of Naples (1309-1343).

Sarukhan (1300/01–1345/46) was a Turkish Bey of Magnesia (present-day Manisa, Turkey).

Sarukhan was a Turkish Bey who is remembered for his conquests in the western Anatolian Peninsula. In 1313, he occupied Thyatira (present-day Akhisar, Manisa Province), and then left his name "Saruhan" to the region he had occupied, becoming an independent ruler and transmitting the region to his descendants.

At one point in 1336, Sarukhan formed an alliance with the Byzantine Emperor Andronikos III Palaiologos, and supported him militarily in two sieges against the Genoese, in Mytilene and Phocaea. In 1341 however he attacked Constantinople with a fleet, but was repulsed around the Gallipoli peninsula by a Byzantine fleet.
