= Balik (ruler) =

Balik (Bulgarian: Балик, Byzantine Greek: Μπαλίκας: fl. c. 1320 and died 1347) was a noble of the Second Bulgarian Empire who increased the autonomy of his province and became despot of the Principality of Karvuna. He broke away from the empire in the 1340s and, as a result, the dioceses in his region, which was later named Dobrudja, were subsumed under the jurisdiction of the Patriarchate of Constantinople. This came after Tsar Ivan Alexander divided Bulgaria into three territories that were held by his sons.

V. Stoyanov explains the name through Turkic balik - 'city', or balïk - 'fish'. But another Turkic etymology can also be indicated. balq – 'shines, sparkles, shines', balqï, Turkish dial. balqïn – 'beautiful, shining', balqïr – 'lightning', or with Turk. Chagatai balga, Kalmyk balig – 'mace'.

During the Byzantine civil war of 1341–1347 he supported the regent Anna of Savoy against pretender John VI Kantakouzenos. Balik died in 1347, either during an outbreak of the Black Death or killed during a retaliation campaign led by Umur Beg, on behalf of John V Palaiologos, that destroyed Dobruja's seaports. In 1359, Balik's brother Dobrotitsa was appointed head of a new province created by the Anna of Savoy as his reward for helping her gain the Byzantine throne. He succeeded Balik after he recaptured Karvuna (Balchik) in 1354.
