= Despotate of Dobruja =

14th century quasi-independent polity

Despotate of Dobruja Добруджанско Деспотство (Bulgarian) Dobrudzhansko Despotstvo (Bulgarian)
- 1356–1411
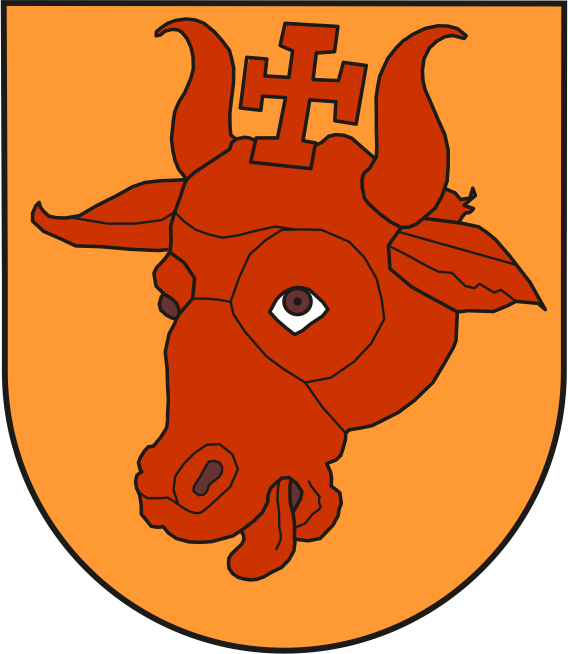
- Flag around 1350 mentioned by Spanish Franciscan friar probably belongs to Dobruja (Note: Flag of Vicina, Dobruja, around 1350, according to the story of a Spanish Franciscan friar: "I left Constantinople and entered the Mare Mayor (Black Sea), proceeding along the coast of the left hand to a great city called Vecina (Vicina¹). Here nine rivers unite and fall into the Mare Mayor². These nine rivers make a great commotion before this city of Vecina, which is the capital of the kingdom³. It has a white flag with four red squares." ¹ - In National Geographic Vecina is confounded with Vidin, although the latter is far away from the Black Sea, and has nothing to do with the Danube Delta. ² - The Danube Delta. ³ - Possible reference to principality of Dobrotici of Dobruja.) Coat of arms of Terter dynasty (ruling despots)

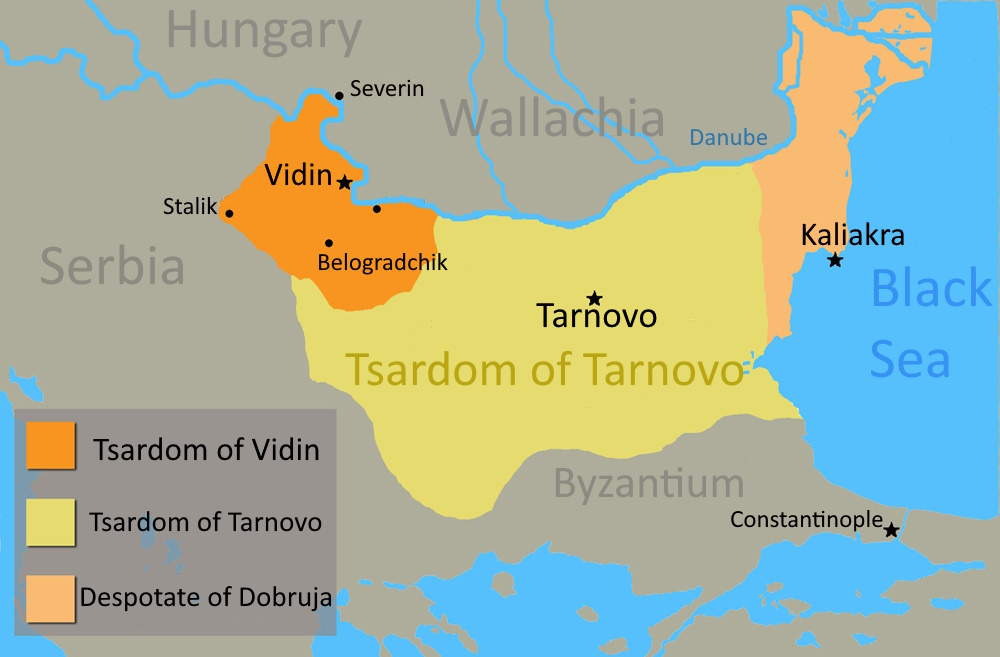
- The successors of the Second Bulgarian Empire after the death of Ivan Alexander
- Status: Principality; Despotate
- Capital: Karvuna (Balchik)
- Common languages: Middle Bulgarian, Romanian
- Religion: Eastern Orthodox
- Government: Hereditary monarchy
- Despot / Prince
  - 1340s-1347: Balik
  - 1356-1386: Dobrotitsa
  - 1385-1389, 1393-1399: Ivanko
- Historical era: Late Middle Ages
  - Established: 1340s
  - Conquest and incorporation into the Ottoman Empire: 1411
Preceded by	Succeeded by
Second Bulgarian Empire	Ottoman Empire
- Today part of: Bulgaria; Romania; Ukraine

The Despotate of Dobruja or Principality of Karvuna (Bulgarian: Добруджанско деспотство or Карвунско княжество; Romanian: Despotatul Dobrogei or Țara Cărvunei) was a 14th-century quasi-independent Bulgarian polity in the region of modern Dobruja, that split off from the Second Bulgarian Empire under the influence of the Byzantine Empire. The Despotate of Dobruja existed from 1356 to 1411.

The principality's name is derived from the fortress of Karvuna (present-day Balchik, not to be confused with Karnava/Kavarna), mentioned in Bulgarian and Byzantine documents and Italian portolans of the 14th century as its first capital, and located between Varna and Cape Kaliakra.

== History ==
The principality was spun off from the Second Bulgarian Empire (followed by other frontier regions of Bulgaria such as Vidin and Velbuzhd) in the 1340s under Balik (member of the Bulgarian-Cuman dynasty of Terter according to some authors) and placed itself ecclesiastically under the Patriarchate of Constantinople. A "Metropolitan of Varna and Dobrich" was mentioned in 1325. Under Balik's son Dobrotitsa (1347–1386; ruling with the title of "despot" after 1357) the principality came to its greatest power and extension and the capital was moved to Kaliakra.

In 1346 or 1347, the principality was plagued by the Black Death, transmitted by Genoese boats from Caffa before they finally brought it to Sicily, Genoa and the whole of Western Europe. The principality had its own navy, which also engaged in piracy forcing the Genoese to complain, and possibly took part in an operation off Trebizond. In 1453, the Ottoman navy at the siege of Constantinople was initially led by one admiral Baltoglu, a Bulgarian convert from the former principality.

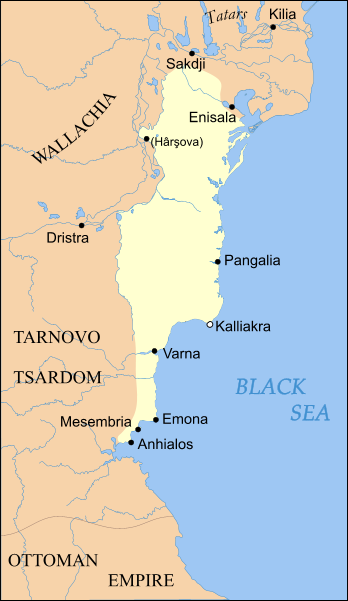
The Principality of Karvuna at its greatest territorial extent, during the reign of Dobrotitsa

In 1366, Ivan Alexander refused to give conduct to the John V Palaiologos who was returning home from Hungary. To force the Bulgarians to comply, John V ordered his relative Count Amadeus VI of Savoy to attack the Bulgarian coastal towns. In the autumn of the same year, Amadeus' navy took Pomorie, Nessebar, Emona, and Kozyak, and on 25 October besieged the strong fortress of Varna, where it was repulsed. As a result, Ivan Alexander gave the Byzantines safe conduct across Bulgaria and they kept the conquered Nessebar; Varna, Emona, and Kozyak were ceded to Dobrotitsa for his help against Amadeus.

As a traditional breadbasket, Dobruja supplied wheat to Constantinople mostly via the major ports of Varna and Kaliakra frequented by the Genoese and Venetian fleets. The republics held their consulates at Varna and kept trading colonies at Castritsi and Galata outside that city.

Between 1370 and 1375, allied with Venice, Dobrotitsa challenged Genoese power in the Black Sea. In 1373, he tried to impose his son-in-law, Michael, as Emperor of Trebizond, but achieved no success. Dobrotitsa supported John V Palaiologos against his son Andronikos IV Palaiologos. In 1379, the Bulgarian fleet participated in the blockade of Constantinople, fighting with the Genoese fleet. Venetian sources from the late 14th century refer to Dobrotitsa as a "despot of the Bulgarians" (DESPOTUM BULGARORUM DOBROTICAM) and to his realm as "parts of Zagora (Bulgaria) subordinate to Dobrotitsa" (PARTES ZAGORAE (BULGARIAE) SUBDITAS DOBROTICAE).

In 1386, Dobrotitsa died and was succeeded by Ivanko, who in the same year made peace with Murad I, moved his capital from Kaliakra to Varna, and in 1387 signed a commercial treaty with Genoa at Pera. This same year, Ivan Shishman attacked him, defeating and killing his former vassal Dan I of Wallachia, an ally of Ivanko's, but didn't manage to bring Dobruja back under his rule. Varna fell to the Ottomans in 1389, Ivanko himself dying in battle in 1388. From 1406 to 1411, most of Dobruja, with Drastar fortress (modern Silistra), was put under the rule of Mircea cel Bătrân of Wallachia. In 1411, the Ottoman Turks invaded and incorporated Dobruja into the Ottoman Empire. In 1413, Varna was turned over to Manuel II Palaiologos. In 1414, the area was devastated by Tatars. In 1444 the Ottomans secured it after the Battle of Varna.

At the very end of the 14th century, German traveller Johann Schiltberger described the lands of the former Bulgarian Empire as follows:

I was in three regions, and all three were called Bulgaria. The first Bulgaria extends there, where you pass from Hungary through the Iron Gate. Its capital is called Vidin. The other Bulgaria lies opposite Wallachia, and its capital is called Tarnovo. The third Bulgaria is there, where the Danube flows into the sea. Its capital is called Kaliakra.

However, today, some Gagauz people and Turkish scholars claim the Despotate of Dobruja, or as how they call it, the "Uzi Eyalet" or "Uzi State" (Romanian: Uziăilet; Turkish: Uzi Eyaleti or Uz Eyaleti), was the first Gagauz state in history.

== Rulers of the Despotate of Dobruja ==
Unknown	Unknown
Balik (around 1320–47)	Theodore	Dobrotitsa (1347–85)	Unknown*
Ivanko (1385–95)	Terter	Unknown daughter	Michael Palaiologos**

Notes:
* Daughter of Alexios Apokaukos, Byzantine military commander
** Son of Michael Palaiologos, Despot of Zagora

== See also ==
- History of Bulgaria
- Medieval Bulgarian Navy
- Varna
- Balchik
- Cape Kaliakra
