= Ottoman wars in Europe =

Series of military conflicts between the Ottoman Empire and various European states

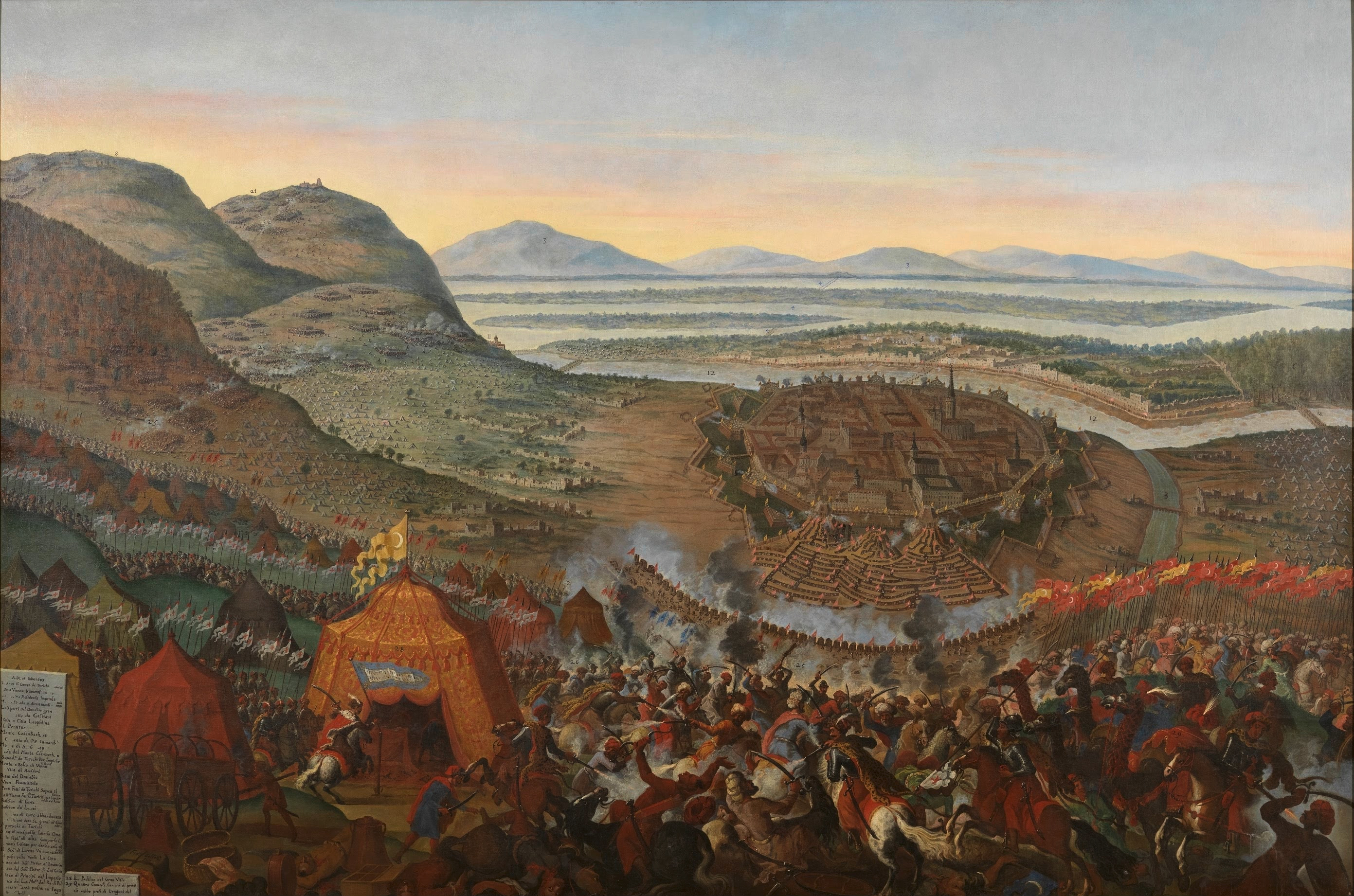
The relief of Vienna by Frans Geffels

A series of military conflicts between the Ottoman Empire and various European states took place from the Late Middle Ages up through the early 20th century. The earliest conflicts began during the Byzantine–Ottoman wars, waged in Anatolia in the late 13th century before entering Europe in the mid-14th century with the Bulgarian–Ottoman wars. The mid-15th century saw the Serbian–Ottoman wars and the Albanian-Ottoman wars. Much of this period was characterized by the Ottoman expansion into the Balkans. The Ottoman Empire made further inroads into Central Europe in the 15th and 16th centuries, culminating in the peak of Ottoman territorial claims in Europe.

The Ottoman–Venetian wars spanned four centuries, starting in 1423 and lasting until 1718. This period witnessed the fall of Negroponte in 1470, the siege of Malta in 1565, the fall of Famagusta (Cyprus) in 1571, the defeat of the Ottoman fleet at the Battle of Lepanto in 1571 (at that time the largest naval battle in history), the fall of Candia (Crete) in 1669, the Venetian reconquest of Morea (Peloponnese) in the 1680s and its loss again in 1715. The island of Venetian-ruled Corfu remained the only Greek island not conquered by the Ottomans.

In the late seventeenth century, European powers began to consolidate against the Ottomans and formed the Holy League, reversing a number of Ottoman land gains during the Great Turkish War of 1683–99. Nevertheless, Ottoman armies were able to hold their own against their European rivals until the second half of the eighteenth century. (Note: The Ottomans were able largely to maintain military parity until taken by surprise both on land and at sea in the Russian war from 1768 to 1774.)

In the nineteenth century the Ottomans were confronted with insurrection from their Serbian (1804–1817), Greek (1821–1832) and Romanian (1877–1878) subjects. This occurred in tandem with the Russo-Turkish wars, which further destabilized the empire. The final retreat of Ottoman rule began with the First Balkan War (1912–1913), and culminated in the signing of the Treaty of Sèvres after World War I, leading to the partitioning of the Ottoman Empire. The last of the Ottoman conflicts took place in 1923, where the empire reclaimed occupied lands in Anatolia from the Greeks, Armenians, French, and Italians. Istanbul, occupied by the combined Entente forces, was also recaptured.

== History ==
=== Rise of the Ottomans (1299–1453) ===
==== Byzantine Empire ====
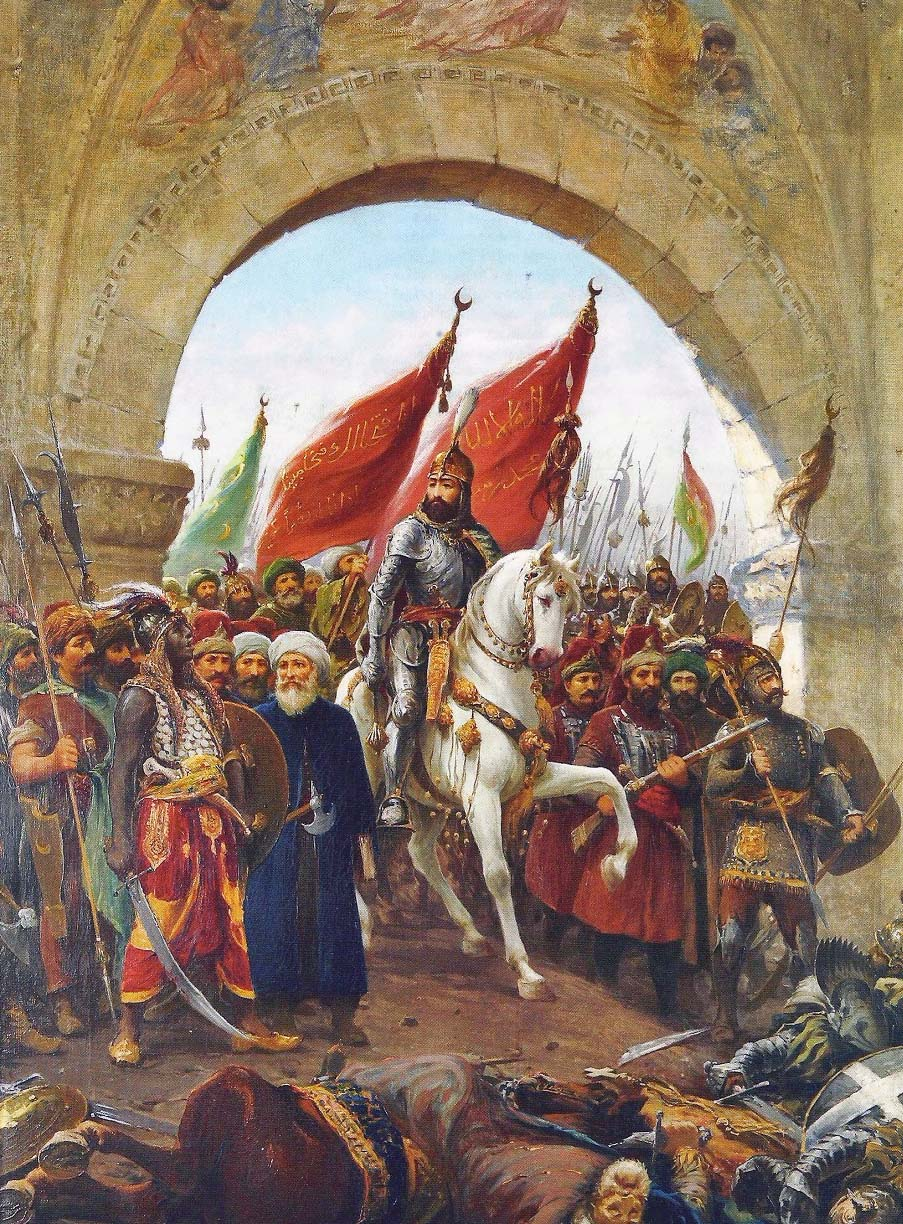
Conquest of Constantinople by Sultan Mehmed the Conqueror in 1453

Ottoman Emirate entered Europe amidst destructive civil war between John V Palaiologos and John VI Kantakouzenos and his son, Matthew Kantakouzenos. Ottomans were initially deployed as mercenaries allied with John VI and plundered Byzantine Thrace. They were granted the small fortress of Tzympe near Gallipoli. On 2 March 1354, the area was struck by an earthquake that destroyed hundreds of villages and towns in the area. Nearly every building in Gallipoli was destroyed, causing the Greek inhabitants to evacuate the city. Within a month, Süleyman Pasha seized the site, quickly fortifying it and populating it with Turkish families brought over from Anatolia.

Fall of Gallipoli in 1354 (or in 1356 – disputable due to a change in the Byzantine calendar), provided Ottomans with basis for operations in Europe, and thus started their westward expansion into the European continent. In 1361 Didymoteichon fell to the Turks. Orhan's successor, Murad I was more concerned with his Anatolian positions. However, Murad left the taking of Byzantine territory to his vassals with Philippopolis falling after major campaigning between 1363–64 and Adrianople succumbing to the Ottomans in 1369. Ottoman territory in Europe would thereafter known as Rumelia.

Ottoman advances into the Balkans were aided by further Byzantine civil conflict – this time between John V and his eldest son Andronikos IV. Thessalonica capitulated after four-year siege in 1387. Murad I fell on the plains of Kosovo and John V died a year later. Both were succeeded by Bayezid I and Manuel II respectively.

In 1394, Emperor Manuel II not only refused Bayezid I demands, he also refused to pay the Sultan tribute and went so far as to ignore the Sultan's messages, leading to a siege of the city in 1394. The siege was finally broken when Timur of the Timurid Empire led an army into Anatolia, dismantling the network of beyliks loyal to the Ottoman Sultan. At the Battle of Ankara, Timur's forces routed Ottoman forces and captured Bayezid I himself, a shocking defeat for which no one was prepared. In the aftermath, the Ottoman Turks began fighting each other led by Bayezid's sons. The Byzantines wasted no time exploiting the situation and signed a peace treaty with their Christian neighbours and with one of Bayezid's sons by which they were able to recover Thessalonika and much of the Peloponnese. The civil war would only end in 1413 when Mehmed I emerged as victor.

Murad II succeeded Mehmed while John VIII ascended to the Byzantine throne in 1421. This led to a deteriorated change in relations between the two as neither leader was content with the status quo. John VIII made the first and foolish move by inciting a rebellion in the Ottoman Empire: a certain Mustafa had been released by the Byzantines and claimed that he was Bayezid's lost son. Murad II's furious reply eventually smashed this upstart and, in 1422, began the Siege of Thessalonika that lasted for eight years before eventual Ottoman victory, and of the Constantinople itself. John VIII then turned to his aging father, Manuel II, for advice. The result was that he incited yet another rebellion in the Ottoman ranks — this time supporting Murad II brother's claim, Kucuk Mustafa. The seemingly promising rebellion had its origins in Asia Minor with Bursa coming under siege. After a failed assault on Constantinople, Murad II was forced to turn back his army and defeat Kucuk. With these defeats, the Byzantines were forced once more into vassalage – 300,000 coins of silver were to be delivered to the Sultan as tribute on an annual basis.

John VIII died in 1448 while Murad II died in 1451. Both were succeeded by Constantine XI and Mehmed II respectively. Constantine then proceeded to ask for a raise of Ottoman subsidy over Orhan Çelebi, grandson of Bayezid I and threaten his release to spark another civil war in the Ottoman Empire if refused. Mehmed used this as pretext to besiege Constantinople which fell on 29 May 1453, ending the Roman Empire. The remaining Roman remnant states (Despotate of the Morea and Empire of Trebizond) fell in 1460 and 1461 respectively. Conquered European portion of Byzantine Empire, along with others was consolidated particularly into Beylerbeyli of Rumelia

==== Bulgarian Empire ====
In the latter half of the 14th century, the Ottoman Empire proceeded to advance north and west in the Balkans, completely subordinating Thrace and much of Macedonia after the Battle of Maritsa in 1371. Sofia fell in 1382, followed by the capital of the Second Bulgarian Empire Tarnovgrad in 1393, and the northwest remnants of the state after the Battle of Nicopolis in 1396.

==== Serbian Empire ====
A significant opponent of the Ottomans, the young Serbian Empire, was worn down by a series of campaigns, notably in the Battle of Kosovo in 1389, in which the leaders of both armies were killed, and which gained a central role in Serbian folklore as an epic battle and as the beginning of the end for medieval Serbia. Much of Serbia fell to the Ottomans by 1459, the Kingdom of Hungary made a partial reconquest in 1480, but it fell again by 1499. Territories of the Serbian Empire were divided between the Ottoman Empire, the Republic of Venice and the Kingdom of Hungary, with remaining territories being in some sort of a vassal status towards Hungary, until its own conquest.

==== Crusades against the Ottoman Empire ====
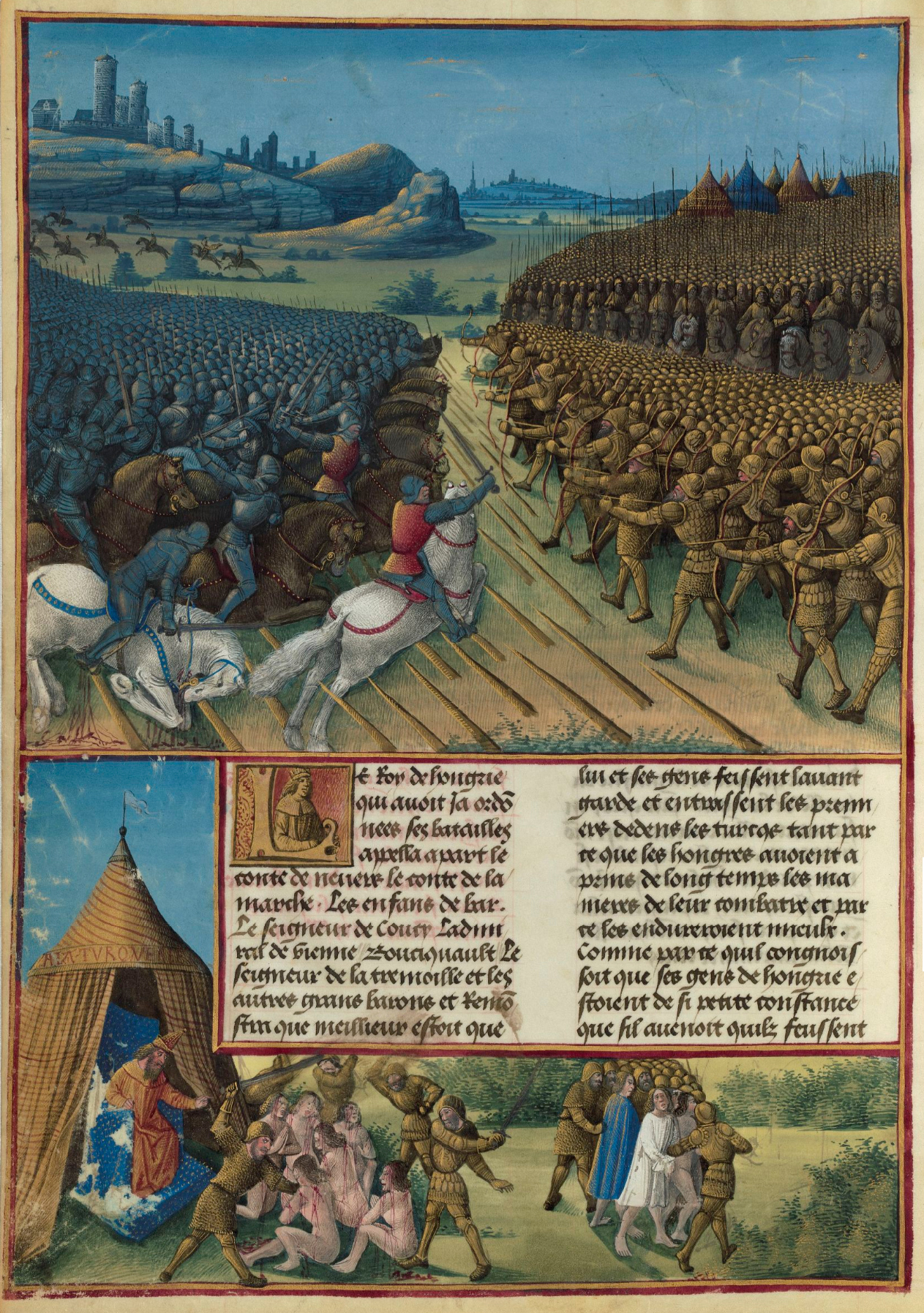
1475 miniature of the Battle of Nicopolis by Jean Colombe called Les Passages d'Outremer, BnF Fr 5594

Pope Urban V initiated the Savoyard Crusade led by Count Amadeus VI of Savoy in 1366. Although intended as a collaboration with the Kingdom of Hungary and the Byzantine Empire against the growing Ottoman Empire in eastern Europe, the crusade was diverted from its main purpose to attack the Second Bulgarian Empire instead. There the crusaders made small gains that they handed over to the Byzantines. It did take back some territory from the Ottomans in the vicinity of Constantinople and on Gallipoli but all these conquests were reversed within less than five years by the Turks, when Andronikos IV returned it to the Turks for their support against his father, John V in the civil war.

The first revival of activity was a 1390 Genoese plan to seize the Tunisian port of Al-Mahdiya. Both the Roman and Avignon popes awarded indulgences and the French king's uncle, Louis II, Duke of Bourbon, was the leader. There is little evidence of cross taking, and the exercise was more of a chivalric promenade by a small force. After a disease-ridden, nine-week siege, the Tunis crusade agreed to withdraw. After their victory at the Battle of Kosovo in 1389, the Ottomans had conquered most of the Balkans and had reduced Byzantine influence to the area immediately surrounding Constantinople, which they later besieged. In 1393, the Bulgarian Tsar Ivan Shishman lost Nicopolis to the Ottomans. In 1394, Pope Boniface IX proclaimed a new Crusade against the Turks, although the Western Schism had split the papacy. Sigismund of Luxemburg, King of Hungary, led this Crusade which involved several French nobles including John the Fearless, the son of the Duke of Burgundy, who became the Crusade's military leader. Sigismund advised the Crusaders to focus on defence when they reached the Danube, but they besieged the city of Nicopolis. The Ottomans defeated them in the Battle of Nicopolis on 25 September, capturing 3,000 prisoners.

As the Ottomans pressed westward, Sultan Murad II destroyed the last Papal-funded Crusade at Varna on the Black Sea in 1444 and four years later crushed the last Hungarian expedition. John Hunyadi and Giovanni da Capistrano organised a 1456 Crusade to lift the Siege of Belgrade. Æneas Sylvius and John of Capistrano preached the Crusade, the princes of the Holy Roman Empire in the Diets of Ratisbon and Frankfurt promised assistance, and a league was formed between Venice, Florence and Milan, but nothing came of it. Venice was the only polity to continue to pose a significant threat to the Ottomans in the Mediterranean, but it pursued the "Crusade" mostly for its commercial interests, leading to the protracted Ottoman–Venetian Wars, which continued, with interruptions, until 1718. The end of the Crusades, in at least a nominal effort of Catholic Europe against Muslim incursion, came in the 16th century, when the Franco-Imperial wars assumed continental proportions. Francis I of France sought allies from all quarters, including from German Protestant princes and Muslims. Amongst these, he entered into one of the capitulations of the Ottoman Empire with Suleiman the Magnificent while making common cause with Hayreddin Barbarossa and a number of the Sultan's North African vassals.

==== Kingdom of Hungary ====
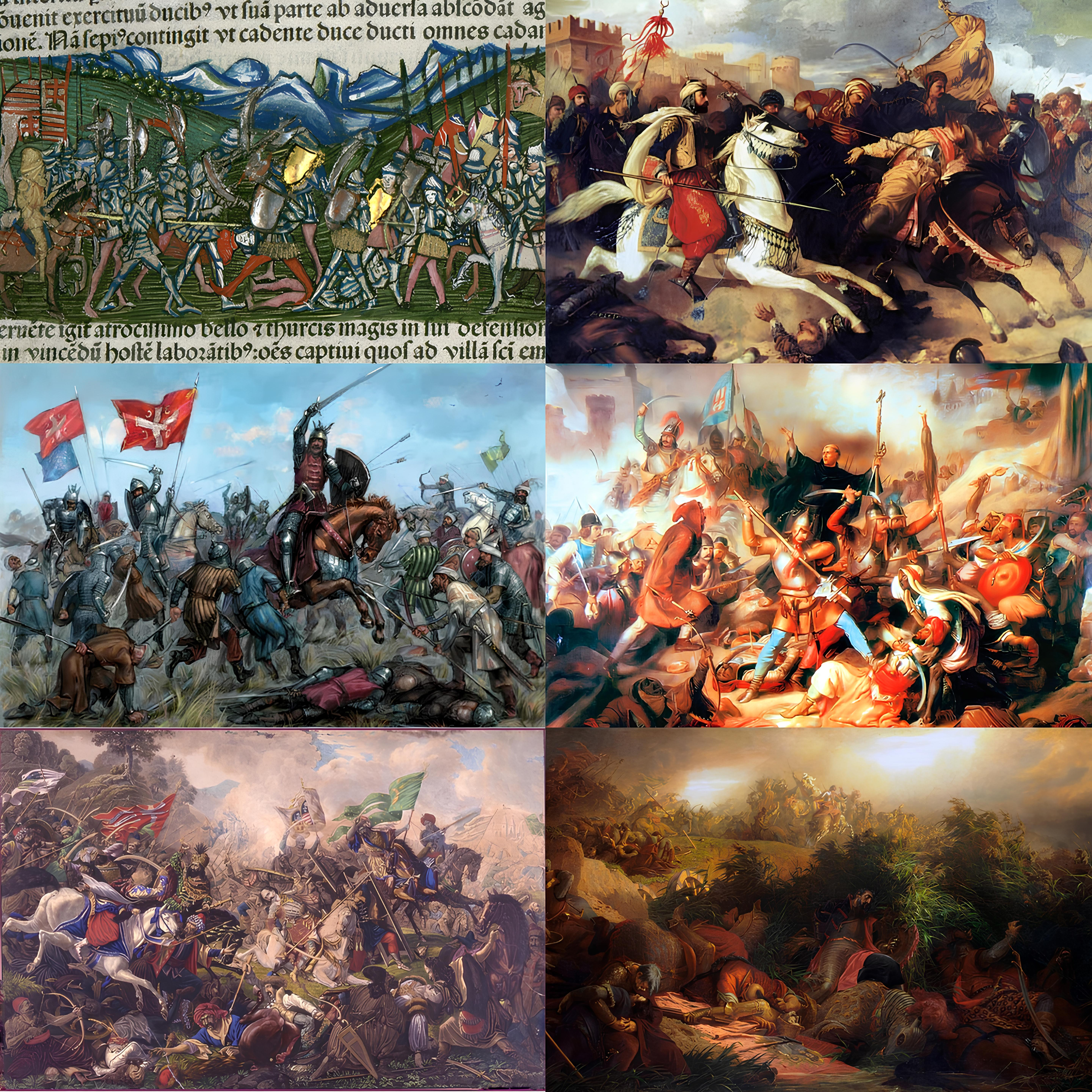
Clockwise, from top left: The Battle of Hermannstadt, The Battle of Varna, The Battle of Kosovo, The Siege of Belgrade, The Battle of Breadfield, The Battle of Mohács

Ottoman Campaigns of John Hunyadi, 1440–1456

Since the 1360s Hungary confronted with the Ottoman Empire. The Kingdom of Hungary led several crusades, campaigns and carried out several defence battles and sieges against the Ottomans. Hungary bore the brunt of the Ottoman wars in Europe during the 15th century and successfully halted the Ottoman advance.

In the year of 1442, John Hunyadi won four victories against the Ottomans, two of which were decisive. In March 1442, Hunyadi defeated Mezid Bey and the raiding Ottoman army at the Battle of Szeben in the south part of the Kingdom of Hungary in Transylvania. In September 1442, Hunyadi defeated a large Ottoman army of Beylerbey Şehabeddin, the Provincial Governor of Rumelia. This was the first time that a European army defeated such a large Ottoman force, composed not only of raiders, but of the provincial cavalry led by their own sanjak beys (governors) and accompanied by the formidable janissaries. These victories made Hunyadi a prominent enemy of the Ottomans and a renowned figure throughout Christendom and were prime motivators for him to undertake along with King Władysław the famous expedition known as the "Long Campaign" in 1443, with the Battle of Niš being the first major clash of this expedition. Hunyadi was accompanied by Giuliano Cesarini during the campaign.

The defeat in 1456 at the siege of Nándorfehérvár (Belgrade) held up Ottoman expansion into Catholic Europe for 70 years, though for one year (1480–1481) the Italian port of Otranto was taken, and in 1493 the Ottoman army successfully raided Croatia and Styria.

During the reign of King Matthias of Hungary, the standing professional mercenary army was called the Black Army of Hungary Matthias recognized the importance and key role of early firearms in the infantry, which greatly contributed to his victories. Every fourth soldier in the Black Army had an arquebus, which was an unusual ratio at the time. In the great Viennese military parade in 1485, the Black Army consisted of 20,000 horsemen and 8,000 infantry in 1485. The Black Army was larger than the army of King Louis XI of France, the only other existing permanent professional European army in the era. The Hungarian army destroyed the three times bigger attacker Ottoman and Wallachian troops at the Battle of Breadfield in Transylvania in 1479. The battle was the most significant victory for the Hungarians against the raiding Ottomans, and as a result, the Ottomans did not attack southern Hungary and Transylvania for many years thereafter. The Black Army recaptured Otranto in Italy from the Ottoman Empire in 1481.

=== Growth (1453–1683) ===
==== Wars in Albania and Italy ====
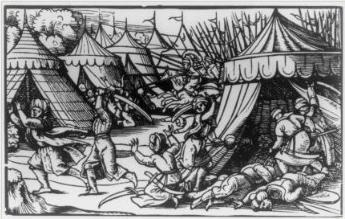
Albanian assault on a Turkish encampment in 1457

The Ottomans took much of Albania in the 1385 Battle of Savra. The 1444 League of Lezhë briefly restored one part of Albania, until Ottomans captured complete territory of Albania after capture of Shkodër in 1479 and Durrës in 1501.

The Ottomans faced resistance from Albanians who gathered around their leader, Gjergj Kastrioti Skanderbeg, son of a feudal Albanian Nobleman, Gjon Kastrioti who also fought against the Ottomans in the Albanian revolt of 1432–1436 led by Gjergj Arianiti. Skanderbeg managed to fend off Ottoman attacks for more than 25 years, culminating at the siege of Shkodra in 1478–79. During this period, many Albanian victories were achieved like the Battle of Torvioll, Battle of Otonetë, siege of Krujë, Battle of Polog, Battle of Ohrid, Battle of Mokra, Battle of Oranik 1456 and many other battles, culminating in the Battle of Albulena in 1457 where the Albanian Army under Skanderbeg won a decisive victory over the Ottomans. In 1465 Ballaban's Campaign against Skanderbeg took place. Its goal was to crush the Albanian Resistance, but it was not successful and it ended in an Albanian victory. With the death of Skanderbeg on 17 January 1468, the Albanian Resistance began to fall. After the death of Skanderbeg, the Albanian Resistance was led by Lekë Dukagjini from 1468 until 1479, but it didn't have the same success as before. Merely two years after the collapse of the Albanian resistance in 1479, Sultan Mehmet II launched an Italian campaign, which failed thanks to Christian recapture of Otranto and Sultan's death in 1481.

A map of the territorial expansion of the Ottoman Empire

==== Conquest of Bosnia ====
The Ottoman Empire first reached Bosnia in 1388 where they were defeated by Bosnian forces in the Battle of Bileća and then were forced to retreat. After the fall of Serbia in 1389 Battle of Kosovo, where the Bosnians participated through Vlatko Vuković, the Turks began various offensives against the Kingdom of Bosnia. The Bosnians defended themselves but without much success. The Bosnians resisted strongly in the Bosnian Royal castle of Jajce (the siege of Jajce), where the last Bosnian king Stjepan Tomašević tried to repel the Turks. The Ottoman army conquered Jajce after a few months in 1463 and executed the last King of Bosnia, ending Medieval Bosnia. (Note: ...in Bosnia Jajce under Hungarian garrison held until 1527.)

The House of Kosača held Herzegovina until 1482. It took another four decades for the Ottomans to defeat the Hungarian garrison at Jajce Fortress in 1527. Bihać and the westernmost areas of Bosnia were finally conquered by the Ottomans in 1592.

==== Croatia ====
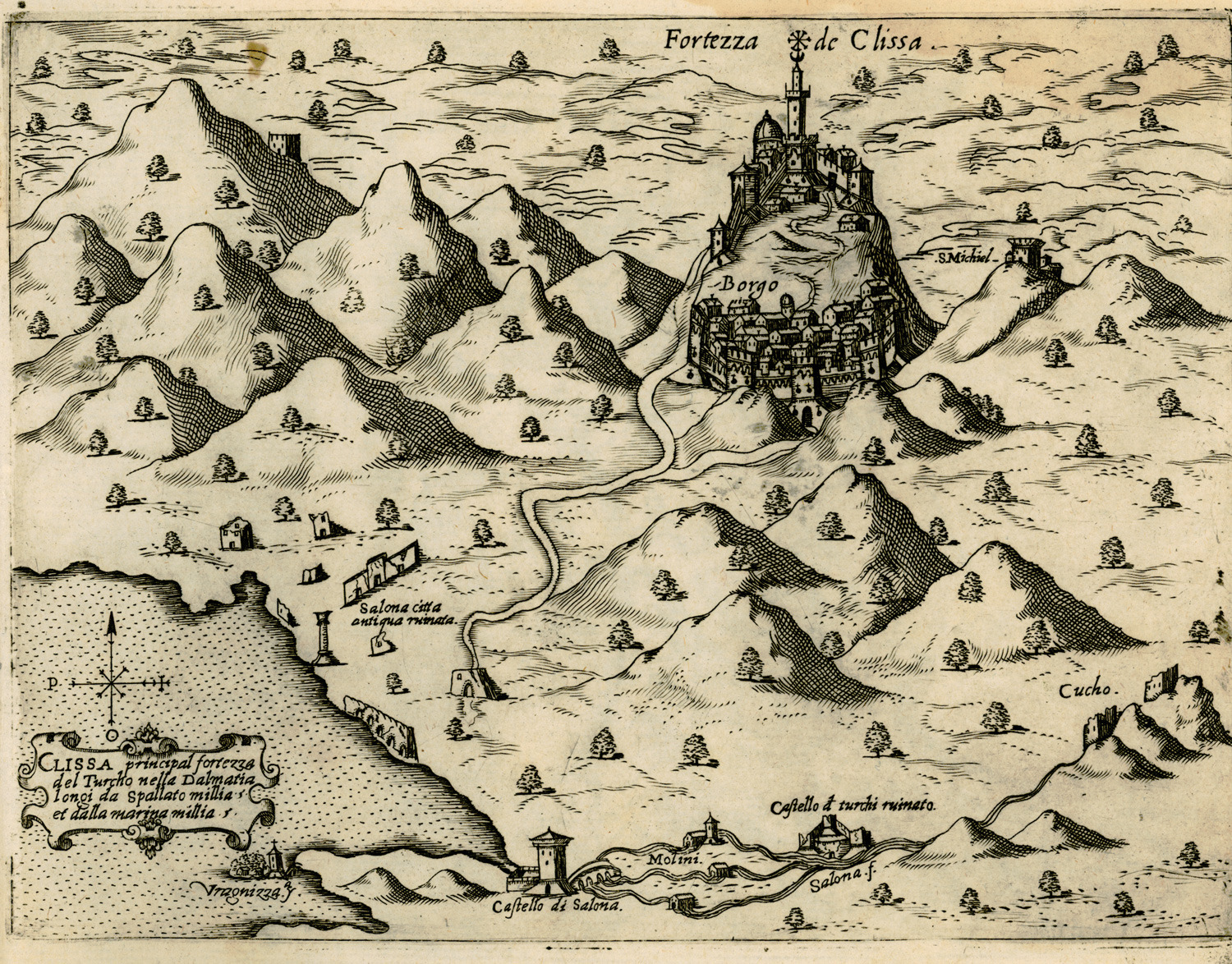
Croatian captain Petar Kružić led the defense of the Klis Fortress against a Turkish invasion and siege that lasted for more than two and a half decades. During this defense, an elite Croatian military faction of Uskoci was formed.

After the fall of the Kingdom of Bosnia into Ottoman hands in 1463, the southern and central parts of the Kingdom of Croatia remained unprotected, the defense of which was left to Croatian gentry who kept smaller troops in the fortified border areas at their own expense. The Ottomans meanwhile reached the river Neretva and, having conquered Herzegovina (Rama) in 1482, they encroached upon Croatia, skillfully avoiding the fortified border towns. A decisive Ottoman victory at the Battle of Krbava Field shook all of Croatia. However, it did not dissuade the Croats from making persistent attempts at defending themselves against the attacks of the superior Ottoman forces. After almost two hundred years of Croatian resistance against the Ottoman Empire victory in the Battle of Sisak marked the end of Ottoman rule and the Hundred Years' Croatian–Ottoman War. The Viceroy's army, chasing the fleeing remnants at Petrinja in 1595, sealed the decisive Croatian victory.

==== Habsburg lands ====
The Ottomans raided Carniola in 1469 and launched almost annual raids into Styria after 1471. In 1477, Ottoman forces led by Ömer Bey and Skender Pasha conducted a major raid into Carniola, Styria, Carinthia, and Friuli. The raiders, primarily light cavalry known as akinjis, penetrated deep into Habsburg and Venetian territory, causing widespread devastation. Carinthia saw five Turkish incursions into its territory between 1473 and 1483, with much plundering and killing at the hands of Ottoman cavalry. These raids led to the Carinthian Peasant Revolt of 1478, as peasants, left unprotected by the nobility, tried to defend themselves and formed a peasants' league to organize their own defense. The raids also prompted the construction of defensive structures like fortified churches and castles (tabor). In 1491, Ottoman raids in the Habsburg territories of Styria and Carniola ended after a significant defeat at the Battle of Vrpile.

==== Conquest of Serbia ====
As a result of heavy losses inflicted by the Ottomans in the Battle of Maritsa in 1371, the Serbian Empire had dissolved into several principalities. In the Battle of Kosovo in 1389, Serbian forces were again annihilated. Throughout the 15th and 16th centuries, constant struggles took place between various Serbian kingdoms and the Ottoman Empire. The turning point was the fall of Constantinople to the Turks. In 1459, following the siege, the temporary Serbian capital of Smederevo fell. Zeta was overrun by 1499. Belgrade was the last major Balkan city to endure Ottoman forces. Serbs, Hungarians, and European crusaders defeated the Turkish army in the siege of Belgrade in 1456. After repelling Ottoman attacks for over 70 years, Belgrade finally fell in 1521, along with the greater part of the Kingdom of Hungary. The rebellion of Serbian military commander Jovan Nenad between 1526 and 1528 led to the proclamation of the Second Serbian Empire in modern-day Serbian province of Vojvodina, which was among the last Serbian territories to resist the Ottomans. The Serbian Despotate fell in 1459, thus marking the two-century-long Ottoman conquest of Serbian principalities.

==== 1463–1503: Wars with Venice ====
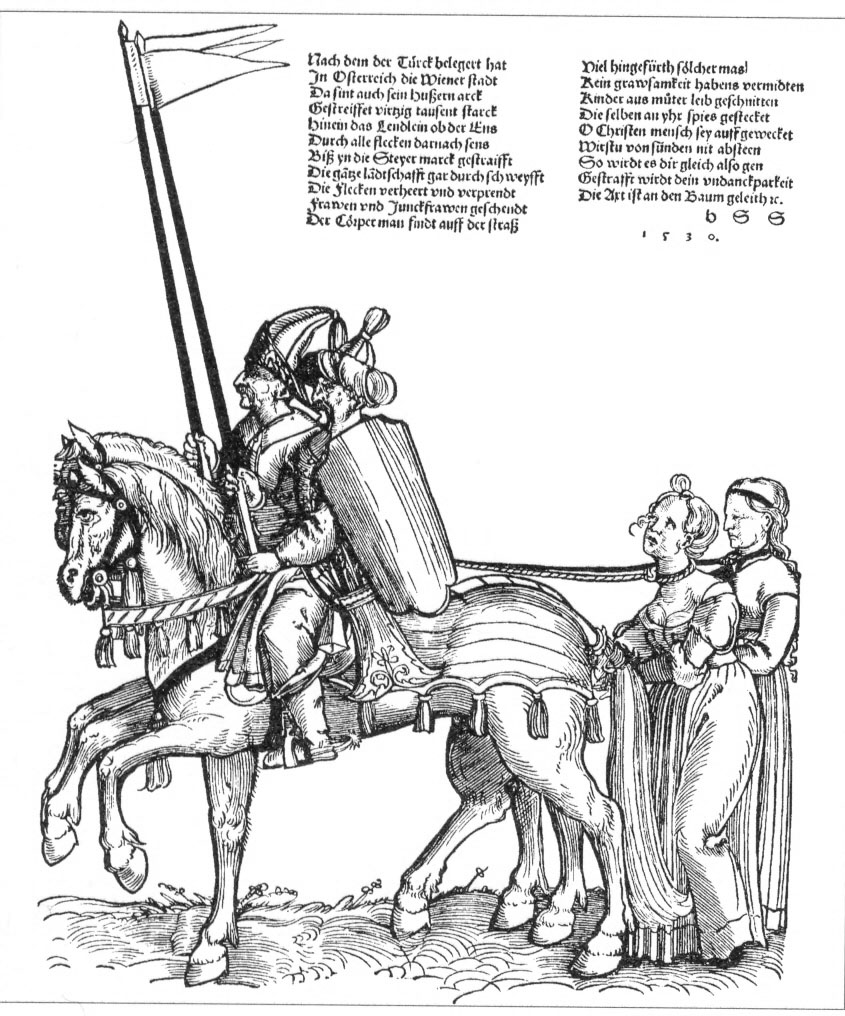
Ottoman advances resulted in some of the captive Christians being carried deep into Turkish territory

The wars with the Republic of Venice began in 1463. A favorable peace treaty was signed in 1479 after the lengthy siege of Shkodra (1478–79). In 1480, now no longer hampered by the Venetian fleet, the Ottomans besieged Rhodes and captured Otranto. War with Venice resumed from 1499 to 1503. In 1500, a Spanish–Venetian army commanded by Gonzalo de Córdoba took Kefalonia, temporarily stopping the Ottoman offensive on eastern Venetian territories. The offensive resumed after the Ottoman victory of Preveza (1538), fought between an Ottoman fleet commanded by Hayreddin Barbarossa and that of a Christian alliance assembled by Pope Paul III.

==== 1462–1476: Wallachian and Moldavian campaigns ====
In 1462, Mehmed II was driven back by Wallachian prince Vlad III Dracula in the Night Attack at Târgovişte. However, the latter was imprisoned by Hungarian king Matthias Corvinus. This caused outrage among many influential Hungarian figures and Western admirers of Vlad's success in the battle against the Ottoman Empire (and his early recognition of the threat it posed), including high-ranking members of the Vatican. Because of this, Matthias granted him the status of distinguished prisoner. Eventually, Dracula was freed in late 1475 and was sent with an army of Hungarian and Serbian soldiers to recover Bosnia from the Ottomans. There he defeated Ottoman forces for the first time. Upon this victory, Ottoman forces entered Wallachia in 1476 under the command of Mehmed II. Vlad was killed and, according to some sources, his head was sent to Constantinople to discourage the other rebellions. (Bosnia was completely added to Ottoman lands in 1482.)

The Turkish advance was temporarily halted after Stephen the Great of Moldavia defeated the armies of the Ottoman Sultan Mehmed II at the Battle of Vaslui in 1475, one of the greatest defeats of the Ottoman Empire until that time. Stephen was defeated the next year at Războieni (Battle of Valea Albă), but the Ottomans had to retreat after they failed to take any significant castle (see siege of Neamț Citadel) as a plague started to spread in the Ottoman army. Stephen's search for European assistance against the Turks met with little success, even though he had "cut off the pagan's right-hand", as he put it in a letter.

==== 1526–1566: Conquest of the Kingdom of Hungary ====
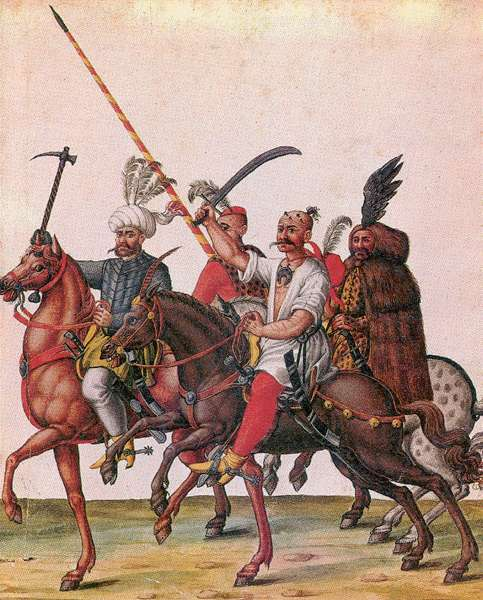
Ottoman soldiers in the territory of present-day Hungary

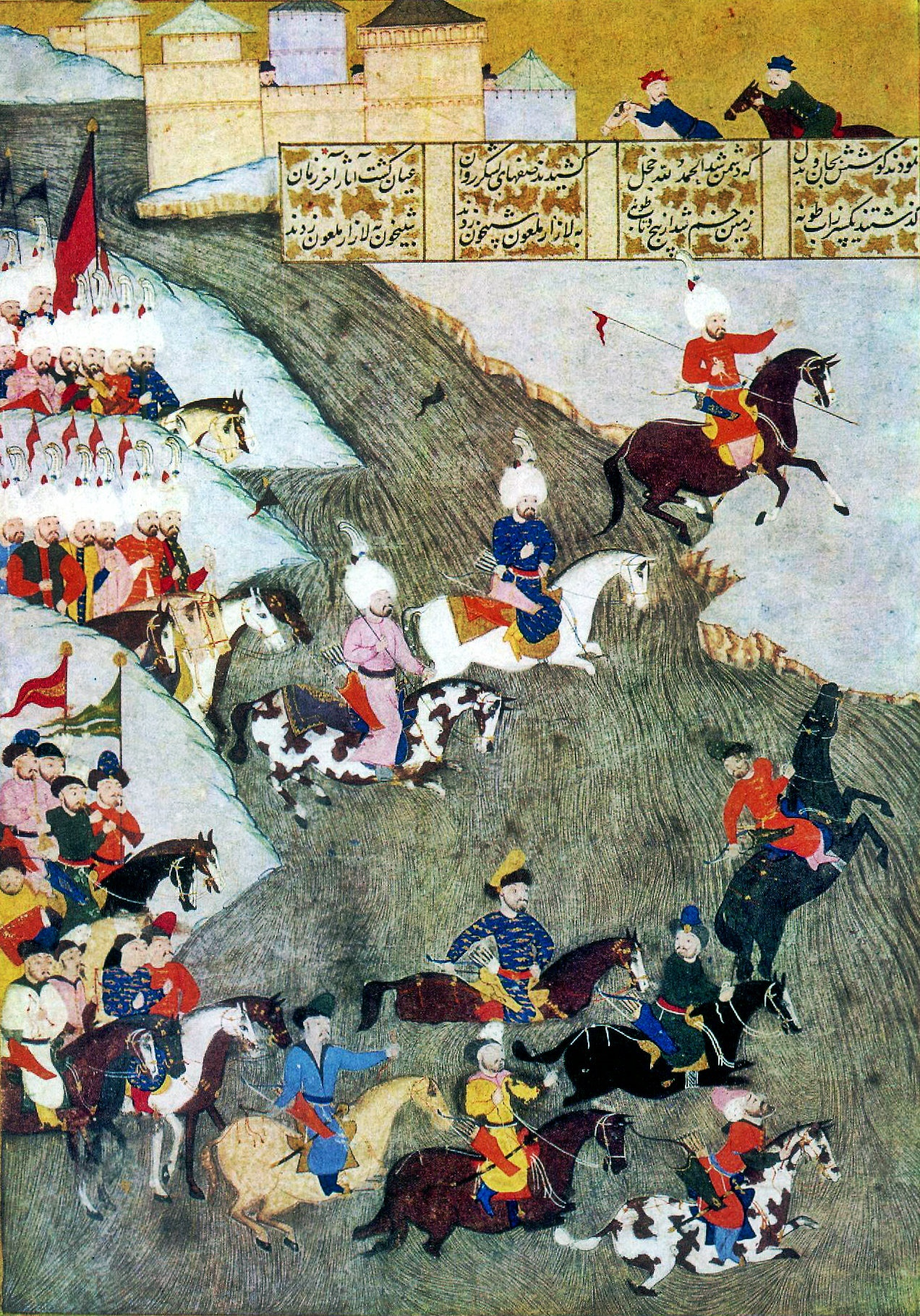
The Ottoman campaign in Hungary in 1566, Crimean Tatars as vanguard

Since the 1360s Hungary confronted the Ottoman Empire. The Kingdom of Hungary led several crusades, campaigns and carried out several defence battles and sieges against the Ottomans. Hungary bore the brunt of the Ottoman wars in Europe during the 15th century and successfully halted the Ottoman advance. From 1490, after the death of King Matthias of Hungary, the royal power declined. In 1521, Hungary was invaded by Sultan Suleiman the Magnificent, the border fortress Belgrade considered as the key and southern gate of the Kingdom of Hungary, after two previous sieges, the Ottomans captured this stronghold by the Third Siege of Belgrade. The Sultan launched an attack against the weakened kingdom, whose smaller army was defeated in 1526 at the Battle of Mohács and King Louis II of Hungary died.

After the Ottoman victory in the Battle of Mohács in 1526, only the southwestern part of the Kingdom of Hungary was actually conquered. The Ottoman campaign continued between 1526 and 1556 with small campaigns and major summer invasions – troops would return south of the Balkan Mountains before winter. In 1529, they mounted their first major attack on the Austrian Habsburg monarchy, attempting to conquer the city of Vienna (siege of Vienna). In 1532, another attack on Vienna with 60,000 troops in the main army was held up by the small fort (800 defenders) of Kőszeg in western Hungary, fighting a suicidal battle. The invading troops were held up until winter was close and the Habsburg Empire had assembled a force of 80,000 at Vienna. The Ottoman troops returned home through Styria, laying waste to the country.

In the meantime, in 1538, the Ottoman Empire invaded Moldavia. In 1541, another campaign in Hungary took Buda and Pest (which today together form the Hungarian capital Budapest) with a largely bloodless trick: after concluding peace talks with an agreement, troops stormed the open gates of Buda in the night. In retaliation for a failed Austrian counter-attack in 1542, the conquest of the western half of central Hungary was finished in the 1543 campaign that took both the most important royal ex-capital, Székesfehérvár, and the ex-seat of the cardinal, Esztergom. However, the army of 35–40,000 men was not enough for Suleiman to mount another attack on Vienna. A temporary truce was signed between the Habsburg and Ottoman Empires in 1547, which was soon disregarded by the Habsburgs.

In the major but moderately successful Ottoman campaign of 1552, two armies took the eastern part of central Hungary, pushing the borders of the Ottoman Empire to the second (inner) line of northern végvárs (border castles), which Hungary originally built as defence against an expected second Mongol invasion—hence, afterwards, borders on this front changed little. For Hungarians, the 1552 campaign was a series of tragic losses and some heroic (but pyrrhic) victories, which entered folklore—most notably the fall of Drégely (a small fort defended to the last man by just 146 men, and the siege of Eger. The latter was a major végvár with more than 2,000 men, without outside help. They faced two Ottoman armies, which were surprisingly unable to take the castle within five weeks. (The fort was later taken in 1596.) Finally, the 1556 campaign secured Ottoman influence over Transylvania (which had fallen under Habsburg control for a time), while failing to gain any ground on the western front, being tied down in the second (after 1555) unsuccessful siege of the southwestern Hungarian border castle of Szigetvár.

The Ottoman Empire conducted another major war against the Habsburgs and their Hungarian territories between 1566 and 1568. The 1566 siege of Szigetvár, the third siege in which the fort was finally taken, but the aged Sultan died, deterring that year's push for Vienna.

==== 1522–1573: Rhodes, Malta and the Holy League ====
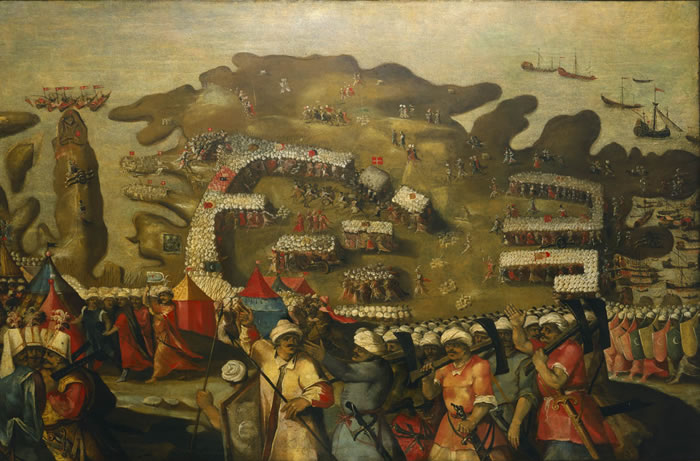
The siege of Malta – Arrival of the Turkish Fleet by Matteo Perez d'Aleccio

Ottoman forces invaded and captured the island of Rhodes in 1522, after two previous failed attempts (see Siege of Rhodes (1522)). The Knights of Saint John were banished to Malta, which was in turn besieged in 1565.

After a siege of three months, the Ottoman army failed to control all of the Maltese forts. Delaying the Ottomans until bad weather conditions and the arrival of Sicilian reinforcements, made Ottoman commander Kızılahmedli Mustafa Pasha quit the siege. Around 22,000 to 48,000 Ottoman troops against 6,000 to 8,500 Maltese troops, the Ottomans failed to conquer Malta, sustaining more than 25,000 losses, including one of the greatest Muslim corsair generals of the time, Dragut, and were repulsed. Had Malta fallen, Sicily and mainland Italy could have fallen under the threat of an Ottoman invasion. The victory of Malta during this event, which is nowadays known as the Great Siege of Malta, turned the tide and gave Europe hopes and motivation. It also marked the importance of the Knights of Saint John and their relevant presence in Malta to aid Christendom in its defence against the Muslim conquest.

The Ottoman naval victories of this period were in the Battle of Preveza (1538) and the Battle of Djerba (1560).

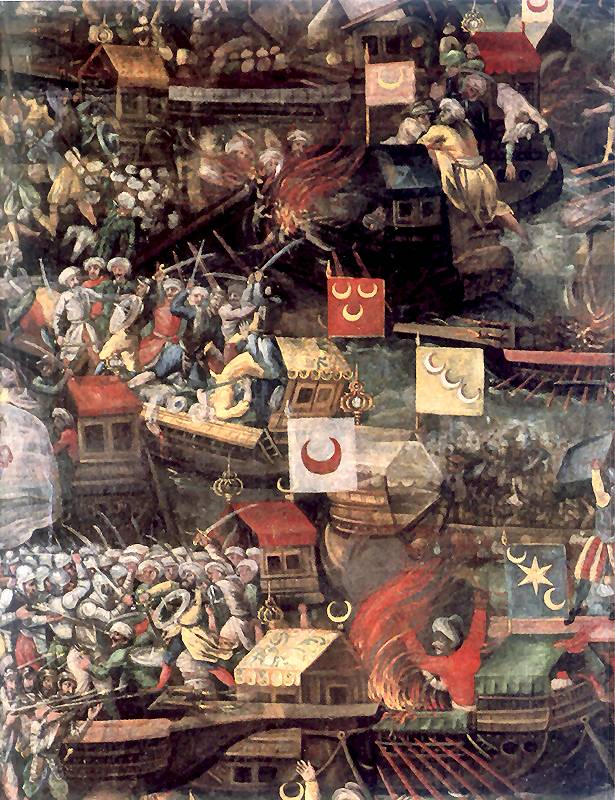
Battle of Lepanto on 7 October 1571

The Mediterranean campaign, which lasted from 1570 to 1573, resulted in the Ottoman conquest of Cyprus. A Holy League of Venice, the Papal States, Spain, the Knights of Saint John in Malta and initially Portugal was formed against the Ottoman Empire during this period. The League's victory in the Battle of Lepanto (1571) briefly ended Ottoman predominance at sea.

==== 1570–1571: Conquest of Cyprus ====
In the summer of 1570, the Turks struck again, but this time with a full-scale invasion rather than a raid. About 60,000 troops, including cavalry and artillery, under the command of Lala Mustafa Pasha landed unopposed near Limassol on 2 July 1570, and laid siege to Nicosia. In an orgy of victory on the day that the city fell—9 September, every public building and palace was looted. Word of the superior Ottoman numbers spread, and a few days later Mustafa took Kyrenia without having to fire a shot. Famagusta, however, resisted and put up a defense that lasted from September 1570 until August 1571.

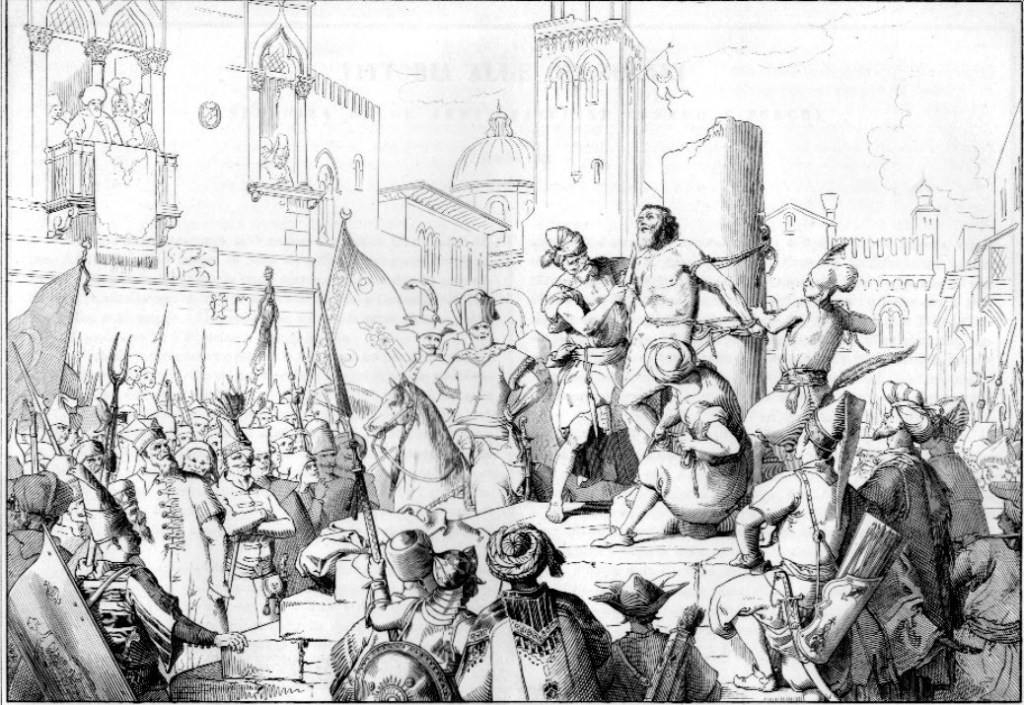
Marco Antonio Bragadin, Venetian commander of Famagusta flayed alive by the Turks after a year's defense of the city in 1571

The fall of Famagusta marked the beginning of the Ottoman period in Cyprus. Two months later, the naval forces of the Holy League, composed mainly of Venetian, Spanish, and Papal ships under the command of Don John of Austria, defeated the Ottoman fleet at the Battle of Lepanto in one of the decisive battles of world history. The victory over the Turks, however, came too late to help Cyprus, and the island remained under Ottoman rule for the next three centuries.

In 1570, the Ottoman Empire first conquered Cyprus, and Lala Mustafa Pasha became the first Ottoman governor of Cyprus, challenging the claims of Venice. Simultaneously, the Pope formed a coalition between the Papal States, Malta, Spain, Venice and several other Italian states, with no real result. In 1573 the Venetians left, removing the influence of the Roman Catholic Church.

==== 1593–1669: Austria, Venice and Wallachia ====
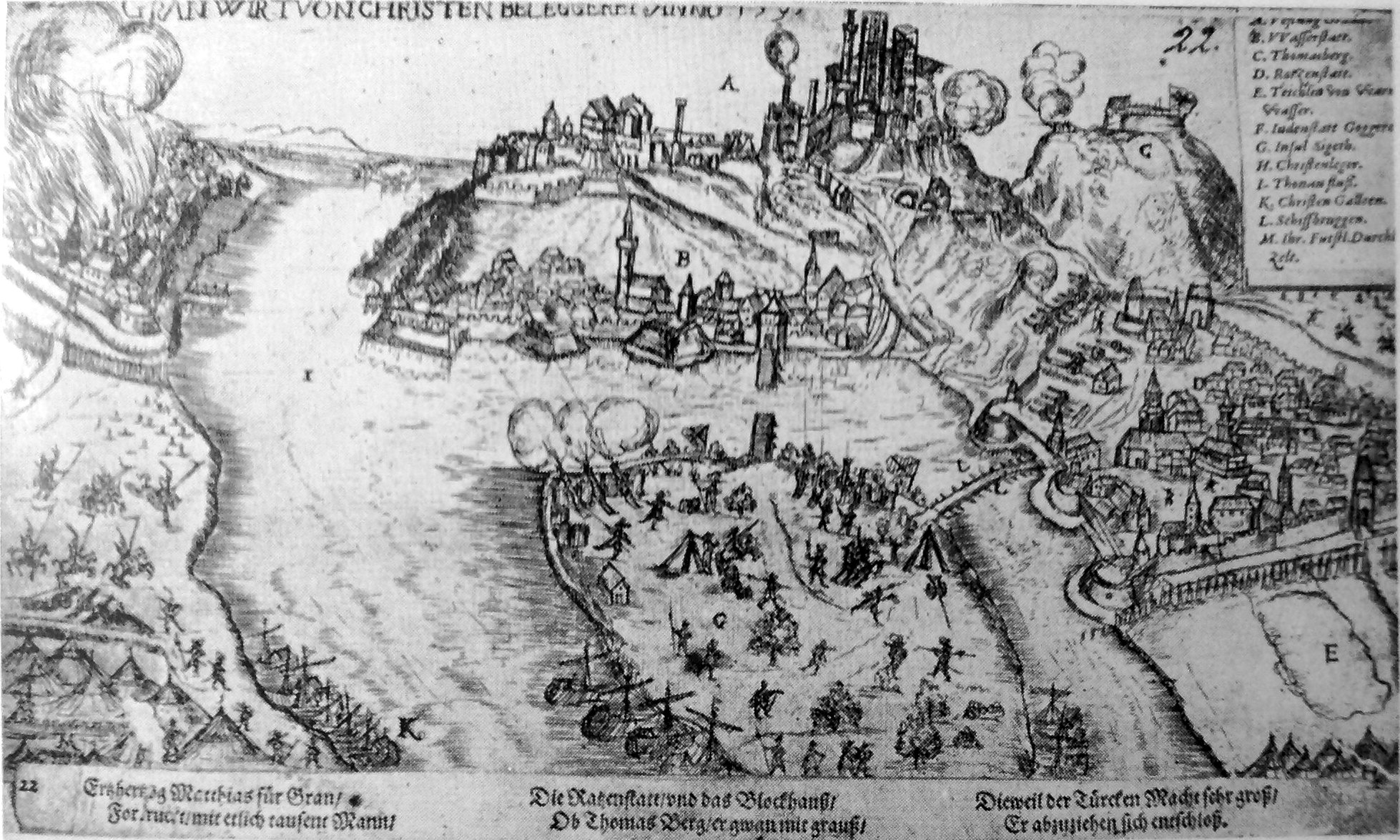
Siege of Esztergom in 1595

- Long War (15-year war with Austria, 1593–1606) ends with status quo.
- Michael the Brave campaign against the Ottoman Empire (1593–1601)
- War with Venice 1645–1669 and the conquest of Crete (see Cretan War (1645–1669)).
- Austro-Turkish War (1663–1664): failed Ottoman attempt to defeat and invade Austria.

==== 1620–1621: Poland-Lithuania ====
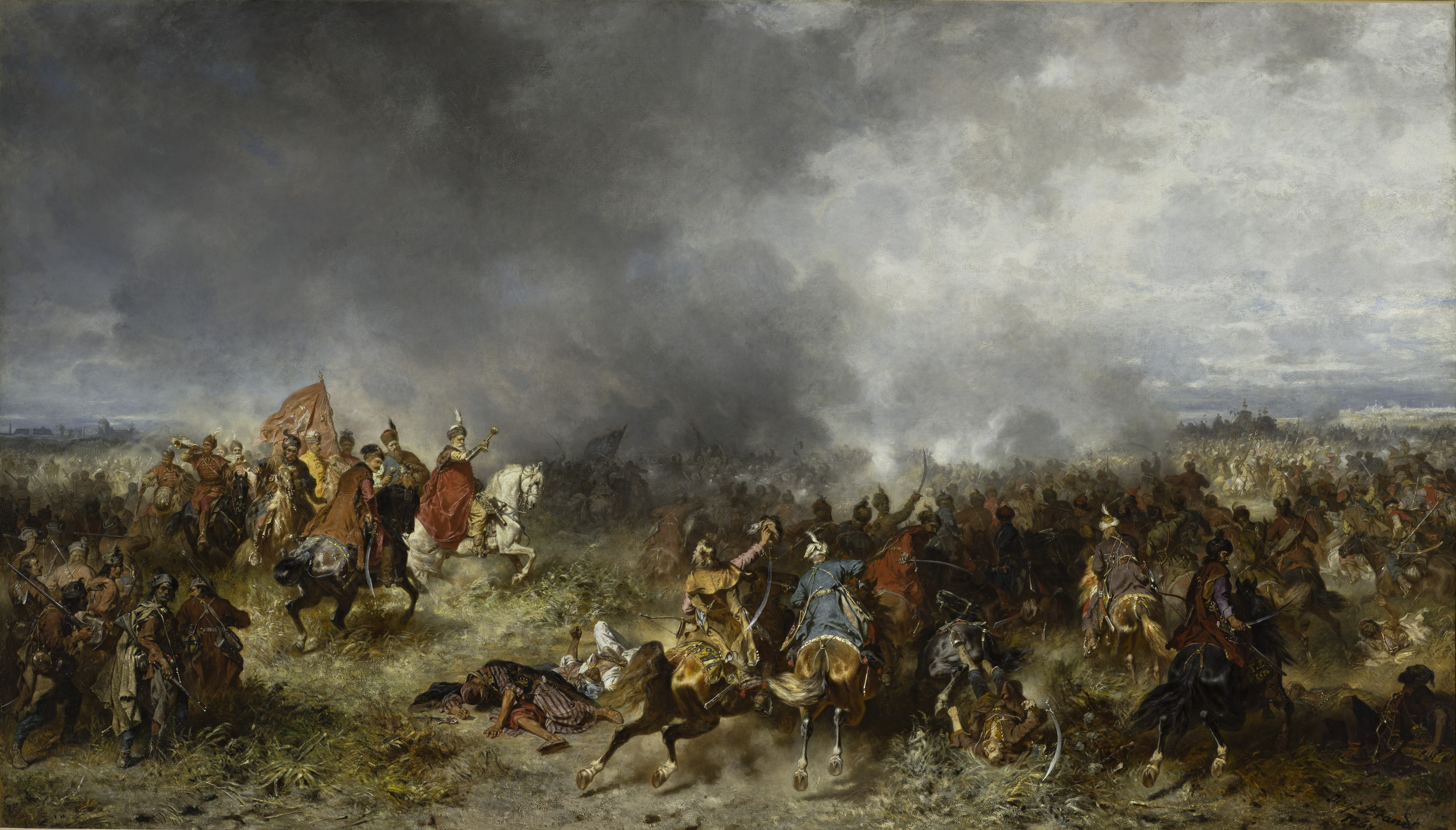
The Battle of Khotyn in 1621, during which a joint Ukrainian Cossack and Polish forces defeated the Ottomans and their Tatar allies

Wars fought over Moldavia. The Polish army advanced into Moldavia and was defeated in the Battle of Ţuţora. The next year, the Poles repelled the Turkish invasion in the Battle of Khotyn. Another conflict started in 1633 but was soon settled.

==== 1657–1683 Conclusion of wars with Habsburgs ====
Transylvania, the Eastern part of the former Hungarian Kingdom, gained semi-independence in 1526, while paying tribute to the Ottoman Empire. In 1657, Transylvania under George II Rákóczi felt strong enough to attack the Tatars to the East (then the Empire's vassals), and later the Ottoman Empire itself, which had come to the Tatars' defence. The war lasted until 1662, ending in defeat for the Hungarians. The Western part of the Hungarian Kingdom (Partium) was annexed and placed under direct Ottoman control. At the same time, there was another campaign against Austria between 1663 and 1664. Despite being defeated in the Battle of Saint Gotthard on 1 August 1664 by Raimondo Montecuccoli, the Ottomans secured recognition of their conquest of Nové Zámky in the Peace of Vasvár with Austria, marking the greatest territorial extent of Ottoman rule in the former Hungarian Kingdom.

==== 1672–1676: Poland-Lithuania ====
The Polish–Ottoman War (1672–1676) ended with the Treaty of Żurawno, in which the Polish–Lithuanian Commonwealth ceded control of most of its Ukrainian territories to the empire. The war showed the increasing weakness and disorder of the Commonwealth, who by the second half of the 17th century had started its gradual decline that would culminate a century later with the partitions of Poland.

=== Stagnation (1683–1828) ===
==== 1683–1699: Great Turkish War – Loss of Hungary and the Morea ====
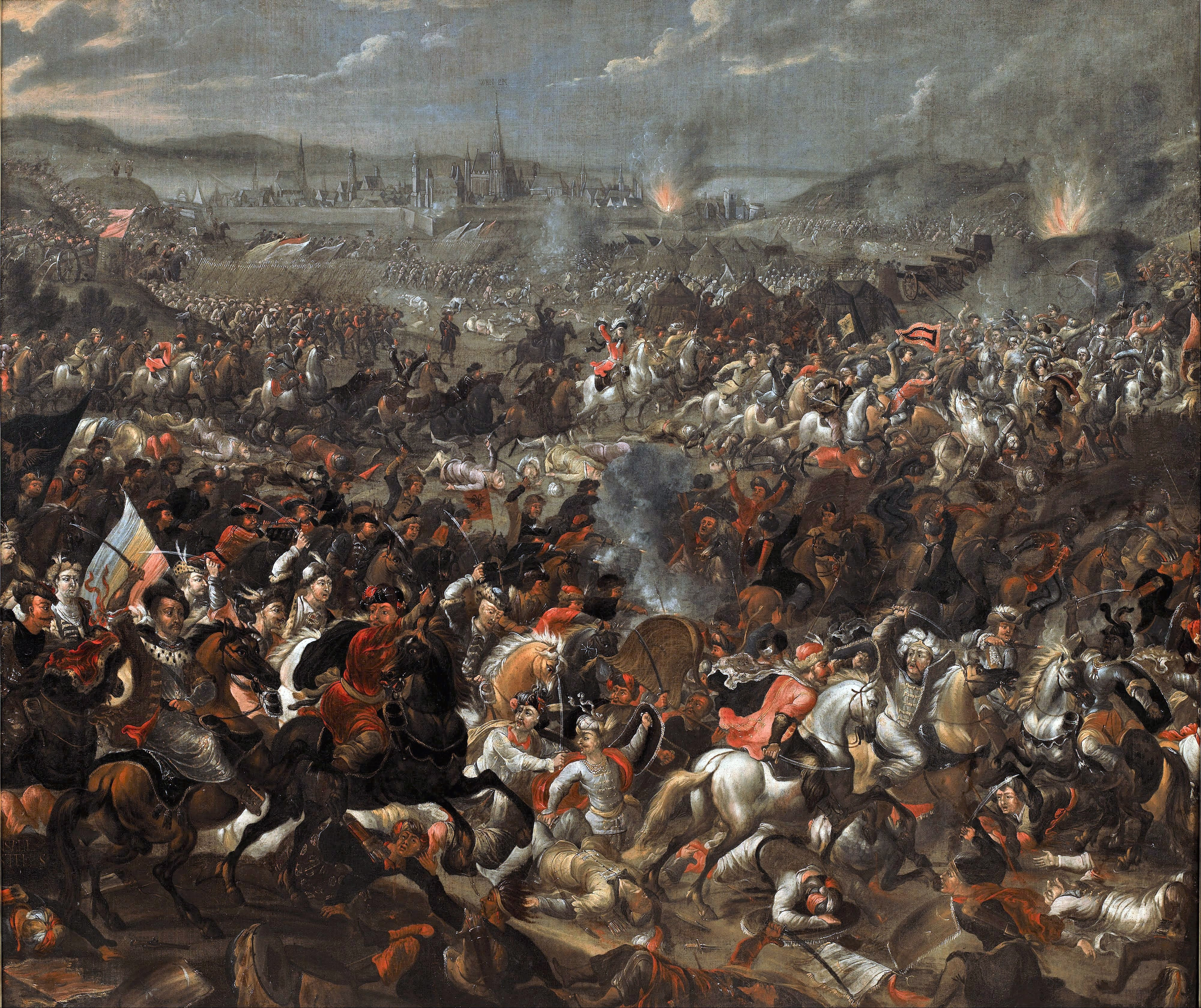
Battle of Vienna on 12 September 1683 by Gonzales Franciscus Casteels

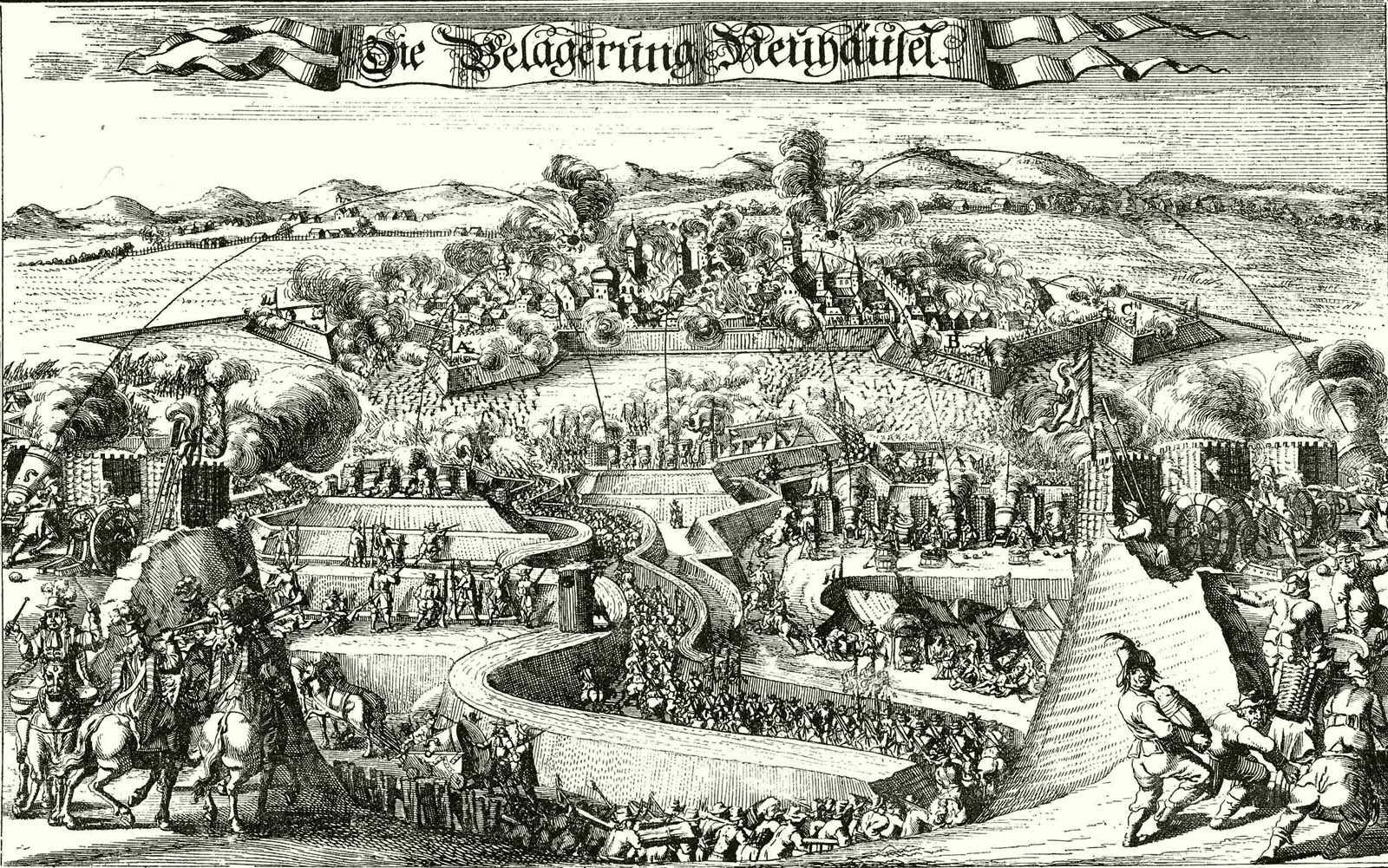
Siege of Érsekújvár in what is today Nové Zámky, Slovakia, 1685

The Great Turkish War started in 1683, with a grand invasion force of 140,000 men marching on Vienna, supported by Protestant Hungarian noblemen rebelling against Habsburg rule. To stop the invasion, another Holy League was formed, composed of Austria and Poland (notably in the Battle of Vienna), Venetians and the Russian Empire, Vienna had been besieged by the Ottoman Empire for two months. The battle marked the first time the Polish–Lithuanian Commonwealth and the Holy Roman Empire had cooperated militarily against the Ottomans, and it is often seen as a turning point in history, after which "the Ottoman Turks ceased to be a menace to the Christian world". (Note: The defeat of the Ottoman Army outside the gates of Vienna 300 years ago is usually regarded as the beginning of the decline of the Ottoman Empire. But Walter Leitsch asks whether it was such a turning point in the history of Europe? ... However, it marks a turning point: not only was further Ottoman advance on Christian territories stopped, but in the following war that lasted up to 1698 almost all of Hungary was reconquered by the army of Emperor Leopold I. From 1683 the Ottoman Turks ceased to be a menace to the Christian world. ... The battle of Vienna was a turning point in one further respect: the success was due to the co-operation between the troops of the Emperor, some Imperial princes and the Poles. ... However the co-operation between the two non-maritime neighbours of the Ottoman Empire in Europe, the Emperor and Poland, was something new. ... Walter Leitsch is Professor of East European History and Director of the Institute of East and Southeast European Research at the University of Vienna.) In the ensuing war that lasted until 1699, the Ottomans lost almost all of Hungary to the Holy Roman Emperor Leopold I.

After winning the Battle of Vienna, the Holy League gained the upper hand and reconquered Hungary (Buda and Pest were retaken in 1686, the former under the command of a Swiss-born convert to Islam). At the same time, the Venetians launched an expedition into Greece, which conquered the Peloponnese. During the 1687 Venetian attack on the city of Athens (conquered by the Ottomans), the Ottomans turned the ancient Parthenon into an ammunitions storehouse. A Venetian mortar hit the Parthenon, detonating the Ottoman gunpowder stored inside, partially destroying it.

The war ended with the Treaty of Karlowitz in 1699. Prince Eugene of Savoy first distinguished himself in 1683 and remained the most important Austrian commander until 1718.

==== 18th century ====
The Fourth Russo-Turkish War took place in 1710–1711 in the basin of the Pruth river, as part of the Great Northern War. It was instigated by Charles XII of Sweden after the defeat at the Battle of Poltava, in order to tie down Russia with the Ottoman Empire and gain some breathing space in the increasingly unsuccessful campaign. The Russians were severely beaten but not annihilated, and after the Treaty of the Pruth was signed, the Ottoman Empire disengaged, allowing Russia to refocus its energies on the defeat of Sweden.

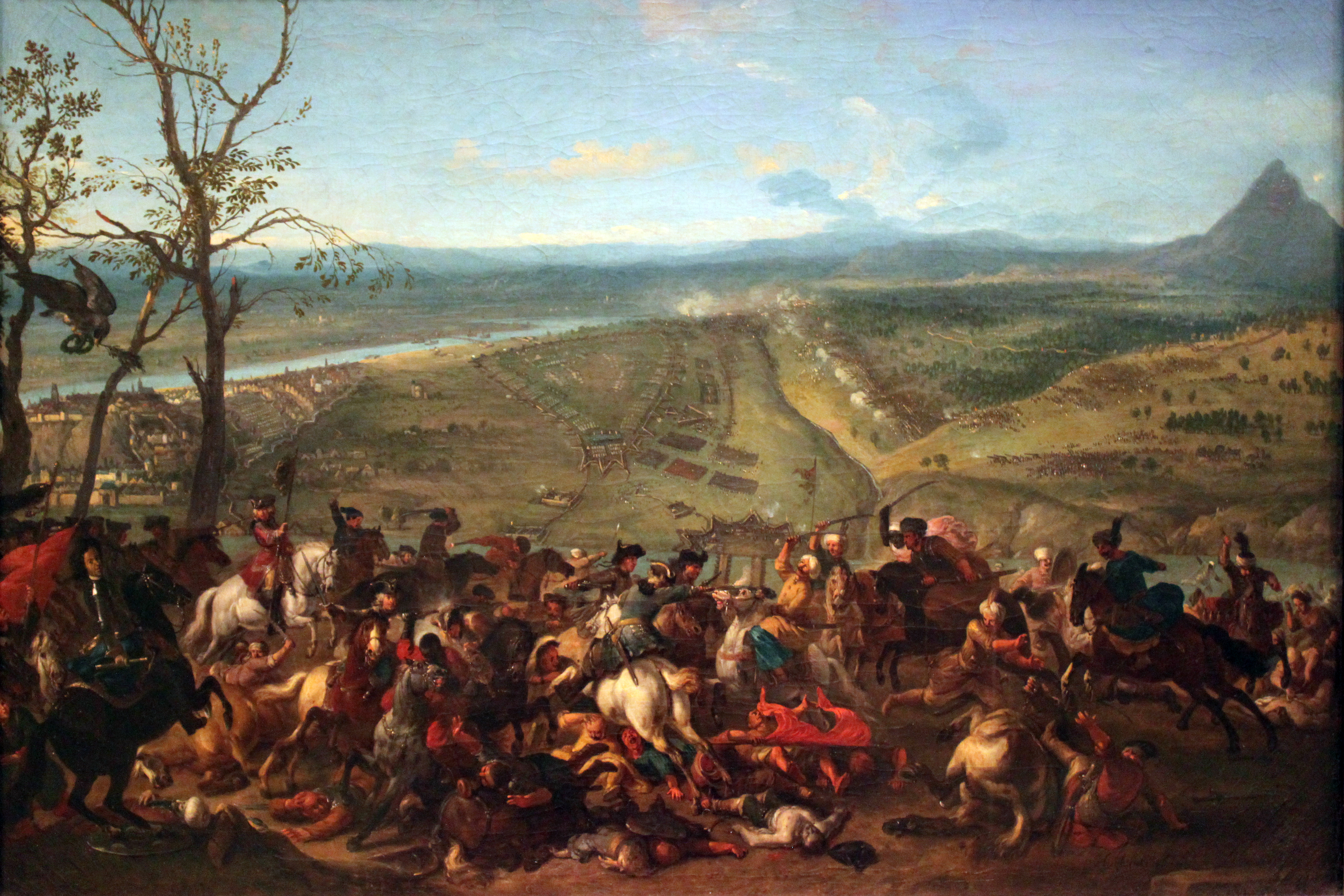
Austrian conquest of Belgrade: 1717 by Eugene of Savoy, during the Austro-Turkish War (1716–1718)

The Ottoman–Venetian War started in 1714. It overlapped with the Austro-Turkish War (1716–1718), in which Austria conquered the remaining areas of the former Hungarian Kingdom, ending with the Treaty of Passarowitz in 1718.

A war erupted again with Russia in 1735 and Austria in 1737. It lasted until 1739 when the Treaty of Belgrade was signed with Austria and the Treaty of Niš with Russia.

The Sixth Russo-Turkish War started in 1768 and ended in 1774 with the Treaty of Küçük Kaynarca. As a result of this treaty, the Crimean Khanate became a Russian client state.

Another war with Russia started in 1787 and a concurrent war with Austria followed in 1788; the Austrian war ended with the 1791 Treaty of Sistova, and the Russian war ended with the 1792 Treaty of Jassy.

An invasion of Egypt and Syria by Napoleon I of France took place in 1798–99, but ended due to British intervention.

Napoleon's capture of Malta on his way to Egypt resulted in the unusual alliance of Russia and the Ottomans resulting in a joint naval expedition to the Ionian Islands. Their successful capture of these islands led to the setting up of the Septinsular Republic.

==== 19th century ====
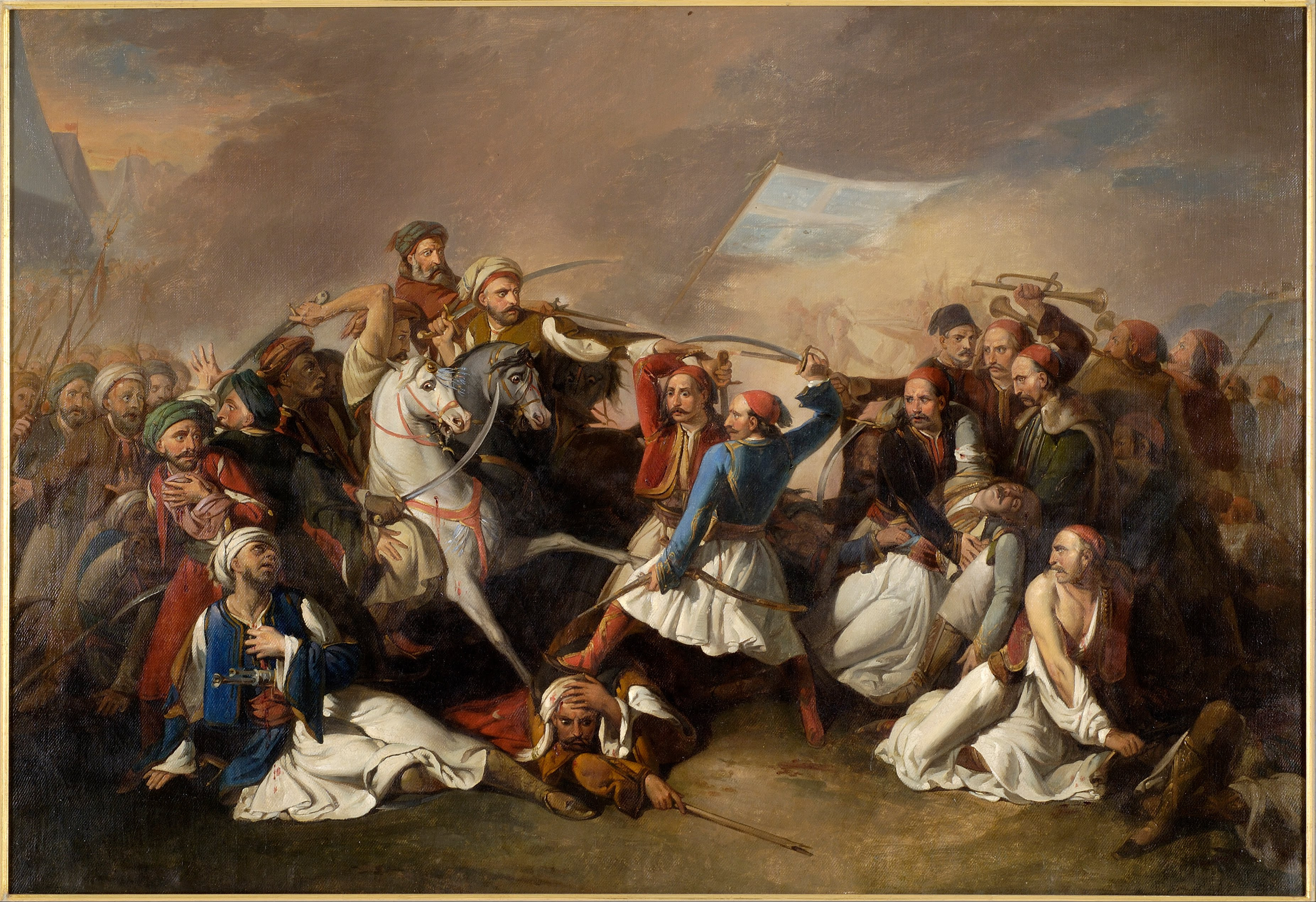
Greek War of Independence

The First Serbian Uprising took place in 1804, followed by the Second Serbian Uprising in 1815. The result of this successful Serbian Revolution was the establishment of a semi-independent Principality of Serbia, and its acknowledgment by the Ottoman Empire (although de jure independent in domestic matters, the principality had to pay a yearly tax to the Porte and accept the permanent presence of the Ottoman army on its soil).

The Eighth Russo-Turkish War began in 1806 and ended in May 1812, just 13 days before Napoleon's invasion of Russia.

The Moldavian–Wallachian (Romanian) Uprising (starting simultaneously with the Greek Revolution).

The Greek War of Independence started in 1821. The Great Powers intervened from 1827 in support of the revolutionaries, including Russia (Ninth Russo-Turkish War). The Treaty of Adrianople ended the war in 1829, and forced the Ottomans to accept Greek independence (as the new Kingdom of Greece), more autonomy for Serbia and the Russian occupation of the Romanian principalities.

=== Ottoman decline (1828–1908) ===
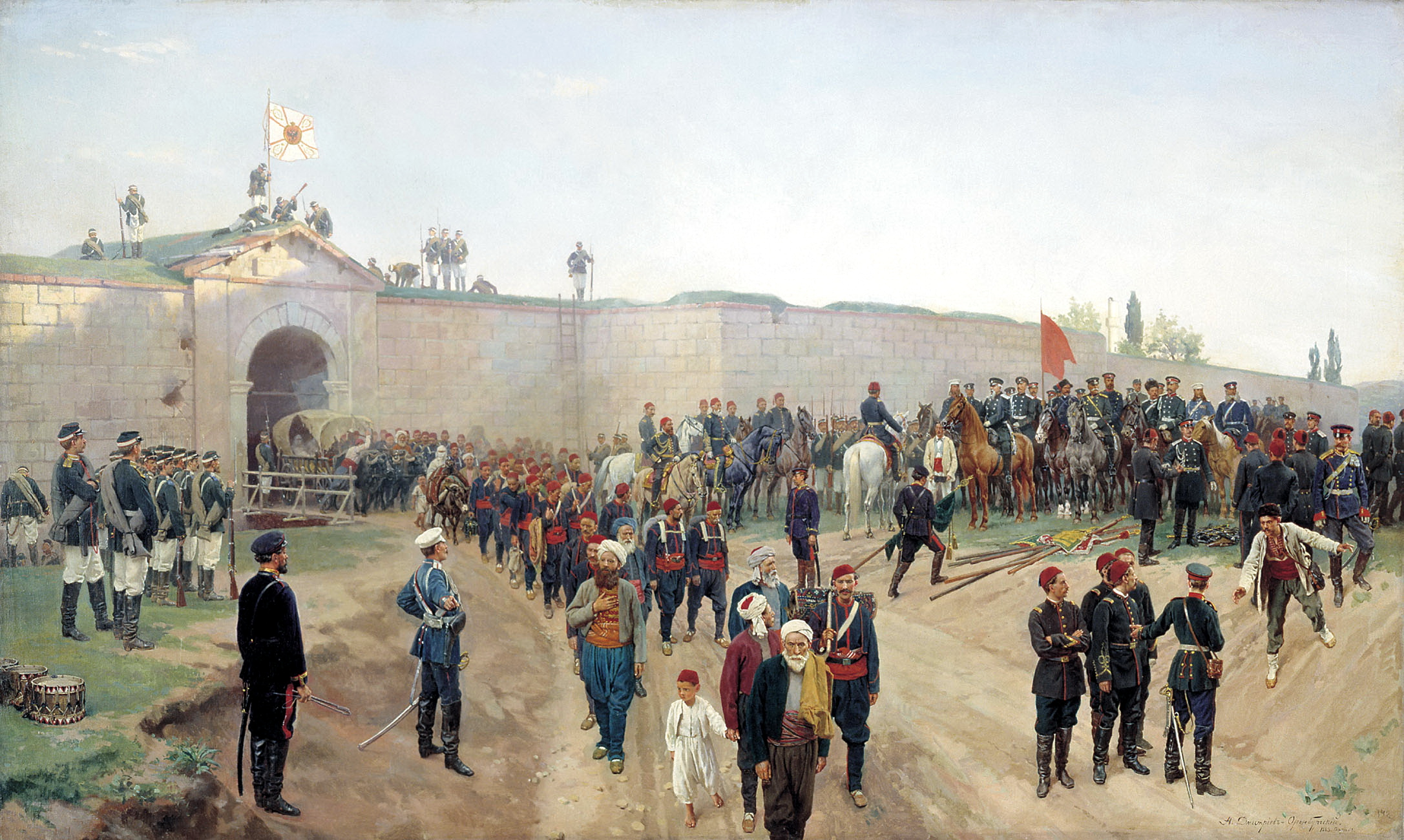
Ottoman capitulation at Nikopol, 1877

The decline of the Ottoman Empire included the following conflicts.

Albanian rebellions 1820–1822, 1830–1839, 1843, 1845, 1847.

Bosnian rebellions 1831–1836, 1836–1837, 1841.

War with Montenegro 1852–1853.

Herzegovina uprising (1852–1862)

The Tenth Russo-Turkish War of 1853–56, better known as the Crimean War, in which the United Kingdom and France joined the war on the side of the Ottoman Empire. Ended with the Treaty of Paris.

1854 Macedonian rebellion

Second war with Montenegro in 1858–1859.

War with Montenegro, Bosnia and Serbia in 1862.

Cretan Uprising in 1866.

1867 Macedonian rebellion

The decision to increase taxes to Christian nations in the empire's Balkan provinces resulted in widespread outrage that lead to several revolts. The first was the Herzegovinian Uprising in 1875, followed by Bulgarian revolutionaries starting an uprising in April 1876 that was brutally suppressed (see Batak massacre). Later in June, Serbia and Montenegro jointly declared war on the empire. After six months of inconclusive fighting, international reaction to atrocities committed by Turkish troops forced intervention of the major European powers, which concluded a ceasefire. In December, the Constantinople Conference was organized to deal with the situation and resolve the crisis. However, the Ottoman Empire refused the proposed reforms and withdrew from the Conference.

Russia, inspired by Pan-Slavism and feeling support in the anti-Ottoman sympathies running throughout Europe, saw the chance to declare war on the Ottoman Empire and fulfill the union of all Orthodox nations in the Balkans under its mantle. That started the eleventh Russo-Turkish War in 1877, fought in the Balkans and in the Caucasus, with Russia leading a coalition with Bulgaria, Romania, Serbia and Montenegro. The coalition won the war, pushing the Ottomans all the way back to the gates of Constantinople. Russians and Ottomans signed the Treaty of San Stefano in early 1878. After deliberations at the Congress of Berlin, which was attended by all the Great Powers of the time, the Treaty of Berlin (1878) provided independence or autonomy for the Christian nations in the empire's Balkan territories, and drastically restructured the map of the region.

Shortly after the war, Austria-Hungary was allowed to militarily occupy Bosnia, which formally continued to be part of the Ottoman territories.

Eastern Rumelia was granted some autonomy in 1878, but then rebelled and joined Bulgaria in 1885. Thessaly was ceded to Greece in 1881, but after Greece attacked the Ottoman Empire to help the Second Cretan Uprising in 1897, Greece was defeated in Thessaly. Crete would gain autonomy in 1898 after the Cretan Revolt (1897–1898).

=== Dissolution (1908–22) ===
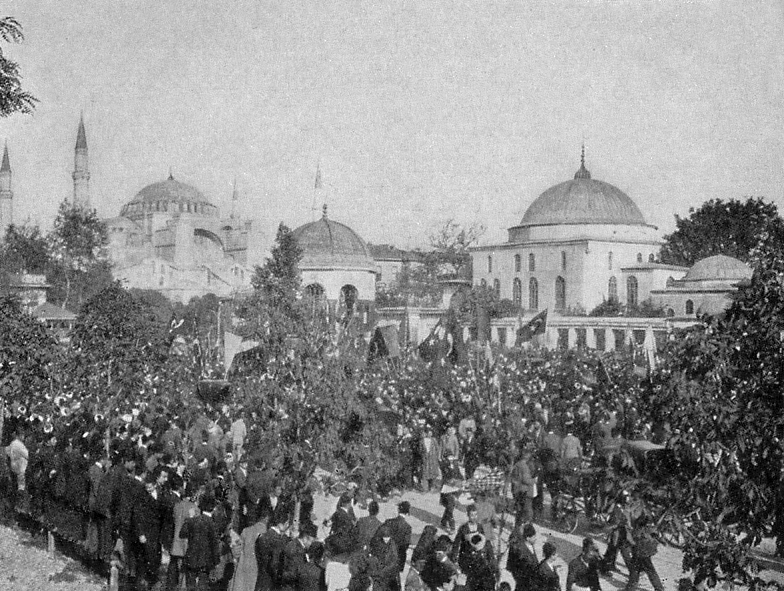
Public demonstration in the Sultanahmet district of Constantinople, 1908

==== Italo-Turkish War ====
In 1911, Italy invaded Ottoman Tripolitania (During the colonisation of Africa, Tripolitania became Libya), which was controlled by the Ottoman Empire. The war ended with the Italian annexation of the Tripolitania.

==== Ilinden–Preobrazhenie Uprising ====
Bulgaro-Macedonian insurrection from 1903. See Ilinden–Preobrazhenie Uprising.

==== 1912–13: Balkan Wars ====
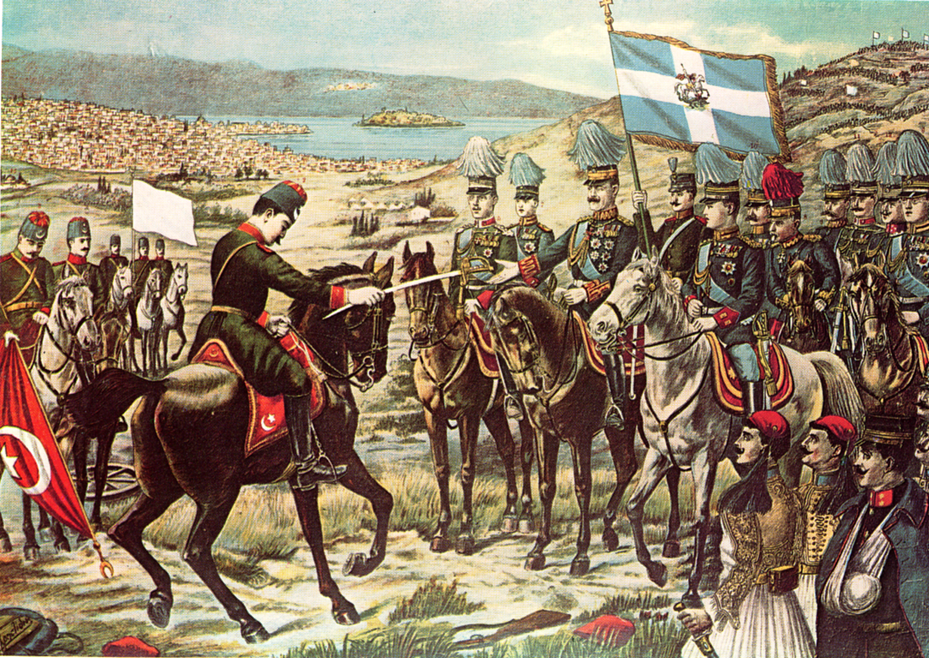
Surrender of Ioannina by Esat Pasha to the Greek Crown Prince Constantine during the First Balkan War.

Two Balkan Wars, in 1912 and 1913, entailed further action against the Ottoman Empire in Europe. The Balkan League first conquered Macedonia and most of Thrace from the Ottoman Empire, and then fell out over the division of the spoils. Albania declared its independence from the Ottoman Empire in 1912, after several rebellions and uprisings. This reduced Turkey's possessions in Europe (Rumelia) to their present borders in Eastern Thrace.

==== World War I ====
World War I (1914–1918) became the ultimate cause of the collapse of the Ottoman Empire, which formally ended in 1922. However, during wartime operations the Empire prevented the British Royal Navy from reaching Constantinople, stopping an Entente invasion in the Battle of Gallipoli (1915–1916). Nevertheless, under the provisions of the Treaty of Lausanne (1923) the Empire ultimately fell.

== See also ==
- List of wars involving the Ottoman Empire
- Ottoman wars in Africa
- Ottoman wars in Asia
- Military of the Ottoman Empire
