= Byzantine–Ottoman wars =

Conflicts between the Byzantine and Ottoman empires (1299–1453)

- Part of the rise of the Ottoman Empire and decline of the Byzantine Empire
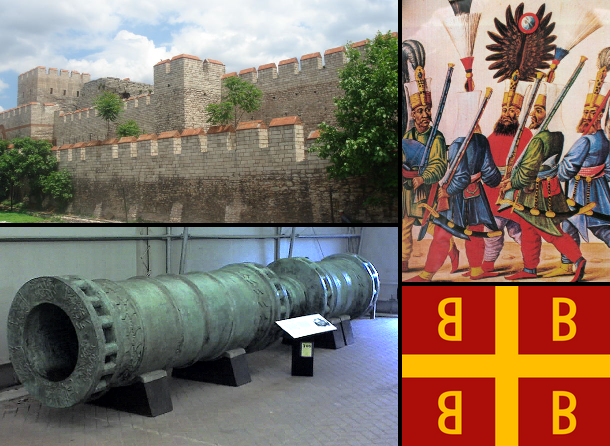
- Clockwise from top-left: Walls of Constantinople, Ottoman janissaries, Byzantine flag, Ottoman bronze cannon
Date	1299–1490 (Note: Byzantine political tradition persisted in the Mani peninsula following the fall of Constantinople in 1453 and subsequent annexation of several remaining successor states. Mani retained substantial autonomy amid the expansion of Ottoman authority in the Peloponnese. with the return of the Byzantine-Maniot commander Krokodeilos Kladas in 1490 and his subsequent death during a renewed conflict.)
Location	Anatolia; Balkans; Crimea (Note: Siege of Theodoro (1475))
Result	Ottoman victory
Territorial changes	Fall and annexation of Constantinople and remaining remnants of the Byzantine Empire

Belligerents
Ottoman Empire	Byzantine Empire; Greek rebels (including Maniots); Despotate of the Morea; Empire of Trebizond; Principality of Theodoro; Despotate of Epirus Supported by: Catalan Company; Republic of Genoa; Republic of Venice; Kingdom of Sicily; Kingdom of Hungary; Papal States; Serbian Despotate; Kingdom of France; Ottoman pretenders

The Byzantine–Ottoman wars were a series of decisive conflicts between the Byzantine Greeks and Ottoman Turks and their allies that led to the final destruction of the Byzantine Empire and the rise of the Ottoman Empire. The Byzantines, already having been in a weak state even before the dismemberment of their Empire following the Fourth Crusade, failed to recover fully under the rule of the Palaiologos dynasty. Thus, the Byzantines faced increasingly disastrous defeats at the hands of the Ottomans. Ultimately, they lost Constantinople in 1453, formally ending the conflicts (however, several Byzantine holdouts lasted until 1479).

Taking advantage of a weakening Byzantine Empire, the Seljuk Sultanate of Rum began seizing territory in western Anatolia, until the Nicaean Empire was able to repel the Seljuk Turks from the remaining territories still under Byzantine rule. Constantinople was retaken from the Latin Empire in 1261 by the Nicaean Empire, but the position of the Byzantine Empire in Europe remained uncertain due to the presence of the rival powers in Epirus, Serbia and Bulgaria. This, combined with the declining power of the Sultanate of Rum (Byzantium's chief rival in Asia Minor) led to the removal of troops from Anatolia to maintain Byzantium's grip on Thrace.

The decay of the Sultanate of Rum brought unexpected instability to the Anatolian frontier, as warriors known as ghazis began setting up fiefdoms at the expense of the Byzantine Empire. While many Turkish beys participated in the conquest of Byzantine and Seljuk territory, the territories under the control of one such bey, Osman I, posed the greatest threat to Constantinople. Within 90 years of Osman I's establishment of the Ottoman beylik, the Byzantines lost all of their Anatolian territory and by 1400, Byzantine Thrace was also lost to the Ottomans. Timur's invasion of 1402, and the subsequent Ottoman Interregnum allowed a ruined Constantinople to stave off defeat until it finally fell in 1453. After having taken the city, Ottoman supremacy in the eastern Mediterranean was largely secured. This helped lead to the end of the Middle Ages and the beginning of the Age of Discovery.

== Rise of the Ottomans: 1265–1328 ==
East Mediterranean c. 1263. Key: Dark green: Ottoman domain by the 1300s, dotted line indicates conquests up to 1326. Light red: Byzantine Empire. Light green: Turkic lands. Yellow: Cilicia. Red/blue: Latin states

Following the Byzantine reconquest of Constantinople in 1261, the Byzantine Empire was left in an isolated position. There was plenty of talk among the remaining Latin duchies of the Greek mainland and other regions of retaking Constantinople for the Latin Empire whilst to the north another significant threat came from Serbian expansion into the Balkans by king Stefan Uroš I.

What was once a strong frontier under the Komnenian dynasty at the Danube river now threatened Constantinople itself. To solve these problems, Michael VIII began consolidating his rule; he had the younger co-emperor John IV blinded, which resulted in much resentment. To counter this, the Byzantine Emperor installed a new Patriarch of Constantinople, Germanus III, ordering him to lift an excommunication that had been placed against him by the former Patriarch Arsenios Autoreianos and to submit to the authority of Rome in order to alleviate the Latin threat. As the Byzantine Empire continued the conquest of Latin territory, the Turks under Osman I began their raids into Byzantine Anatolia; Söğüt and Eskişehir were taken in 1265 and 1289 respectively. Michael Palaiologos was unable to deal with these early setbacks due to the need to transfer troops to the West. In 1282, Michael Palaiologos died and his son Andronikos II took power. The death of the old Byzantine Emperor came as a relief for the society at large; his policy of Latin appeasement to the Church in Rome, heavy taxation and military expenditure placed a severe burden on the people. As the Ottoman Turks began taking land from the Empire, they were seen as liberators by some Anatolians and a significant minority converted to Islam, undermining the Byzantine's Orthodox power base.

Andronikos' rule was marked by incompetence and short-sighted decisions that in the long run would damage the Byzantine Empire beyond repair. He began to debase the Byzantine hyperpyron, resulting in a reduction of the value of the Byzantine economy; taxes were decreased for the Powerful, i.e. landed aristocracy and instead placed upon the Knight-class Pronoia. To popularize his rule he repudiated the union of the Orthodox and Catholic Churches decreed by the Second Council of Lyon in 1274, thereby further increasing hostilities between the Latins and the Byzantines. Andronikos II took a deep interest in preserving the Anatolian lands of Byzantium and ordered construction of forts in Asia Minor and vigorous training of the army. The Byzantine Emperor ordered that his court be moved to Anatolia to oversee the campaigns there and instructed his General Alexios Philanthropenos to push back the Turks. Early successes were rendered useless when Alexios staged an unsuccessful coup, leading to his blinding and the end of his campaigns. This allowed the Ottomans to lay siege to Nicaea in 1301. A further defeat on Andronikos' son Michael IX and the Byzantine general George Mouzalon occurred at Magnesia and Bapheus in 1302. Despite this, Andronikos tried once more to strike a decisive blow back at the Turks, this time hiring Catalan mercenaries. Under the guidance of Michael IX and the leadership of Roger de Flor, the 6,500-strong Catalan Company in the spring and summer of 1303 managed to drive back the Turks. The mercenaries' onslaught drove the Turks back from Philadelphia to Cyzicus, in the process causing great destruction to the Anatolian landscape. Once again these gains were thwarted by internal matters. Roger de Flor was assassinated and, in revenge, his company began pillaging the Anatolian countryside. When they finally left in 1307 to attack Byzantine Thrace, the locals welcomed the Ottomans who once again began blockading key fortresses in Asia Minor. The Ottomans were able to build on their military success due to the numerous divisions amongst their opponents. Many of the peasant classes in Anatolia saw the Ottomans as better masters.

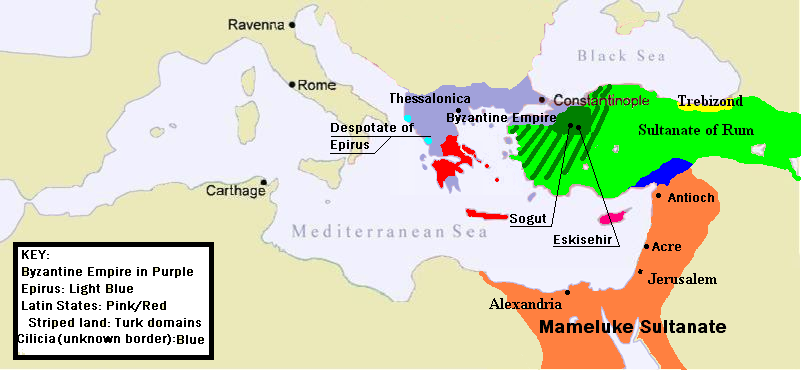
Byzantine Empire at the time of Andronikos III's assumption of power

After these defeats, Andronikos was in no position to send substantial forces. In 1320, Andronikos II's grandson, Andronikos III, was disinherited following the death of his father, Michael IX, the Emperor's son and heir apparent. The following year, Andronikos III retaliated by marching on Constantinople and was given Thrace as an appanage. He kept on pressing for his inheritance and, in 1322, was made co-emperor. This culminated in the Byzantine civil war of 1321–1328, in which Serbia backed Andronikos II and the Bulgarians backed his grandson. Eventually Andronikos III emerged triumphant on May 23, 1328. As Andronikos III consolidated his hold on Byzantium, the Ottomans succeeded in taking Bursa from the Byzantines in 1326.

== Byzantium counter: 1328–1341 ==
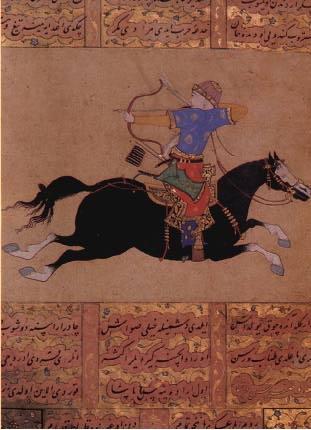
The Ottoman Sultanate operated vast numbers of skilled troops and conscripts.

The fate of Nicaea was sealed when the Byzantine relief army was defeated at Pelekanos on 10 June 1329. In 1331, Nicaea surrendered, resulting in a massive blow due to its strategic position relative to Constantinople.

Once again the Byzantines' military power was depleted and Andronikos III were forced into diplomacy as his grandfather was before him; in return for the safety of the remaining Byzantine settlements in Asia Minor, tribute would be paid to the Ottomans. Unfortunately for the Byzantine Empire, this did not stop the Ottomans from laying siege to Nicomedia in 1333; the city finally fell in 1337. In 1338, the Ottoman leader Orhan Gazi took Skoutarion, giving the Ottomans a base within sight of Constantinople for the first time.

Despite these setbacks, Andronikos III was able to score a few successes against his opponents in mainland Greece and Aegean seas; Thessaly along with Epirus were retaken in 1333 and 1337 respectively. In 1329, the Byzantines recaptured Chios, Phocaea in 1334, and, in 1335, secured Lesbos. Nonetheless, these isolated Islands were isolated exceptions to the general trend of increasing Ottoman conquests. Furthermore, none of the Islands were a part of the Ottoman domain; their capture demonstrates the potential that the Byzantines had at the time of Andronikos III. Byzantine military ability would be further weakened by Serbian expansions into recent acquisitions by Andronikos III (Epirus) and finally by a devastating civil war that would subjugate the Byzantine Empire as a vassal to the Ottomans.

== Balkan invasion and civil war: 1341–1371 ==
The Balkans and Anatolia in 1355. Byzantium has lost her cities in Asia Minor and Macedonia and Epirus have been conquered by Dushan's Serbia, while the nascent Ottoman Beyliks had consolidated its hold over Bithynia

Andronikos III died in 1341 leaving his 10-year-old son John V to rule. A regency was set up with John Cantacuzenus, the young Emperor's mother, Anna of Savoy, and the Patriarch John XIV Kalekas. Rivalries between Kalekas and Cantacuzenus led to a destructive civil war, in which Cantacuzenus emerged triumphant at Constantinople in February 1347. During this time plague, earthquakes and Ottoman raiding continued until only Philadelphia remained in Byzantine hands and only so by payment of a tribute. Throughout the civil war the Byzantines on both sides employed Turks and Serbs with mercenaries pillaging at will, leaving much of Macedonia in ruin and in the hands of the newly created Serbian Empire. Following this victory, Cantacuzenus ruled as co-emperor with John V.

This dual rule eventually failed and the two waged a new civil war further diminishing what was left of Byzantium's integrity in the eyes of her troublesome neighbors. John VI Cantacuzenus emerged triumphant once again and replaced the now exiled John V Palaiologos with his son Matthew Cantacuzenus as junior co-emperor. However, the Turks, under Osman I's son, Orhan I, now came into play by occupying Tzimpe in 1352, before capturing the fort of Kallipolis (Gallipoli) in 1354 and gaining access to the European mainland after captured Chalcedon, the Asiatic suburb of Constantinople in 1353. The arrival of the seemingly unbeatable Ottoman soldiers surrounding Constantinople caused a panic in Constantinople, capitalized by John V who, with the assistance of the Genoese, staged a coup and ousted John VI Cantacuzenus in November 1354. As a result, John VI would later become a monk.

The civil war did not end there; Matthew Cantacuzenus now obtained troops from Orhan and began a bid for taking Constantinople. His capture in 1356 ended his dreams of becoming Emperor and with it came an ephemeral defeat for the Ottomans who had favored the overthrow of John V, Following the end of the civil conflict came a small lull in fighting between the expanding Ottomans and Byzantines. In 1361 Didymoteichon fell to the Turks. Orhan's successor, Murad I was more concerned with his Anatolian positions. However, just like Alp Arslan of the Seljuk Turks, Murad I left the taking of Byzantine territory to his vassals with Philippopolis falling after major campaigning between 1363–64 and Adrianople succumbing to the Ottomans in 1369.

The Byzantine Empire was in no position to launch any decent counter-attack or defense of these lands; by now the Ottomans had become supremely powerful. Murad I crushed an army of Serbians on 26 September 1371 at the Battle of Maritsa leading to the end of Serbian power. The Ottomans were now poised to conquer Constantinople. In an attempt to stave off defeat, John V appealed to the Pope for support offering submission to Rome in return for military support. Despite publicly confessing the Roman Catholic Faith in St. Peter's Basilica, John V received no help. John V therefore was forced to turn to reason with his enemies, the Ottomans. Murad I and John V then came to an agreement whereby Byzantium would provide regular tribute in troops and money in exchange for security.

Crusade from the West planned against Ottoman Empire managed to temporarily recapture Gallipoli in 1366. However, civil war between John V and his son, Andronikos IV allowed Turks to reoccupy it due to the latter's handed it over as payment for Murad's support against the former.

== Byzantine civil war and vassalage: 1371–1394 ==
By now the Ottomans had essentially won the war; Byzantium was reduced to a few settlements other than Constantinople and was forced to recognize its vassal status to the Ottoman Sultan. This vassalage continued until 1394. However, whilst Constantinople had been neutralized, the surrounding Christian powers were still a threat to the Ottomans and Asia Minor was not under complete Ottoman control. The Ottomans continued their thrust into the Balkans, proving to be great conquerors in Europe as they were in Anatolia; in 1385 Sofia was captured from the Bulgarians and Niš was taken the following year. Meanwhile, various smaller states were subjugated as vassals, including the Serbs following the Battle of Kosovo in 1389, much of Bulgaria was taken in 1393 by Bayezid I. By 1396 the Bulgarians had been entirely subjugated when Vidin fell.

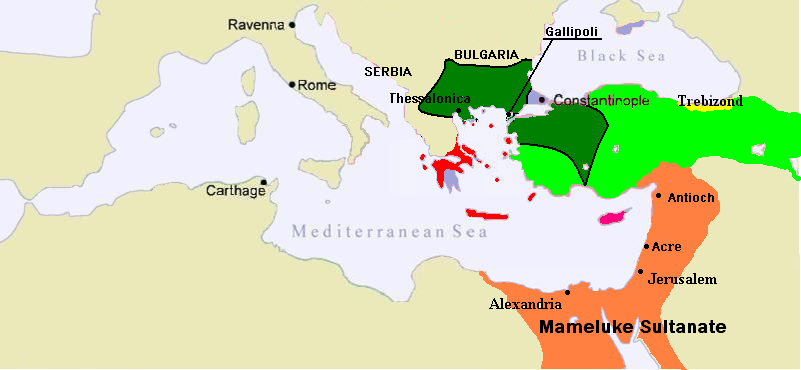
Map of the Middle East c.1389. Byzantium (purple) consists of little other than Constantinople. Following the occupation of Gallipoli, the Ottomans (dark green) rapidly spread across the Balkans, annexing southern parts of Serbia in the northwest and giving them a major advantage over their Turkic (light green) rivals in Anatolia.

Ottoman advances into the Balkans were aided by further Byzantine civil conflict – this time between John V and his eldest son Andronikos IV. With Ottoman aid from Murad I, John V was able to blind Andronikos IV and his son John VII Palaiologos in September 1373. Andronikos escaped with his son and secured Murad's aid by promising a higher tribute than John V's. The civil strife continued as late as September 1390 though potential for conflict continued until 1408. John V eventually forgave Andronikos IV and his son in 1381, angering his second son and heir apparent, Manuel II Palaiologos . He seized Thessalonika, alarming the Ottoman Sultan in liberating parts of Greece from Ottoman rule.

The death of Andronikos IV in 1385 and the capitulation of Thessalonika in 1387 to Hayreddin Pasha encouraged Manuel II Palaiologos to seek the forgiveness of the Sultan and John V. His increasingly close relationship with John V angered John VII who saw his right as the heir threatened. John VII launched a coup against John V but despite Ottoman and Genoese aid his reign lasted mere five months before he was toppled by Manuel II and his father.

In the year 1390, Bayazid I sent a fleet to burn down Chios and the surrounding market towns, Euboea, parts of Attica and the islands of the Archipelago. He destroyed every market town and village from Bithynia to Thrace on the outskirts of Constantinople and deported all the inhabitants.

=== Fall of Philadelphia ===
Whilst the civil war was raging, the Turks in Anatolia took the opportunity to seize Philadelphia in 1390, marking the end of Byzantine rule in Anatolia, although by now the city had long been under only nominal Imperial rule and its fall was of little strategic consequence to the Byzantines.

=== Vassalage ===
Following John V's death, Manuel II Palaiologos was able to secure his throne and establish good relations with the Sultan, becoming his tributary. In return for Ottoman acceptance of his reign Manuel II was forced to dismantle the fortifications at the Golden Gate, something that he did not take lightly to.

== Resumption of hostilities: 1394–1424 ==
In 1394, relations between the Byzantines and the Ottomans changed for the worse and the war between the two resumed when the Ottoman Sultan Bayezid (ruled 1389–1402) ordered the execution of Manuel II, after the Emperor attempted to reconcile with his nephew John VII. The Ottoman Sultan then later changed his decision and demanded that a mosque and a Turkish colony be established in Constantinople. Manuel II not only refused this, he also refused to pay the Sultan tribute and went so far as to ignore the Sultan's messages, leading to a siege of the city in 1394. Manuel II called for a Crusade, which came in 1396. Under the future Holy Roman Emperor Sigismund, the Crusade was routed at Nicopolis in 1396.

The defeat convinced Manuel II to escape the city and travel to Western Europe for aid. During this time the reconciled John VII led the city's successful defense against the Ottomans. The siege was finally broken when Timur of the Chagatai Mongols led an army into Anatolia, dismantling the network of beyliks loyal to the Ottoman Sultan. At the Battle of Ankara, Timur's forces routed Bayezid I's forces, a shocking defeat for which no one was prepared. In the aftermath, the Ottoman Turks began fighting each other led by Bayezid's sons.

The Byzantines wasted no time exploiting the situation and signed a peace treaty with their Christian neighbours and with one of Bayezid's sons. By signing the treaty, they were able to recover Thessalonika and much of the Peloponnese. The Ottoman civil war ended in 1413 when Mehmed I, with the support of the Byzantine Empire, defeated his opponents.

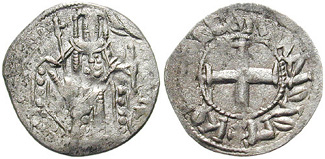
Along with the humiliation, the Byzantine tribute to the Ottomans of 300,000 silver coins would have been all the more difficult with the economy in decline.

The rare amity established between the two states would not last; the death of Mehmed I and the rise of Murad II in 1421 coupled with the ascent of John VIII to the Byzantine throne led to a deteriorated change in relations between the two. Neither leader was content with the status quo. John VIII made the first and foolish move by inciting a rebellion in the Ottoman Empire: a certain Mustafa had been released by the Byzantines and claimed that he was Bayezid's lost son.

Despite the odds, a sizable force had mustered in Europe under his banner, defeating Murad II's subordinates. Murad II's furious reply eventually smashed this upstart and, in 1422, began the Siege of Thessalonika and Constantinople. John VIII then turned to his aging father, Manuel II, for advice. The result was that he incited yet another rebellion in the Ottoman ranks — this time supporting Murad II brother's claim, Kucuk Mustafa. The seemingly promising rebellion had its origins in Asia Minor with Bursa coming under siege. After a failed assault on Constantinople, Murad II was forced to turn back his army and defeat Kucuk. With these defeats, the Byzantines were forced once more into vassalage – 300,000 coins of silver were to be delivered to the Sultan as tribute on an annual basis.

== Ottoman victory: 1424–1453 ==
The Balkans and Anatolia in 1450. By this point all of Byzantium's major cities had fallen to the Ottomans who occupied almost half of Anatolia and most of the Balkans

The Ottomans faced numerous opponents between 1424 and 1453. Tied down by the siege of Thessalonika, the Ottomans had to contend with the Serbs under George Brankovic, the Hungarians under John Hunyadi and the Albanians under George Kastrioti Skanderbeg. This resistance culminated into the Crusade of Varna of 1444, which, despite much local support and deception – a peace treaty was unilaterally revoked by the Hungarians – was defeated. The Crusade of Kosovo in 1448 yielded the same result.

In 1448 and 1451, respectively, there was a change in the Byzantine and Ottoman leaderships: John VIII died and was succeeded by Constantine XI Palaiologos whilst Mehmed II 'the Conqueror' succeeded Murad II. Constantine and Mehmed did not get along well; the former's successful conquests of Crusader territory in the Peloponnese alarmed the latter, who had since subjugated the crusaders in the region as vassals; thus, Mehmed had around 40,000 soldiers sent to nullify these gains. Constantine XI threatened to rebel against Mehmed unless certain conditions were met by the Sultan regarding the status quo. Mehmed responded to these threats by building fortifications in the Bosporus and thus closed Constantinople to outside naval assistance. The Ottomans already controlled the land around Constantinople and so, on 6 April 1453, they began an assault on the city. Despite a union of the Catholic and Orthodox Churches, the Byzantines received no official aid from the Pope or Western Europe, with the exception of a few soldiers from Venice and Genoa.

England and France were in the concluding stages of the Hundred Years War. The French did not wish to lose their advantage in the fight by sending knights and the English were in no position to do so. Spain was in the final stages of the Reconquista. The Holy Roman Empire, never centralized enough behind the Hohenstaufen to unite the principalities, had exhausted what could be spared at Varna. Further fighting among the German princes and the Hussite wars seriously reduced the willingness of most to perform a crusade. Poland and Hungary were key participants at Varna and the defeat there along with the Polish–Teutonic Wars kept them busy and unwilling to make further commitments.

The only other major European powers were the Italian city-states. Genoa and Venice were both enemies of the Ottomans, but also of each other. The Venetians considered sending their fleet up to attack the fortifications guarding the Dardanelles and the Bosporus, thereby relieving the city, but the force was too small and arrived too late. The Ottomans would have overpowered any military assistance provided by one city, even one as large and powerful as the Venetian Republic. In any case some 2,000 mercenaries, mostly Italian under Giovanni Giustiniani Longo, arrived to assist in the defense of the city. The city's entire defense fell to these mercenaries and 5,000 militia soldiers raised from a city whose population had been seriously eroded by heavy taxation, plague and civil conflict. Though poorly trained, the defenders were well armed with many weapons, except for any cannons to match the Ottomans' own artillery.

The city's largest church, the Hagia Sophia, was converted into a mosque. From 1935 to 2020 it served as a museum of Constantinopolitan legacy before being re-converted into a mosque.

The fall of Constantinople came about due to the combined weight of overwhelming odds stacked against the city – outnumbered by more than ten to one, the defenders were overcome by sheer attrition as well as the skill of the Ottoman Janissaries. In an effort to raise morale, the Sultan then made a speech reminding his troops of the vast wealth and pillaging of the city to come. An all-out assault captured the city on May 29, 1453. As the Ottomans fanned out to sack the city, their naval discipline began to collapse and many Genoans and Venetians escaped in vessels from the city, including Niccolò Barbaro, a Venetian surgeon present at the siege who wrote:

All through the day the Turks made a great slaughter of Christians through the city. The blood flowed in the city like rainwater after a sudden storm, and the corpses of Turks and Christians were thrown into the Dardanelles, where they floated out to sea like melons along a canal.

Byzantium's last years saw the loss of recent territories

After the siege, the Ottomans went on to take Morea in 1460, and Trebizond in 1461. With the fall of Trebizond came the end of the Roman Empire; the Palaiologoi continued to be recognized as the rightful emperors of Constantinople by the crowned heads of Europe until the 16th century when the Reformation, the Ottoman threat to Europe and decreased interest in crusading forced European powers to recognize the Ottoman Empire as masters of Balkan, Anatolia, and the Levant. Vestiges of Byzantine legacy in its former sphere ended fully following the Ottoman conquests of the remainder two rump states: Theodoro in 1475 and Epirus (then under the Tocco family) in 1479.

== Causes of the Byzantine defeat ==
=== Latin intervention ===
The Latin presence in the Balkans seriously undermined the Byzantines' ability to coordinate their efforts against the Ottoman Turks. This is exemplified by Michael VIII Palaiologos, whose attempts to drive the Latins out of Greece led to the abandonment of the Anatolian borders which allowed several beyliks, as well as the Turks of Osman I to raid and settle former Byzantine lands. Andronikos II's campaigns in Anatolia, though it obtained some military success, was constantly thwarted by events in the west of the Empire. In any event, the Byzantines were forced to choose between Papal and Latin threat of attack or an unpopular union, which was exploited by numerous rival claimants as cause for a coup against the Byzantine Emperor.

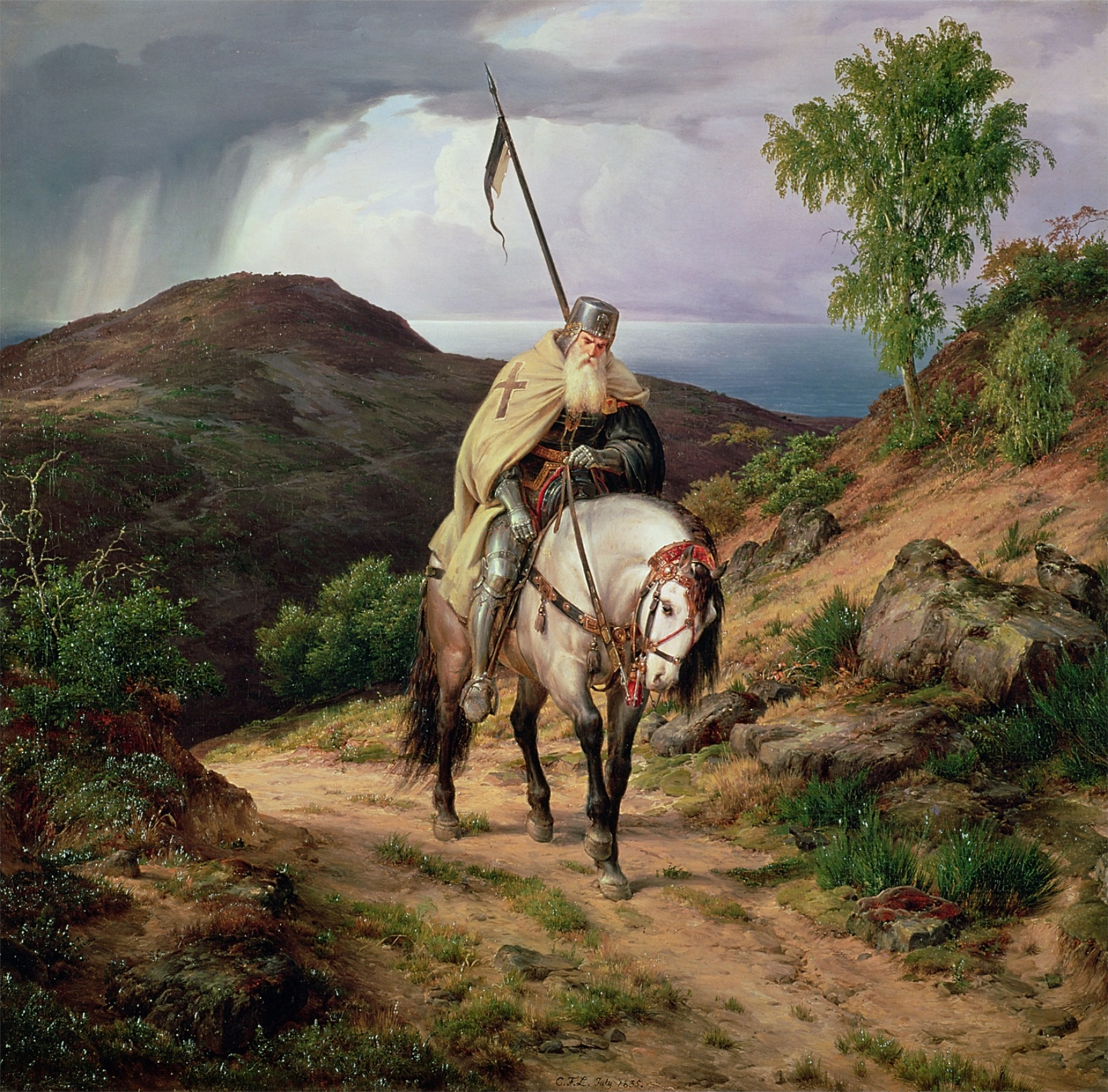
Romantic portrayal of the "Last Crusader". Increasing Muslim victories, Christian defeats and European transgressions coupled with the Reformation and Counter-Reformation led to the end of the Crusades.

Nonetheless, towards the mid and late 14th century, the Byzantines began to receive nominal aid from the West. This was little more than sympathy toward a fellow Christian power fighting a Muslim power and despite two Crusades, the Byzantines "received as much help from Rome as we did from the [Mamluk] sultan [of Egypt]". The Mamluk Sultanate in the 13th century had been one of the most determined powers to remove Christian influence in the Middle East and raiding by Cyprus did not change this in the 14th and 15th centuries.

=== Byzantine weakness ===
Following the Fourth Crusade, the Byzantines were left in an unstable position. The recapture of Constantinople in 1261 and subsequent campaigning against the Latins did not come at a good time – the weakening of the Sultanate of Rum resulted in many beyliks breaking away as autonomous states, such as the upstart Beylik founded by Osman I. This weakening of unified Turkish power gave the revived Byzantine Empire a temporary upper hand, but the new independent beyliks quickly overran Anatolia.

In order to implement these Greek re-conquests, Michael VIII was forced to levy crushing taxes on the Anatolian peasantry in order to pay for the expensive army that modeled around the Komnenian army. This led to much peasant support for the Turks whose system resulted in fewer taxes initially.

After Michael VIII's death, the Byzantines suffered from constant civil strife early on. The Ottomans suffered civil conflict as well, but this occurred much later on in the 15th century; by that time, the Byzantines were too weak to reconquer much territory. This is in contrast to the civil strife of Byzantium, occurring at a time (1341–1371) when the Ottomans were crossing into Europe through a devastated Gallipoli and surrounding the city, thus sealing its fate as a vassal. When attempts were made to break this vassalage, the Byzantines found themselves out-matched and at the mercy of Latin assistance, which despite two Crusades, ultimately amounted to nothing.

=== Ottoman Advantages ===
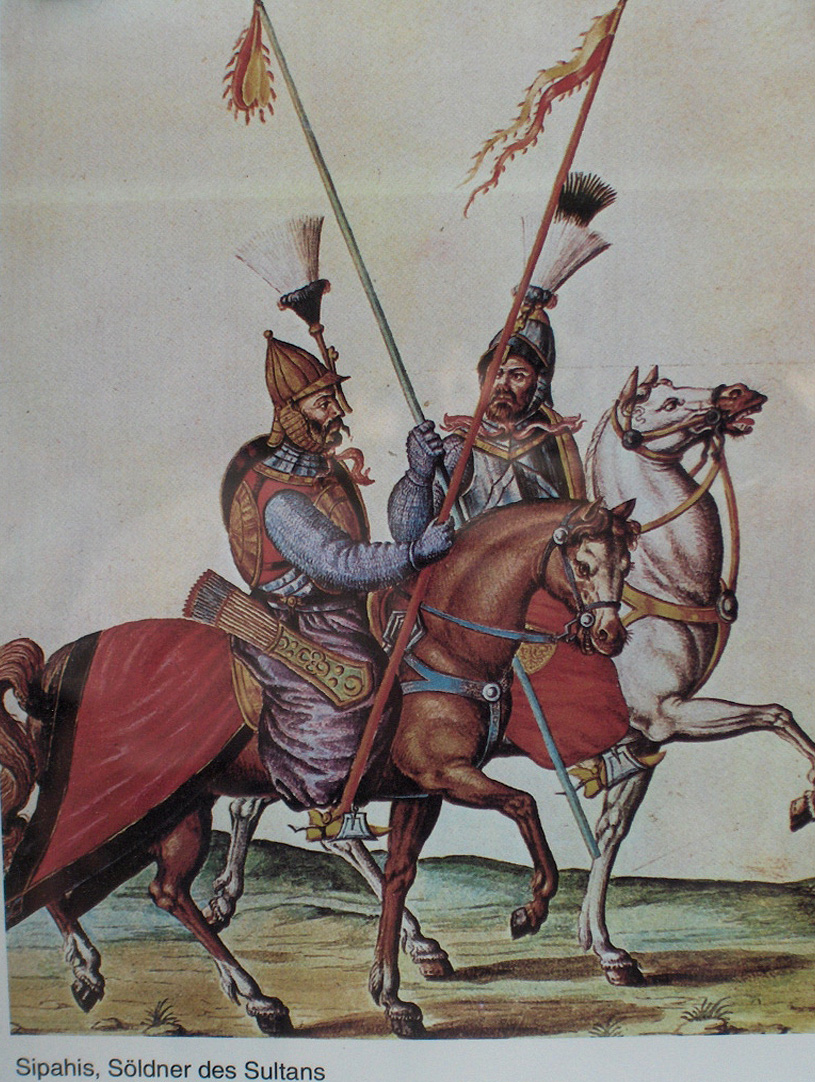
The Ottomans combined several different fighting methods and technologies. These Sipahis were exactly unique for western knights due to their weapons and battlefield experiments.

Ottoman rule was auspicious to the Anatolian commoner due to the aforementioned Byzantine taxes. Thus, they were able to levy vast numbers of willing troops. Initially, their raiding gave them great support from other Turks near Osman's small domain. In time however, as the Turks began to settle in land formerly held by the overextended Byzantines, they were able to exploit the hardships of the peasant classes by recruiting their aid. Those that did not assist the Ottomans were raided themselves. Eventually, the cities in Asia Minor, isolated from the much more administrated cities of the western half of the Byzantine Empire, surrendered. During their conquests, the Ottomans were able to acquire a thorough grasp on the art of siege warfare due to a majority of those cities being walled.

It was the Ottoman's laissez faire method of administrating new conquests that allowed them to expand so quickly. As opposed to the heavily centralized Byzantine method of governance, the Ottomans would subjugate their opponents as vassals rather than destroy them, otherwise they would have exhausted themselves in the process. The exacting of tribute from conquered states in the form of children and money was effective in forcing subjugation over conquest. Coupled with this, the entire region was composed of disparate states (Bulgaria, Serbia, Latin states) who would just as soon fight each other as the Ottomans and realized too late that the Ottoman forces defeated them by integrating them in a network of subordinate states.

== Consequences ==
The Fall of Constantinople came as a shock to the papacy, which ordered an immediate counter-attack in the form of a crusade. Only Philip the Good, Duke of Burgundy responded but under the condition that a powerful monarch assist him; however, none would do so. Pope Pius II then ordered another crusade. Again, no substantial efforts were seen by any of Europe's major leaders of the time. This forced the Pope himself to lead a crusade. His death in 1464 led to the disbanding of the crusade at the port of Ancona.

The fall also had many implications in Europe: the influx of Greek science and culture into Europe by those escaping the Ottomans was a crucial factor in catalyzing the European Renaissance.

The failed attempts at defeating the Ottomans at Nicopolis and Varna, the loss of the Holy Land (without Byzantium the Crusades could not re-supply en route) and the lack of a genuine counter-attack led many, including Martin Luther, into believing that the Turks were God's punishment against the sins of Christians:

How shamefully ... the pope has this long time baited us with the war against the Turks, taken our money, destroyed so many Christians and made so much mischief!

Nonetheless, by 1529, Europe began to rise to the threat of the Ottomans. Martin Luther, changing his views, wrote that the "Scourge of God" had to be fought with great vigour by secular leaders rather than as Crusades initiated by the papacy.

With the Ottomans' hold on Constantinople de facto recognized by Europe's lack of action, the Ottomans went on to facilitate further conquests in Europe and in the Middle East. Their power finally reached a peak in the mid 17th century. Their success through the Janissaries became their new weakness; due to their conservativism and power, Ottoman reform was difficult to implement whilst European armies became increasingly more resourceful and modernized. As a result, Russian and Austrian attempts to contain the Ottoman threat became more and more a formality until the official dissolution of the Empire after World War I.

== See also ==
- Ottoman Navy
- Arab–Byzantine wars
- Byzantine–Seljuq wars
- List of conflicts in the Middle East
- Ottoman claim to Roman succession
