= Capture of Gallipoli (1354) =

14th century battle between the Byzantine Empire and the Ottoman Empire

Coordinates: 40.4133°N 26.6711°E

Fall of Gallipoli
- Part of the Byzantine–Ottoman wars
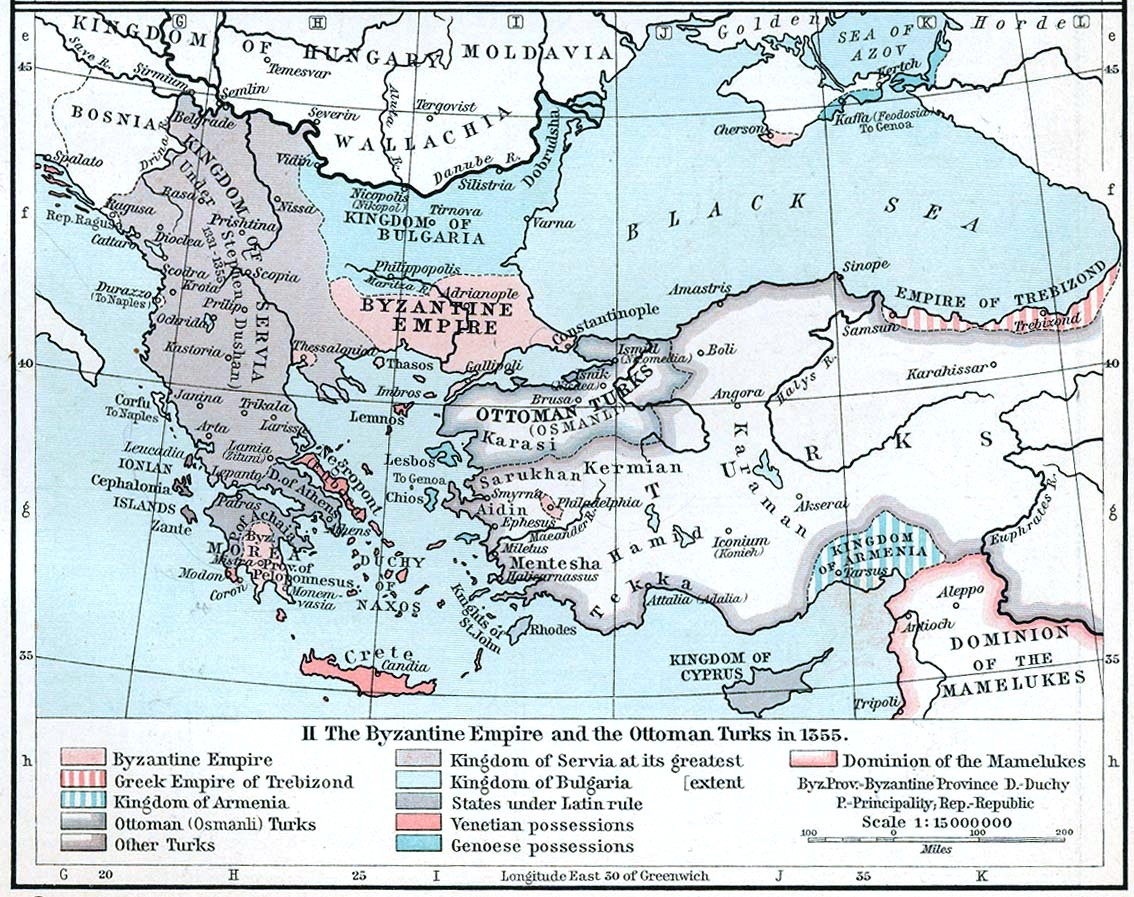
- The Byzantine and Ottoman Empires within a year of the occupation of Gallipoli
Date	March 1354
Location	Gallipoli peninsula
Result	Ottoman victory

Belligerents
Byzantine Empire	(Ottoman Empire) Ottoman Beylik

Commanders and leaders
unknown	(Ottoman Empire) Süleyman Pasha

Strength
Unknown	10,000–20,000 exmercenaries

The fall of Gallipoli (Turkish: Gelibolu'nun Fethi, lit. 'Conquest of Gelibolu') was the siege and capture of the Gallipoli fortress and peninsula, by the Ottoman Turks, in March 1354. After suffering a half-century of defeats at the hands of the Ottomans, the Byzantine Empire had lost nearly all of its possessions in Anatolia, except Philadelphia. Access to the Aegean and Marmara seas meant that the Ottomans could now implement the conquest of the southern Balkans, and could advance further north into the Serbian Empire and Hungary.

== Conquest ==
During the Byzantine civil war of 1352–57, Turkish mercenaries allied with the emperor John VI Kantakouzenos plundered most of Byzantine Thrace and, around 1352, were granted the small fortress of Tzympe near Gallipoli. On 2 March 1354, the area was struck by an earthquake that destroyed hundreds of villages and towns in the area. Nearly every building in Gallipoli was destroyed, causing the Greek inhabitants to evacuate the city. Within a month, Süleyman Pasha seized the site, quickly fortifying it and populating it with Turkish families brought over from Anatolia.

== Aftermath ==
John VI offered cash payments to the Ottoman sultan Orhan to vacate the city, but was refused. The sultan reportedly said he had not taken the city by force and could not give up something which had been "granted to him by Allah". Panic spread throughout Constantinople as many believed that the Turks would soon be coming for the city itself. Because of this, Kantakouzenos's position became unstable, and he was overthrown in November 1354.

Gallipoli was to become the major bridgehead into Europe through which the Ottomans would facilitate further expansion into Europe. The Turks launched campaigns throughout the countryside and within less than ten years, nearly all of Byzantine Thrace fell to the Turks, including Adrianople.
