= Siege of Thessalonica (1383–1387) =

Siege of the Byzantine-Ottoman wars

- Part of the Byzantine–Ottoman wars
Date	October 1383 – 9 April 1387
Location	Thessaloniki
Result	Ottoman victory

Belligerents
Byzantine Empire	Ottoman Empire

Commanders and leaders
(Byzantine Empire) Manuel II Palaiologos	(Ottoman Empire) Halil Pasha

Strength
Unknown	Unknown

Casualties and losses
Unknown	Unknown

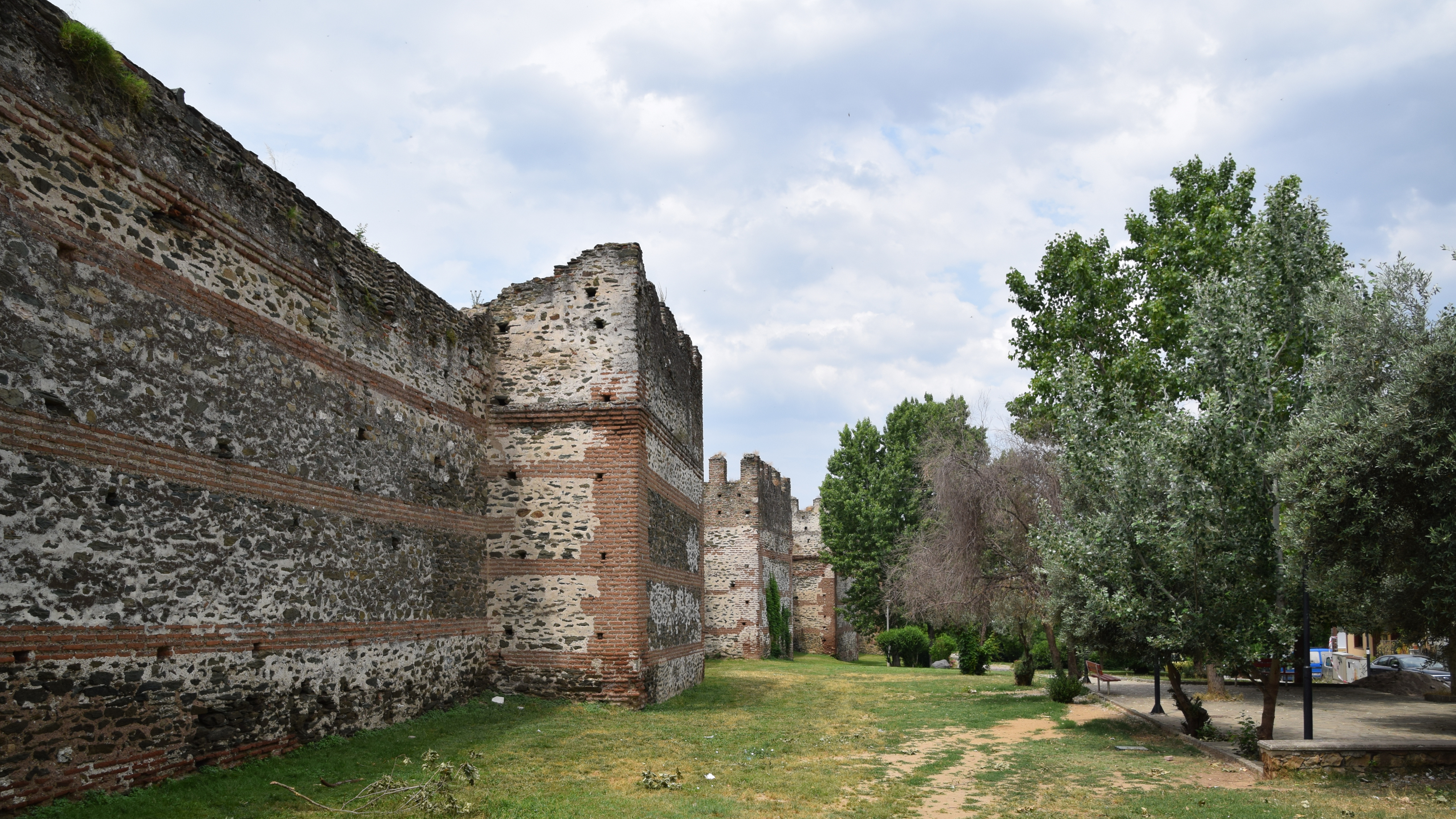
Fortification wall in Thessaloniki

The first siege of Thessalonica took place between 1383 and 1387 between the Ottoman army dispatched by Murad I and the Byzantine garrison led by Manuel II Palaiologos. After a four-year siege, the city surrendered to the Ottomans.

== Background ==
By the late 14th century, the Ottomans laid their eyes on Thessalonica. The civil war in 1376-1382 weakened the Byzantines, allowing the Ottomans to expand their territories. Manuel II, the son of John V Palaiologos, rebelled against his father and established an independent regime in Thessalonica in November 1382. Manuel ruled from the city as a base for Ottoman resistance. His presence in the city annoyed the Ottoman sultan, Murad I. The Sultan dispatched his general, Khayer al-Din Pasha to attack the city. The city was heavily fortified with access to reinforcements from the sea. The Ottomans captured Serres on September 19, 1383, taking its population as slaves. The Ottomans arrived at the walls of Thessalonica in October.

== Siege ==
The Ottoman general issued an ultimatum to the city; surrender or massacre. Manuel gathered the population of the city to the main square. He exhorted them with a speech to encourage them to resist the Ottomans with all their power and hoped an honorable peace would be established. The population wasn't satisfied with his speech as many of them preferred to surrender to escape pillage and destruction. The Ottoman forces moved from siege to a blockade. The Ottomans lacked naval power to prevent any reinforcements; however, no help arrived although Manuel actively tried to find allies. Another issue Manuel faced, was the uncontrollable inhabitants. Fearing for their lives and commerce, they forced Manuel out of the city on April 6, 1387. Manuel cursed the inhabitants for their cowardice. Three days later, the gates were opened to the Ottomans, and the population was spared from any pillaging.

== Aftermath ==
The city was granted special privileges in exchange for a tax and an installment of a small garrison. Manuel later fell into Ottoman custody. Following the death of Emperor John V Palaiologos in 1391, however, Manuel II escaped Ottoman custody and went to Constantinople, where he was crowned emperor, succeeding his father. This angered Sultan Bayezid I, who laid waste to the remaining Byzantine territories of western Thrace. Thessalonica too submitted again to Ottoman rule at this time, possibly after a brief resistance, but was treated more leniently: although the city was brought under complete Ottoman control, the Christian population and the Church kept most of their possessions and rights, and the city retained its institutions.

== Sources ==
- Clifford J. Rogers (2010), The Oxford Encyclopedia of Medieval Warfare and Military Technology. Vol I.
- John Julius Norwich (1997), A Short History of Byzantium.
- Donald M. Nicol (1993), The Last Centuries of Byzantium, 1261–1453.
