= Çimpe Castle =

Medieval castle in Gallipoli, modern-day Turkey

Coordinates: 40°29′44.89″N 26°44′4.51″E

Çimpe Castle (Ottoman Turkish: جنبی, Cinbi; Greek: Τζύμπη, Tzympē) was a medieval fortification on the Gallipoli peninsula in modern Turkey. Its site is located along the Istanbul Caddesi between Bolayir and Gallipoli, commanding the narrowest point on the peninsula.

Erected by the Byzantines as Tzympe, Çimpe Castle is traditionally held to have fallen during a moonlight attack in 1356, to Suleyman Pasha and a company of thirty nine selected raiders. However, modern scholarship holds that it was granted to the Ottoman Turks by the Byzantine emperor John Kantakouzenos around 1352 for their use during his war against his erstwhile charge and co-emperor John Palaiologos. A major earthquake in 1354 then permitted Suleyman's forces to move from Çimpe to the far more important stronghold of Kallipolis (Gallipoli, modern Gelibolu), which they quickly rebuilt and fortified.

Although the medieval castle no longer stands, its position remained important. The same narrow stretch it commanded — the "Lines of Bulair" — was fortified by the French and English during the Crimean War; the Turkish X Corps during the First Balkan War; and the Turkish 5th Army during the Gallipoli Campaign in World War I.

== See also ==
- Fall of Gallipoli
- Battle of Bulair
- Gallipoli Campaign
