= Vardariotai =

Ethnicity in the Byzantine Empire

The Vardariotai (Byzantine Greek: Βαρδαριῶται, romanized: Bardariôtai, pronounced [var.ða.riˈo.te]), sometimes Anglicized as Vardariots, were an ethnic and territorial group (probably originally of Cuman and Pecheneg origin) in the later Byzantine Empire, which provided a palace guard regiment during the twelfth and thirteenth centuries.

== History ==
The exact origin and nature of the Vardariotai is uncertain. The name first appears in the tenth century, when a bishopric of the "Vardariotai or Tourkoi" is mentioned as subject to the diocese of Thessalonica. The mid-fourteenth century writer Pseudo-Kodinos calls them "Persians" by race (a typical Byzantine anachronism for "Turks"), and recalls that they were settled in the Vardar river valley by an unnamed Byzantine emperor of old. In both cases, however, "Turks" probably implies the Cumans and Pechenegs, who were called "Tourkoi" by the Byzantines in the tenth–eleventh centuries. Hence it seems that the Vardariotai were Cumans and Pechenegs resettled in Macedonia in the tenth century, and that they had become Christians by the end of that century.

By the twelfth century, the Vardariotai, their Cuman and Pecheneg identity by now much diluted, were being recruited into the Byzantine army, and, at the latest during the latter part of the reign of Emperor Manuel I Komnenos (r. 1143–1180), they were formed into a distinct palace guard regiment. Their functions, however, at least in the Palaiologan period, appear to have been more those of a police force than a military unit: Pseudo-Kodinos lists them not with the guards, but with the unarmed palace personnel, and states that their duty was "to keep people orderly" during ceremonies. Unlike the armed members of the Varangian Guard and the Paramonai regiment, they were equipped only with a whip (the manglabion) and a staff (the dekanikion). Kodinos also records that they wore distinctive red uniforms and a "Persian" hat called angouroton (lit. 'cucumber-shaped'), and that the whip, hanging at their belt, was their symbol. This latter reference has led to the hypothesis that the Vardariotai were the replacement of the older Manglabites guards corps. They were commanded by a primikerios, first attested in the year 1166. The thirteenth-century historian George Akropolites further states that the Vardariotai accompanied the Byzantine emperor to his military camp whilst on campaign.

It is unclear whether and how the vardarioi, administrative officials of Thessalonica in the tenth–eleventh centuries, known through their seals, are related to the Vardariotai.

== See also ==
- Komnenian Byzantine army
- Palaiologan Byzantine army

== Sources ==
- Bartusis, Mark C. (1997). The Late Byzantine Army: Arms and Society 1204–1453. Philadelphia: University of Pennsylvania Press. ISBN 0-8122-1620-2.
- Kazhdan, Alexander (1991). "Vardariotai". In Kazhdan, Alexander (ed.). The Oxford Dictionary of Byzantium. Oxford and New York: Oxford University Press. p. 2153. ISBN 0-19-504652-8.
- Macrides, Ruth (2007). George Akropolites: The History – Introduction, Translation and Commentary. Oxford: Oxford University Press. ISBN 978-0-19-921067-1.
- Magdalino, Paul (2002) [1993]. The Empire of Manuel I Komnenos, 1143–1180. Cambridge: Cambridge University Press. ISBN 0-521-52653-1.
