= Byzantine army (Palaiologan era) =

Byzantine military from the late 13th to 15th centuries

Byzantine army of the Palaiologan period
- Imperial flag (basilikon phlamoulon)
- Leader: Byzantine Emperor
- Dates active: 1261–1453
- Headquarters: Constantinople
- Active regions: Bithynia, western Anatolia, Thrace, Morea, Macedonia, Epirus.
- Size: 20,000 troops (1279).
- Part of: Byzantine Empire
- Wars: the Byzantine-Ottoman wars, the Byzantine-Serbian Wars and other conflicts

The Palaiologan army refers to the military forces of the Byzantine Empire under the rule of the Palaiologos dynasty, from the late 13th century to its final collapse in the mid-15th century. The army was a direct continuation of the forces of the Empire of Nicaea, which itself was a fractured component of the formidable Komnenian army of the 12th century. Under the first Palaiologan emperor, Michael VIII, the army's role took an increasingly offensive role whilst the naval forces of the empire, weakened since the days of Andronikos I Komnenos, were boosted to include thousands of skilled sailors and some 80 ships. Due to the lack of land to support the army, the empire required the use of large numbers of mercenaries.

After Andronikos II took to the throne in 1282, the army fell apart and the Byzantines suffered regular defeats at the hands of their eastern opponents, although they would continue to enjoy success against the Latin territories in Greece. By c. 1350 the Empire's inefficient fiscal organization and incompetent central government made raising troops and the supplies to maintain them a near-impossible task, and the Empire came to rely upon troops provided by Serbs, Bulgarians, Venetians, Latins, Genoese and Turks to fight the civil wars that lasted for the greater part of the 14th century, with the latter foe being the most successful in establishing a foothold in Thrace. By the time the civil war had ended, the Turks had cut off Constantinople, the capital of the Byzantine Empire, from the surrounding land and in 1453 the last decisive battle was fought by the Palaiologan army when the capital was stormed and sacked, falling on 29 May.

== Structure of the army ==
=== Size and organization ===
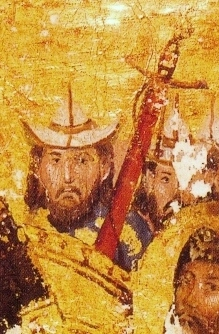
Sword bearer of John Kantakouzenos

The Byzantine army continued to use the same military terms with regards to numbers of troops and officers as did the Komnenian army. However, there were fewer territories to raise troops from. In Anatolia, the local support for the Ottoman conquerors grew daily, whilst in Greece the ravaging by the Crusader states, by Serbia, by Bulgaria, and earlier on by the Angevin Empire ended the region's prominence as a source of Byzantine levies. After 1204, no single Byzantine field army numbered more than 5,000 men. Around 1261, the central army consisted of 6,000 men, while the number of total field troops never exceeded 10,000 men. The total number of troops under Michael VIII was about 20,000 men; the mobile force numbered 15,000 men, while the town garrisons totaled 5,000 men. However, under Andronicus II the more professional elements of the army was demobilized in favor of poorly trained and cheaper militia soldiers. The Emperor decreased the entire army's strength to 4,000 men by 1320, and a year later the Empire's standing army dropped to only 3,000 cavalry. Even though the Empire had shrunk considerably by the time of Andronicus III's reign, he succeeded in assembling an army of 4,000 men for his campaign against the Ottomans. By 1453, the Byzantine army had fallen to a regular garrison of 1,500 men in Constantinople. With a supreme effort, Constantine XI succeeded in assembling a garrison of 7,000 men (included 2,000 foreigners) to defend the city against the Ottoman army.

Byzantine troops continued to consist of cavalry, infantry and archers. Since Trebizond had broken away, Cumans and Turks were used for cavalry and missile units. In the Palaiologan era, the main term for a standing regiment was the allagion.

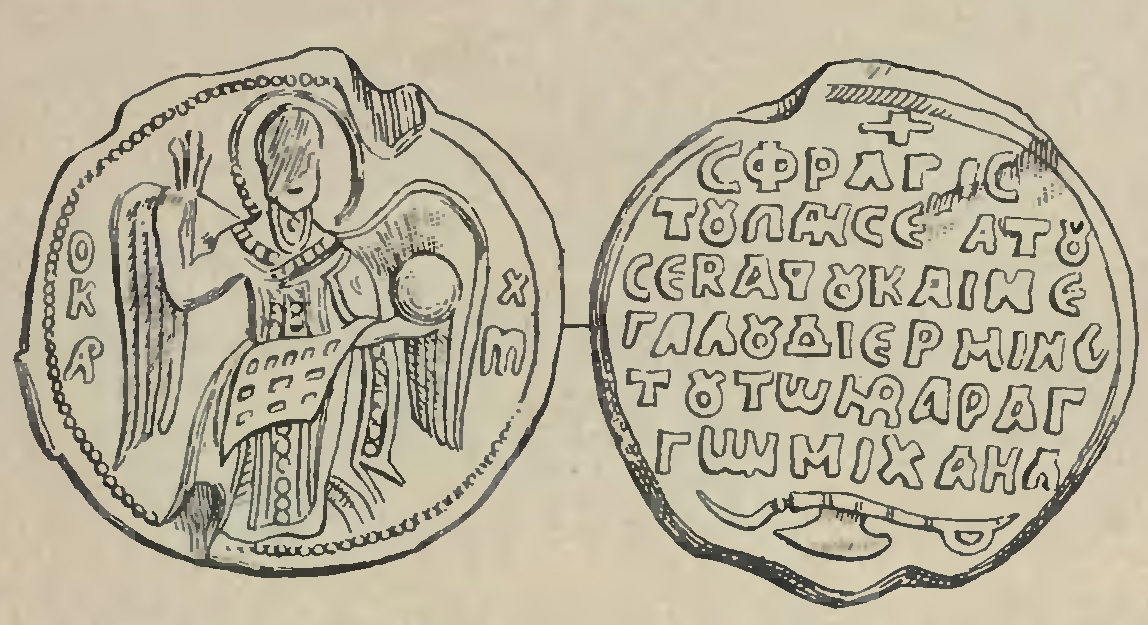
Seal of a certain Michael, the "grand interpreter of the Varangians". Dating to c. 1261–1400.

Palace and imperial guard units included the Varangian Guard, the Paramonai, Mourtatoi, Tzakones and Vardariotai. The Varangians, also often referred to as "axe-bearers", were the most prominent and probably most numerous. Founded in the 11th century they initially consisted of Scandinavians, although Englishmen soon came to dominate. By 1204 they numbered up to 5.000 men. After 1204 some Varangians served the Latin Emperor, while there is little evidence for Varangians in the Nicaean Empire until the mid-13th century. By the Palaiologan reconquest of Constantinople they were well-established. Unlike in the past they did not participate in open battles, but served as personal guards of the emperors, the imperial treasure as well as prisons. They are attested as late as the turn of the 15th century, with the last possible mention dating to 1404. The Paramonai are an obscure division of native origin only attested in the 13th and early 14th centuries, apparently being divided into a mounted and a dismounted division. The Mourtatoi, the offspring of Turkish and Greek intermarriages, fought as dismounted archers and were not exclusively palace guards. The Tzakones were lightly armed troops partially recruited from Morea that also served as marines. Finally, the Vardariotai had a policing function rather than being an actually military unit.

=== Mercenaries ===
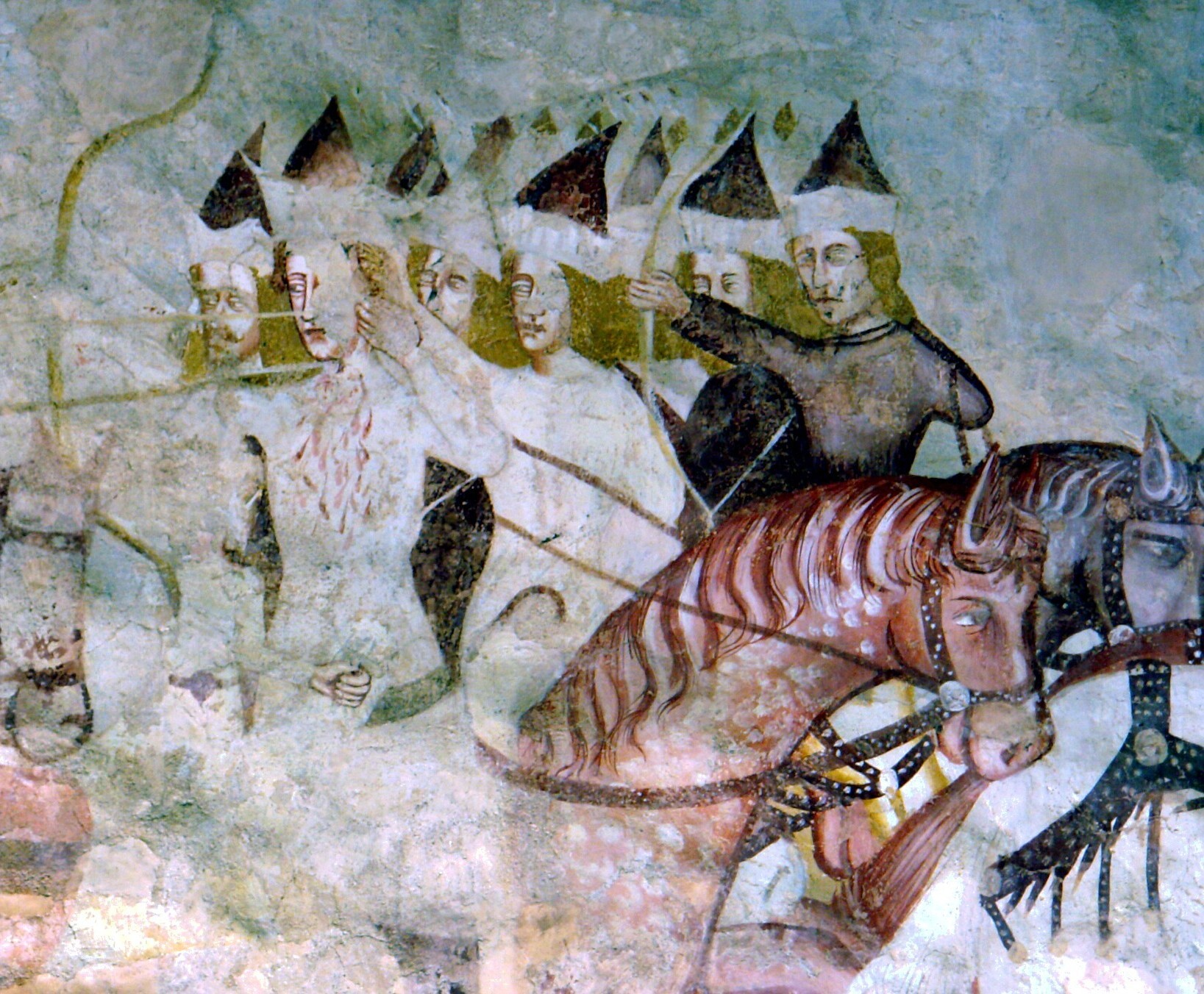
Cuman mercenaries were commonly deployed during the 13th and early 14th centuries. Kraskovo church in Slovakia, 14th century

After Constantinople was retaken, Michael VIII army's continuous campaigning in Greece ensured that the Nicaean army, an offshoot of the expensive but effective Komnenian army remained in play. Under Andronicus II however, the army was reduced to destructively low numbers – mercenary troops were disbanded to save money and to lower taxes upon the disgruntled population. Instead the use of poorly equipped and ill-disciplined militia soldiers saw the replacement of the vitally important expert soldiers. The results were obvious; Byzantine losses in Asia Minor occurred primarily under Andronicus II.

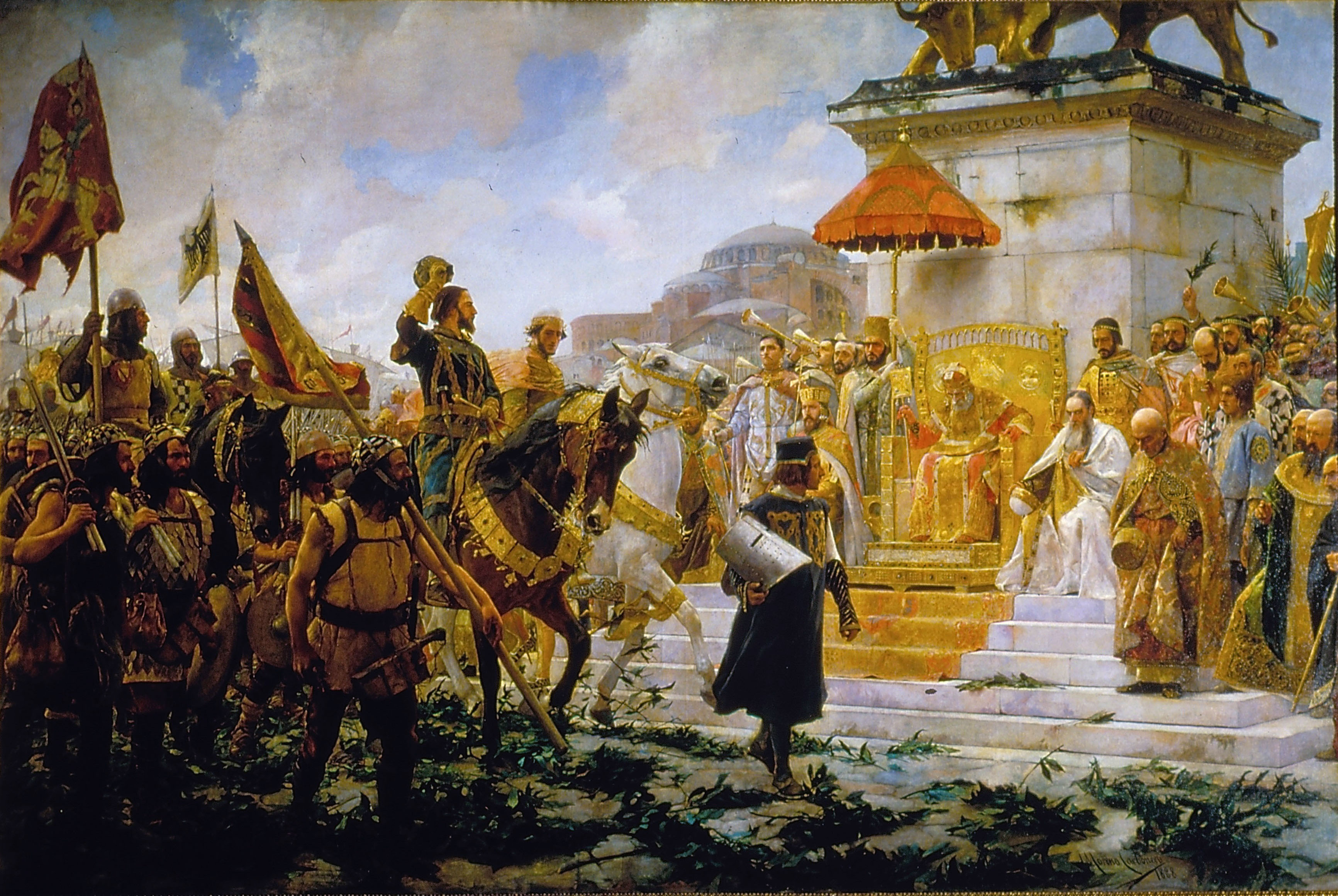
Roger de Flor and his Catalan Company enter the service of Andronikos II. Painting by José Moreno Carbonero, 1888

In 1302 the center of military expenditure shifted back again towards mercenaries, notably the Catalan Company, but after their leader was murdered the company returned to Thrace and Greece where they overthrew the Crusader Duchy of Athens and seriously undermined Greek rule so that on both sides of the Bosporus the Empire suffered. Even so, mercenaries continued to be used after Andronicus II's reign. Ironically Andronicus' successor's policy of using many foreign fighters worsened Byzantium's fortunes in the same way that Andronicus had done so with their disbandment. The use of Serbs, Bulgarians and Turks of Aydın and of the Ottomans opened Byzantium up to more foreign incursions. The deployment of up to 20,000 Turkish soldiers from the Ottoman realm to assist her nominal Greek ally only eased future conquests of the area.

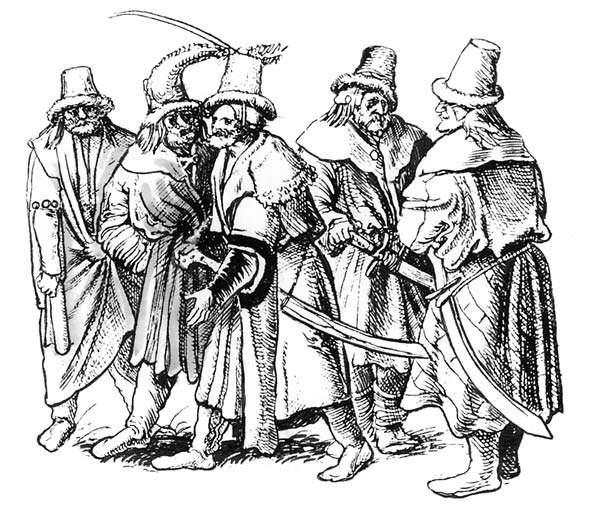
A band of Stratioti, c. 1513

Since Byzantium became increasingly incapable in raising a "loyal" Greek army, foreigners such as the Knights of Rhodes, Venetians, Genoans and Italians were added to Byzantium's fighting forces. Since the Imperial treasury was bankrupt after c 1350, these foreign fighters fought only for political reasons and often in civil wars, rather than to strengthen Byzantium's position.

From about the mid-14th and especially the turn of the 15th century Albanian migrants began to enter the Morea. This migration was encouraged by the Despots themselves, who settled the Albanians as smallholders in depopulated areas. They were recruited as light cavalry called stratiots (stratiōtai) who, by the 15th century, numbered several thousand men. They were organized in small bands and were used for infiltration or skirmishing operations. After the collapse of the Despotate many stratiots, now composed of both Albanians and Greeks, were employed by Venice.

== Strategy and tactics ==
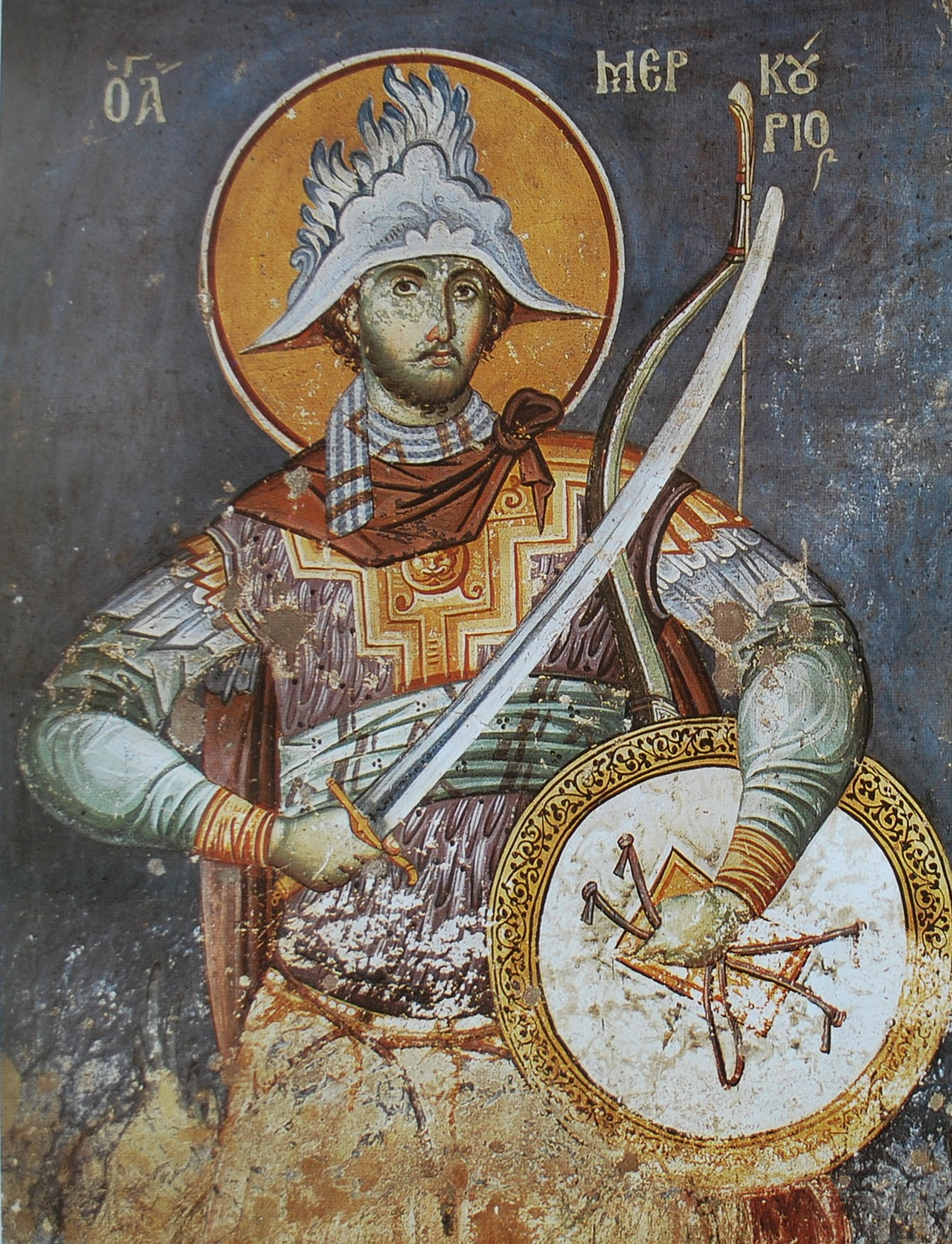
Painting of St. Mercurios, Protaton in Karyes (early 14th century)

The Byzantine Empire's main strategy aimed to make maximum use of an often outnumbered army. The key behind this approach was the use of border fortifications that would impede an invading force long enough for the main Imperial army to march in to its relief. One example of this occurred on May 1281 when Tarchaneiotes was sent by Michael VIII to relieve the fort town of Berat, and succeeded in driving Charles of the House of the Angevins away. Nonetheless, this strategy was not in touch with the military situation of the day – forts and castles became increasingly less useful for defense and more so as a residence. In particular were Crusader forts, Byzantiums' major opponent in the west. These forts played little role in helping the Crusaders hold on to their territories and the battle was often decided on an open field; the castle of Thebes was lost twice, first by Crusaders and then by the Catalans in 20 years without a siege. What may have contributed to the relegation of castles in war was that the Crusaders in Greece were desperately short of manpower and therefore the destruction of their army on the field left their castles defenceless – as was seen in Constantinople in 1261, where only a skeleton force was left to defend the Capital due to the Latin Empire's lack of manpower.

Reconnaissance and ambushing enemy columns remained a favorite Byzantine tactic. At the Battle of Pelekanos, the Ottomans were successfully spied upon by the opposing Byzantine troops. Prudence remained an admirable virtue (as can be seen by John Cantacuzenus' advice to withdraw from Pelekanos).

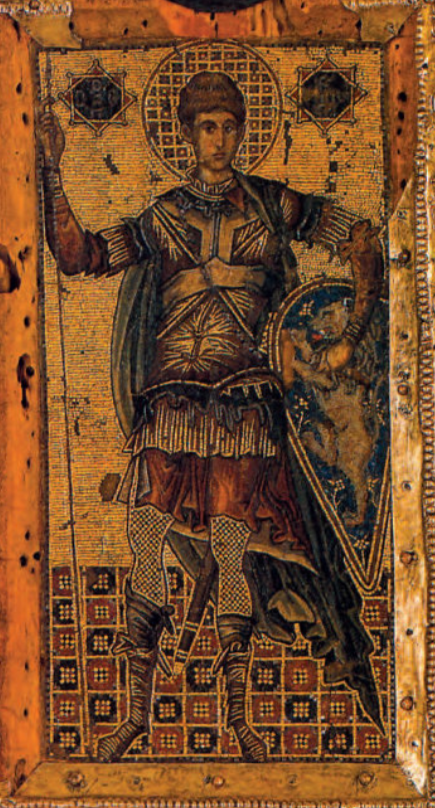
Icon of St. Demetrius depicting him with archaizing armour and a kite shield (14th century)

More serious shortcomings in Byzantine strategy occurred in Asia Minor, particularly against the Ottoman Turks who would raid Byzantine lands and then retreat before any serious resistance could counter. The local population endured heavy burdens in providing officials with food and matériel, but such burdens were too difficult to bear, as the ravages of warfare were brought home by the Ottomans and their ghazi followers. At Magnesia, Nicomedia and Pelekanos the Byzantines suffered serious defeats at the hands of the Turks; since there were few troops to spare, the Empire was brought one step closer to peril with each defeat. After the Imperial army suffered defeat in Asia Minor, Andronikos III saw Anatolia as a lost cause and began reorganizing the Byzantine fleet; as a result the Aegean remained an effective defense against Turkish incursions until Gallipoli was at last captured by the Turks in 1354. From then on, the Byzantine military engaged in small scale warfare against its weak Crusader opponents, mixing in diplomacy and subterfuge, often exploiting civil conflict amongst their Ottoman opponents. In the Peloponnese, territory continued to be re-conquered by the Byzantines against the weak crusaders until the mid 15th century, when the Byzantine enclave in Morea was finally conquered by the Ottomans.

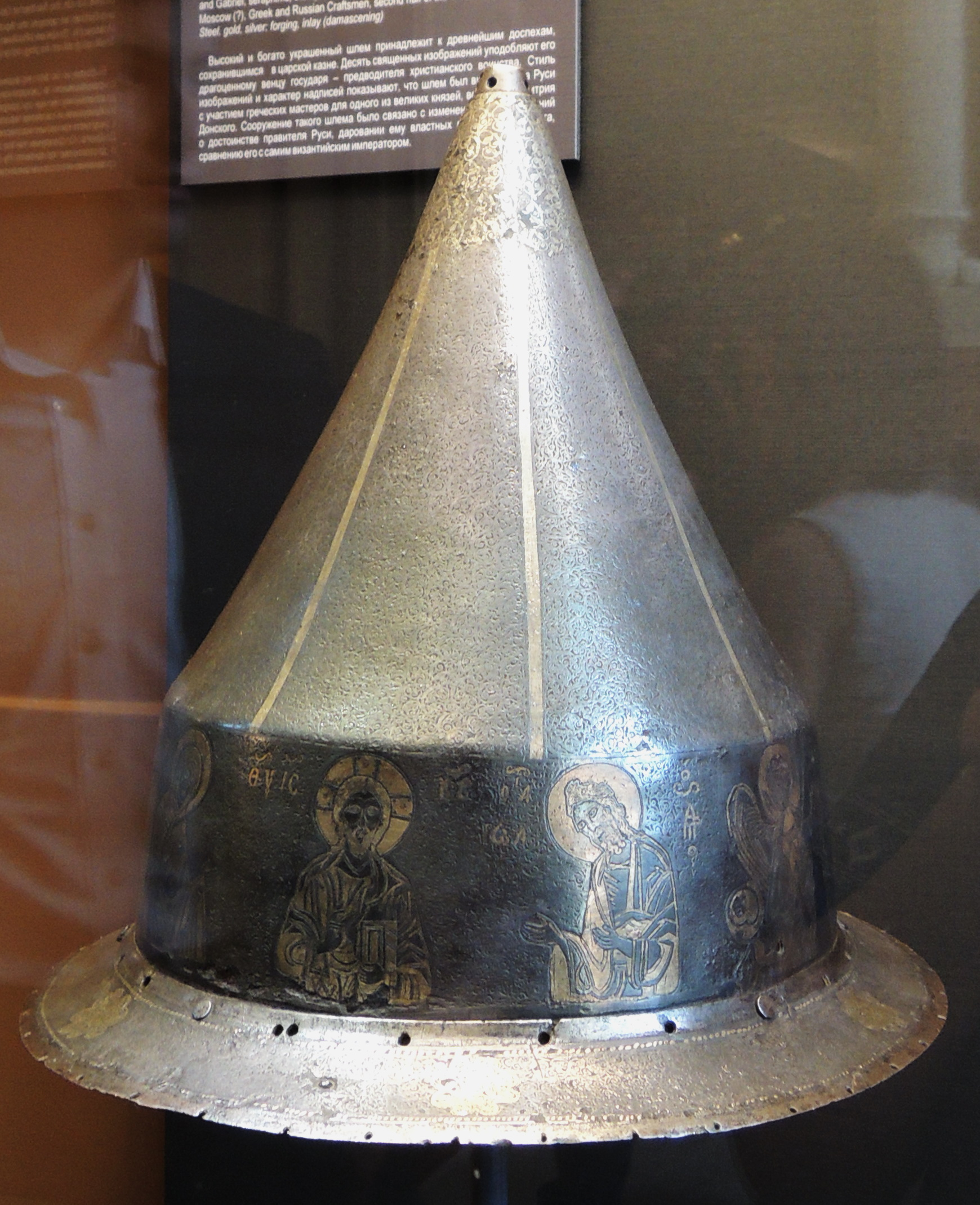
Kettle hat of Byzantine provenance, late 13th–14th century. Now in the Kremlin Armoury.

=== Alliance with the Mongols ===
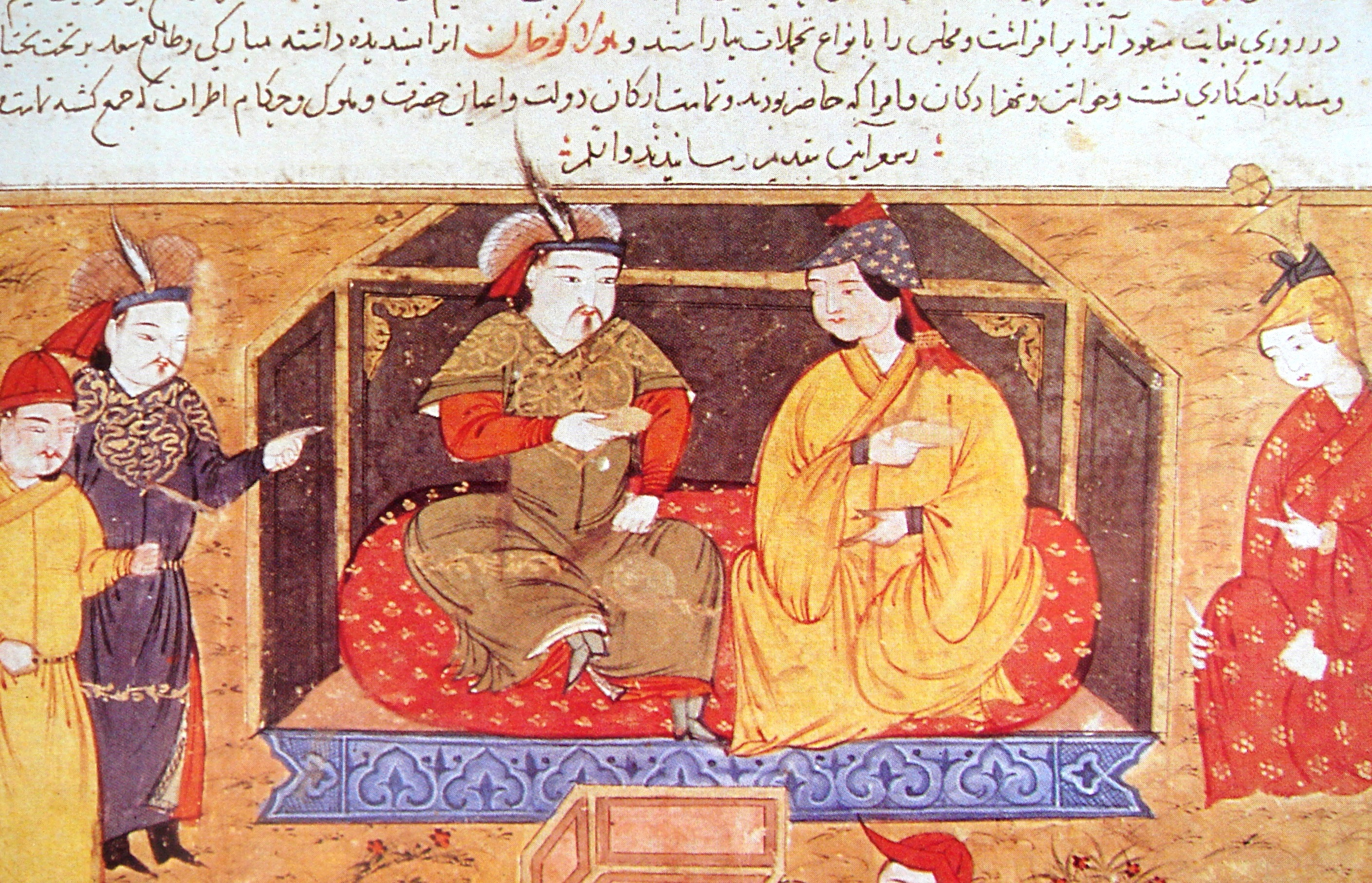
Hulagu, founder of the Ilkhanid dynasty; Byzantium's ally in the early 14th century.

Until 1269 the Turks conquered the southern coast of the theme of Mylasa and Melanoudion in Caria as far west as the Cnidian Peninsula, while the northern part of the theme likely followed soon after. This territory eventually came to constitute the Beylik of Menteshe. Around the same time the Turks also encroached on the port towns of Paphlagonia.

Michael VIII Palaiologos was anxious to establish an alliance with the Mongols, who themselves were highly favourable to Christianity, many of them being Nestorian Christians. He signed a treaty in 1263 with the Mongol Khan of the Golden Horde, and he married two of his daughters (conceived through a mistress, a Diplovatatzina) to Mongol kings: Euphrosyne Palaiologina, who married Nogai Khan of the Golden Horde, and Maria Palaiologina, who married Abaqa Khan of Ilkhanid Persia. In 1282, Nogai Khan provided Michael VIII with 4,000 Mongols whom he sent against Thessaly. His alliance with the Mongols would also benefit his son Andronicus II; in 1305 Ilkhan Oljeitu promised Andronicus II 40,000 men, and in 1308 dispatched 30,000 men to recover many Byzantine towns in Bithynia.

=== Weapons ===
Weapons amongst the Byzantine army varied greatly, as did the composition of the army. Shields and spears were as always the most common weapon.

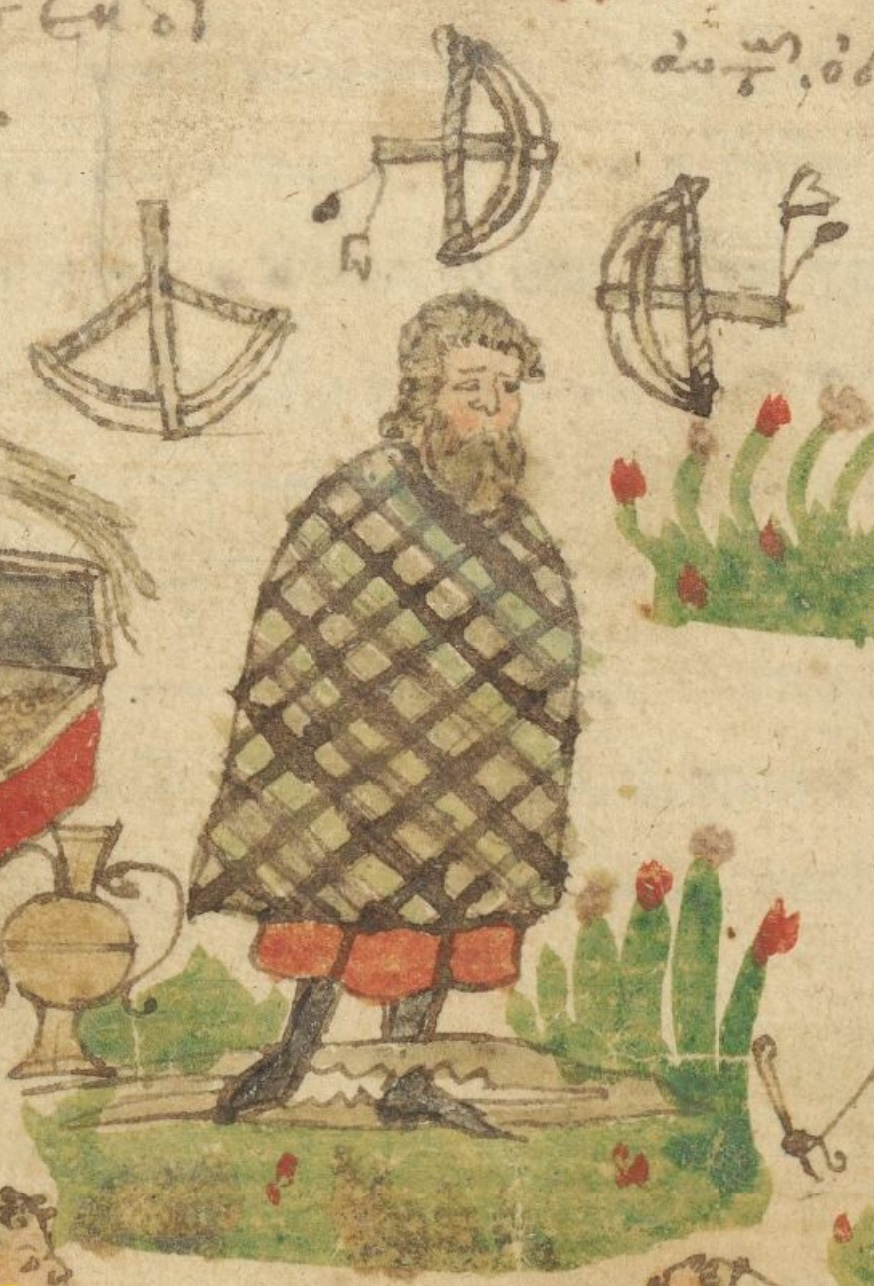
Three crossbows as depicted in a book illumination from Morea, 1362

The crossbow was adopted by the Byzantine infantry in the 13th century, although the Cypriote rebel Isaac Komnenos is recorded to have used crossbowmen as early as 1191. 13 years later they were used during the defense of Constantinople. Associated primarily with western Europeans, the crossbow or tzangra remained of secondary relevance and was mostly restricted to naval combat and sieges. Soldiers wielding this weapon were known as tzangratoroi. Despite their relative rarity, John Kantakouzenos approvingly referred to their efficiency in siege battles, while a new military office was also created, the stratopedarches ton tzangratoron.

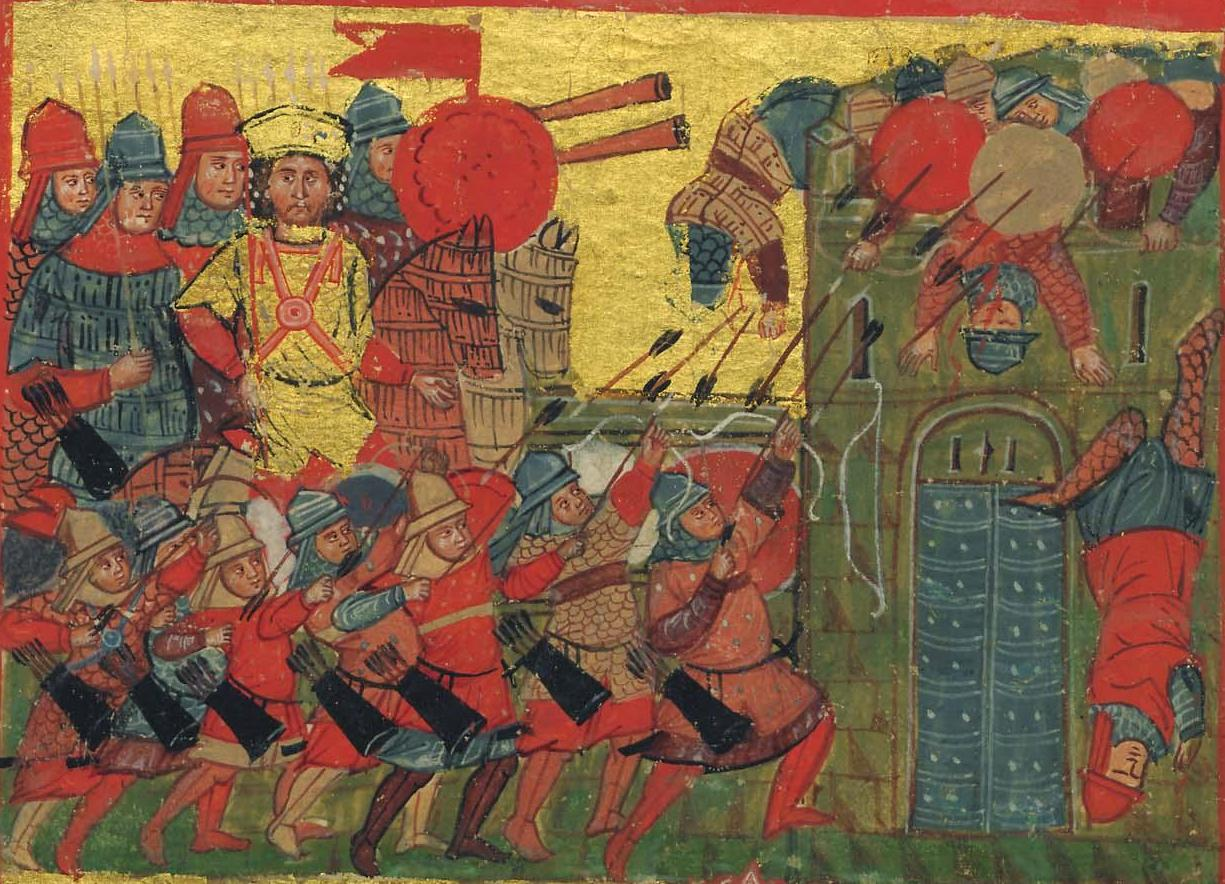
The Trebizond Alexander Romance depicting archers and cataphracts (mid-14th century)

Gunpowder weapons were spreading in the Balkans from the second half of the 14th century and were well established by the 15th, but the Byzantines failed to adopt them on a larger scale because of the lack of money. While the sources are limited and the terminology is often unclear, the only gunners fighting for Byzantium seem to have been Genoese mercenaries. Gunpowder artillery in the form of primitive bombards is attested for the sieges of Constantinople in 1422 and 1453. Indeed, the city had an own arsenal of bombards, although its walls proved incapable of sustaining their recoil, especially that of the largest ones. Additionally, their effectiveness was limited by a lack of understanding of their proper deployment as well as a shortage of gunpowder and ammunition. As there is no evidence that the Byzantines ever manufactured cannons themselves it seems most likely that they were imported from Italy.

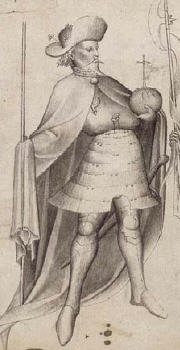
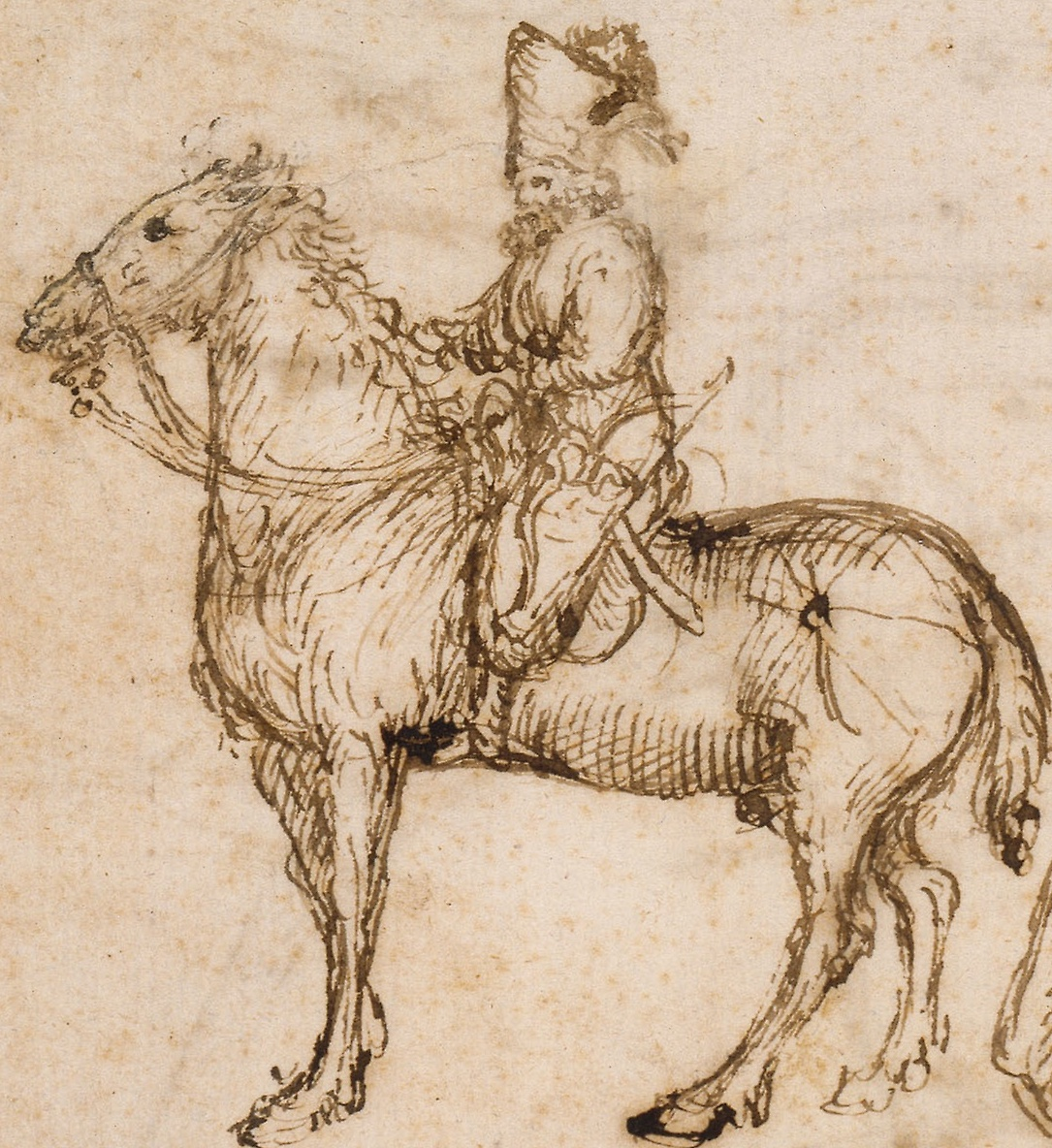
Left: Anonymous drawing of John VIII during his visit in Buda in 1424, depicting him wearing western plate armour Right: Sketch of John VIII from 1438, showing him in Turkish attire and with bow and sabre

=== Fortifications and siege warfare ===
Byzantine military strategy relied heavily on fortifying towns and cities. Walls consisted of stonework with layers of thick bricks in between, perhaps allowing for absorption of an attack. Later, as artillery became increasingly more effective, sloped walls came into play. The walls would be augmented by towers, evenly spaced out and running the length of the walls. The walled towers were designed to cover the entire town.

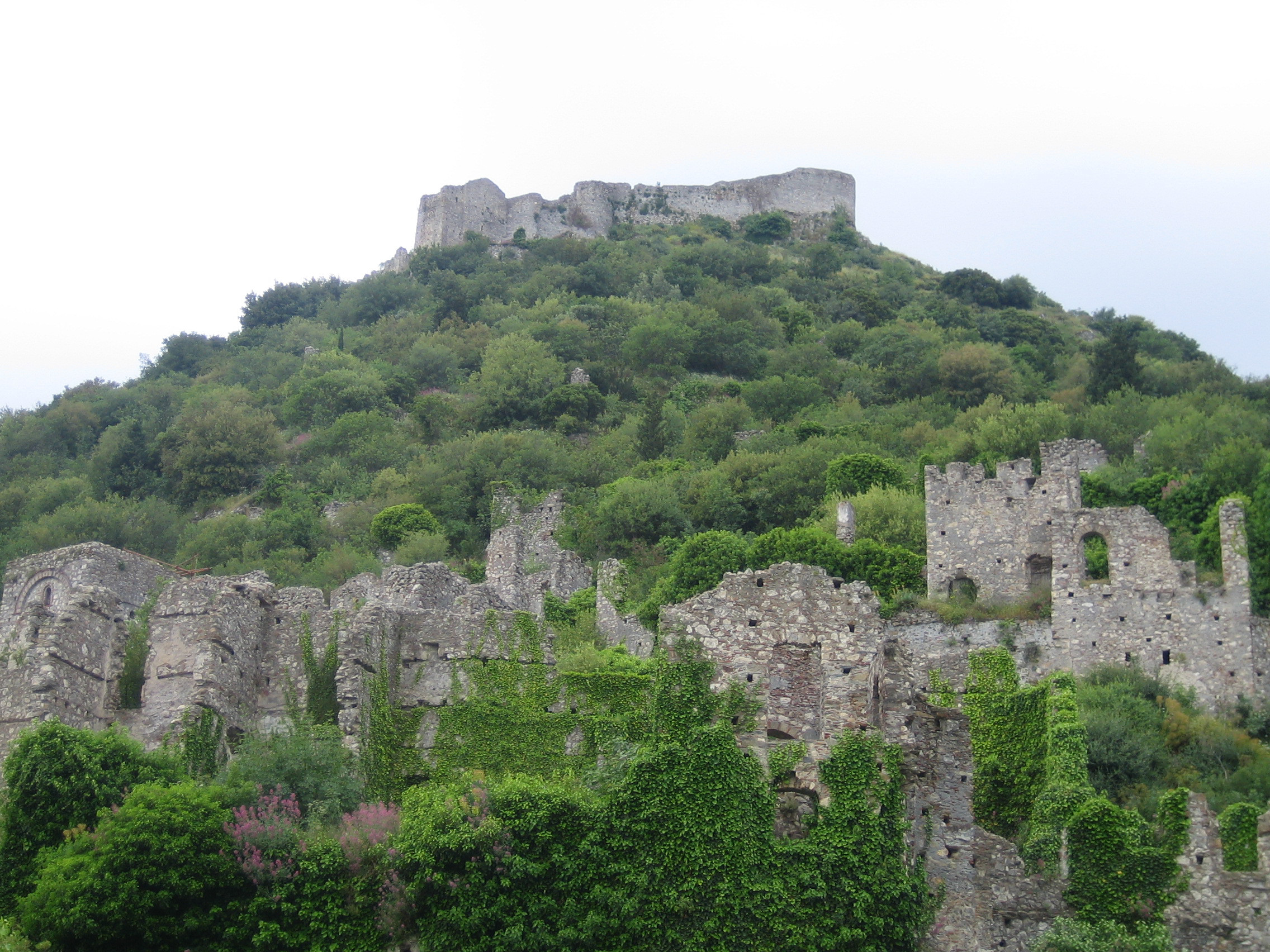
Ruined fortifications of Mystras, Laconia

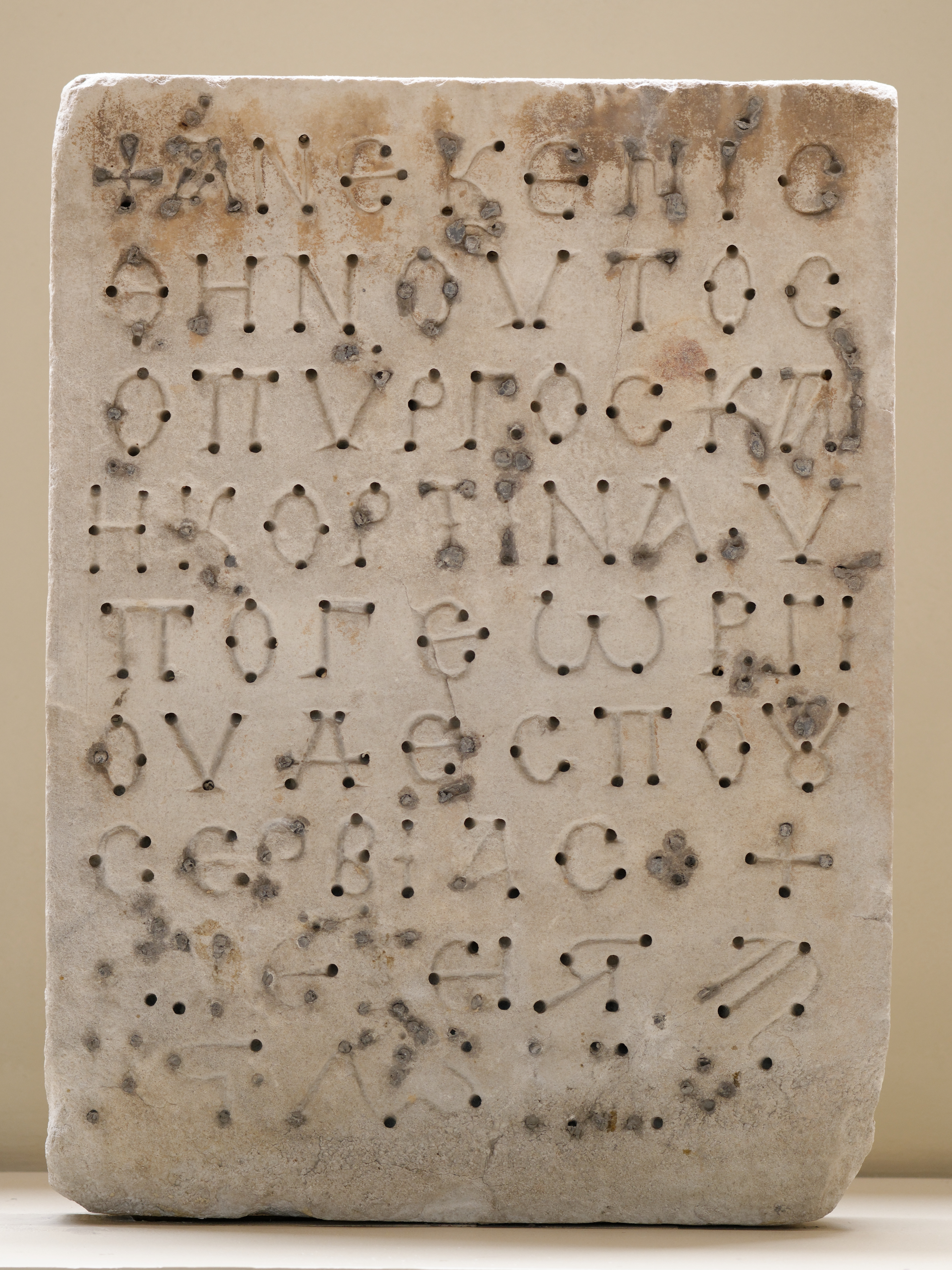
Inscription commemorating the repair of Constantinople's sea walls in 1448

Supplying towns and forts became Byzantium's worst problem and, though the Turks initially lacked the expertise to take walled towns, they could not be defeated on land nor their blockade broken. Cities such as Nicaea and Nicomedia fell after a few years or more. Even so, this was a longer period of time than the Crusaders in the Levant were able to hold out where impressive forts such as Krak des Chevaliers surrendered relatively quickly. Worse still were the Crusader forts in the Aegean, which often surrendered to the Byzantines and the Turks without a fight.

The Byzantine army regained an increasingly offensive role against the crusaders in the mid to late 13th century but many fortifications regained by the Byzantines fell out of use; a lack of manpower and multiple pressing fronts relegated these castles to abandonment. Some of the castles captured in Greece were used to control the local hostile Greek, Albanian, Vlach or other tribal peoples that opposed Frankish rule and since the Byzantines were both Greek and Orthodox, the threat that the Crusaders had to contend with existed on a lesser scale for the Byzantines, giving them another reason not to repair them. Constantinople's fortifications remained formidable, but repairing them proved impossible after 1370 due to the destructive nature of an ongoing civil war. By the time the Byzantines emerged from it, they were forced to acknowledge the suzerainty of the Ottoman Sultan, who threatened military action if any repairs were made to the millennium-old Walls of Constantinople. Heavily outnumbered, the walls of the capital provided the defenders in 1453 with 6 weeks of defense.

== Navy ==
The Byzantine navy had once been the most powerful navy in the Eastern Mediterranean up to and including the era of the Komnenian period. However, the neglect under the Angeloi seriously reduced Byzantium's capabilities at sea. Michael VIII reversed the situation and began increasing the size of the navy to about 80 ships. Michael's efforts bore little fruit, however, as is testified by the fact that 32 Venetian ships defeated a Byzantine-Genoan fleet of 48 ships. Worse still was that Michael VIII became increasingly reliant upon the Genoans for naval support, having hired 50–60 galleys in 1261. The Navy collapsed into worse shape still when Andronicus II, as part of his demilitarization of the Empire, disbanded the navy. The consequences did not simply mean an end to a Byzantine naval defense; it also meant an increased reliance on the unreliable Genoans and Venetians (who would consistently burn each other's property in the capital, thereby damaging the city) and left thousands of skilled sailors up for grabs by the Turks, who hired them to build their own fleets. By 1291, Andronicus II had hired 50–60 ships from the Republic of Genoa. Later in 1320, he realized the necessity of a navy and planned on resurrecting the fleet by constructing 20 galleys, but this attempt failed.

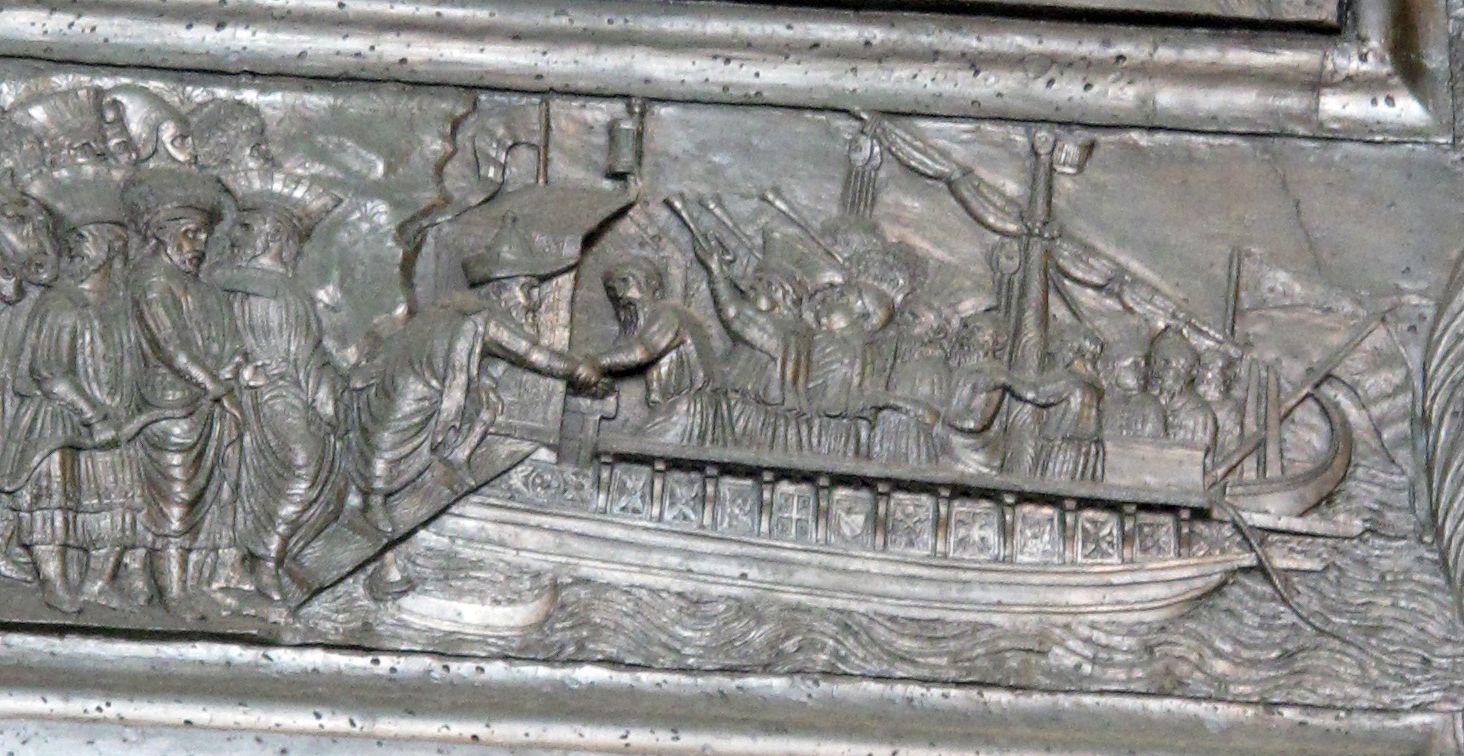
John VIII boarding his galley. Bronze door by Filarete in the St. Peter's Basilica, about 1448

The destruction of the fleet by Andronicus II was somewhat remedied by Andronicus III, his grandson, who revived the fleet and by 1332 had a navy of 10 ships. In 1329, the island of Chios was taken by the Byzantines after the Islanders rebelled against the Genoans. Still, the navy remained but one of many in the Aegean, which was also patrolled by Venetians, Crusaders, Turks and the Genoans, who evened the loss of Chios against the Greeks with the capture of Lesbos. From the death of Andronicus III the Empire's civil wars gave the Venetians and Genoans plenty of naval warfare to dominate whilst the lack of a central government and resources worsened the navy further. In 1453, the Empire's fleet consisted of 10 ships. At the conclusive siege of Constantinople, the navy numbered a mere 26 ships, 16 of which were foreign plus another three that arrived from Rome.

== Timeline ==
- 1259 – A Byzantine army of about 6,000 men participates in the Battle of Pelagonia where the empire scored a victory over the Franks.
- 1261 – Alexios Strategopoulos led a force of 800 men that succeeded in recapturing Constantinople without a siege.
- 1263 – An army of 15,000 men was sent to conquer the Principality of Achaea, but it was defeated near Andravida. Afterwards, 6,000 mounted troops were left to police the Peloponnese.
- 1250 – 1280 Michael Palaeologus campaigns against the Latins, Serbians and Bulgarians, conquering Macedonia, northern Greece, and Bulgarian lands in Thrace.
- 1279 – Ivan Asen III was accompanied by a Byzantine army of 10,000 men to claim the Bulgarian throne. He succeeded in capturing Tirnovo and overthrowing Ivailo.
- 1293–1295 – Alexios Philanthropenos drives back the Turks of Menteshe
- 1298–1300 – John Tarchaneiotes reforms the pronoia of the Thracesian Theme and strengthens the army against the Turks. His reforms are abandoned after his departure.
- 1302 – Andronicus II sent an army of 2,000 men to drive the Turks from Bithynia, but is defeated at the Battle of Bapheus, while another expedition to the south under Michael IX disintegrates.
- 1303 – In response to numerous Turkish raids, the Catalan Company of 6,500 men sell their services to the Byzantine Emperor.
- 1310 – 1340 Despite the assistance of the Golden Horde, Ilkhanate and Aydın, the last Byzantine towns in Asia are lost.
- 1321–1328 – Civil war between Andronicus II and his grandson Andronicus III, leads to the deposition of the former.
- 1329 – Andronicus III and John VI led an army of 4,000 men against the Ottoman Turks, but were defeated at the Battle of Pelekanon.
- 1330–1340 – Andronicus III conquers Epirus, the last of Byzantium's significant conquests.
- 1332 – The emperor launched a campaign against the Bulgarians with an army of 3,000 men, but was forced to withdraw when the tsar retaliated with 10,000 men (8,000 Bulgarians and 2,000 Tatars).
- 1334 – Significant fortresses in northern Macedonia fall to the Serbs under the renegade Syrgiannes Palaiologos
- 1341–1347 – Civil war between John VI Cantacuzenus and the regency for John V Palaeologus. Macedonia and Albania are lost to Stefan Dushan.
- 1354 – Galipolli is occupied by the Ottomans after an earthquake.
- 1354 – 1390 The Byzantine Empire loses all of Thrace to the advance of the Ottoman troops.
- 1394-1402 – Constantinople withstood siege by Bayezid I.
- 1411 – Constantinople withstood assault launched by Musa Çelebi
- 1422 – The Walls of Constantinople hold out against a full-scale Ottoman siege.
- 1430 – Thessalonica is sacked by the Ottomans, despite Venetian command of the city.
- c. 1450 – Constantine XI defeated the Crusaders in the Morea, temporarily expanding Byzantine rule there. The Ottomans in reply launch their own offensive, nullifying the gains.
- 1453 – Constantine XI, last Basileus and commander of the Byzantine Empire, defending Constantinople with 7,000 men, is slain in battle.

== See also ==
- Byzantine-Ottoman Wars
- Byzantium under the Palaiologoi

== Sources ==
- Bartusis, Mark C. (1997). The Late Byzantine Army: Arms and Society 1204–1453. Philadelphia, Pennsylvania: University of Pennsylvania Press. ISBN 0-8122-1620-2.
- Kanellopoulos, Nikolaos S.; Lekea, Ioanna K. (2014). "Prelude to Kephissos (1311): An Analysis of the Battle of Apros (1305)". Journal of Medieval Military History. XII. Woodbridge: The Boydell Press: 119–137. ISBN 978-1-84383-936-1. ISSN 1477-545X.
