= Koza Han =

Caravanserai in Bursa, Turkey

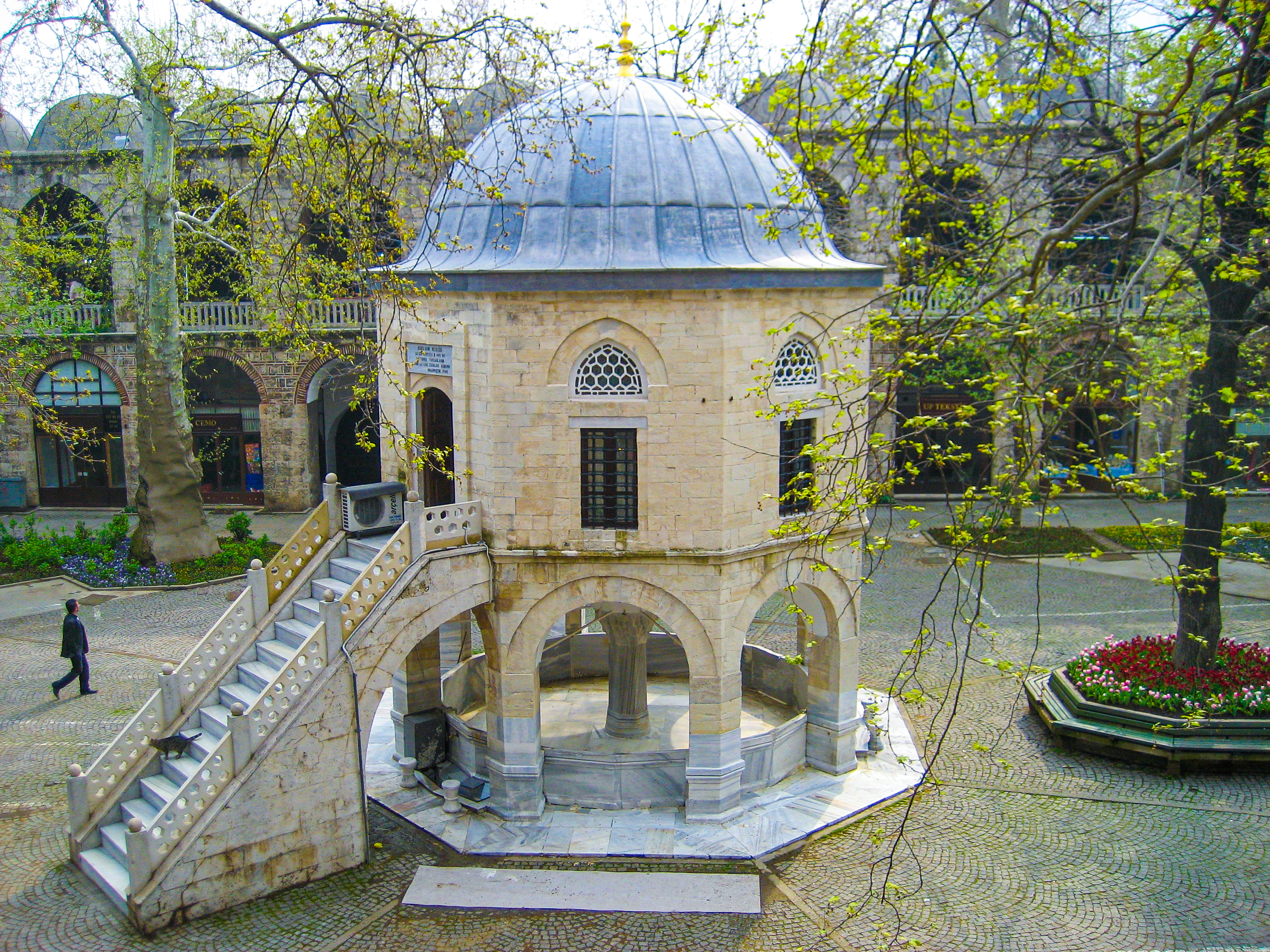
- The courtyard of the han, with the mescit (small mosque) at its center

General information
- Type: Caravanserai
- Architectural style: Ottoman
- Location: Bursa, Turkey
- Coordinates: 40°11′3.6″N 29°03′48.7″E
- Construction started: 1490
- Completed: 1491

Technical details
- Material: stone, brick
- Floor count: 2
- Location within Turkey

UNESCO World Heritage Site
- Part of: Bursa and Cumalıkızık: the Birth of the Ottoman Empire
- Criteria: Cultural: (i), (ii), (iv), (vi)
- Reference: 1452-001
- Inscription: 2014 (38th Session)

The Koza Han (Turkish: Koza Hanı, lit. 'inn of the silk cocoon') is a historic caravanserai (han) in Bursa, Turkey. It is located in the heart of the city's historic market district.

== History ==
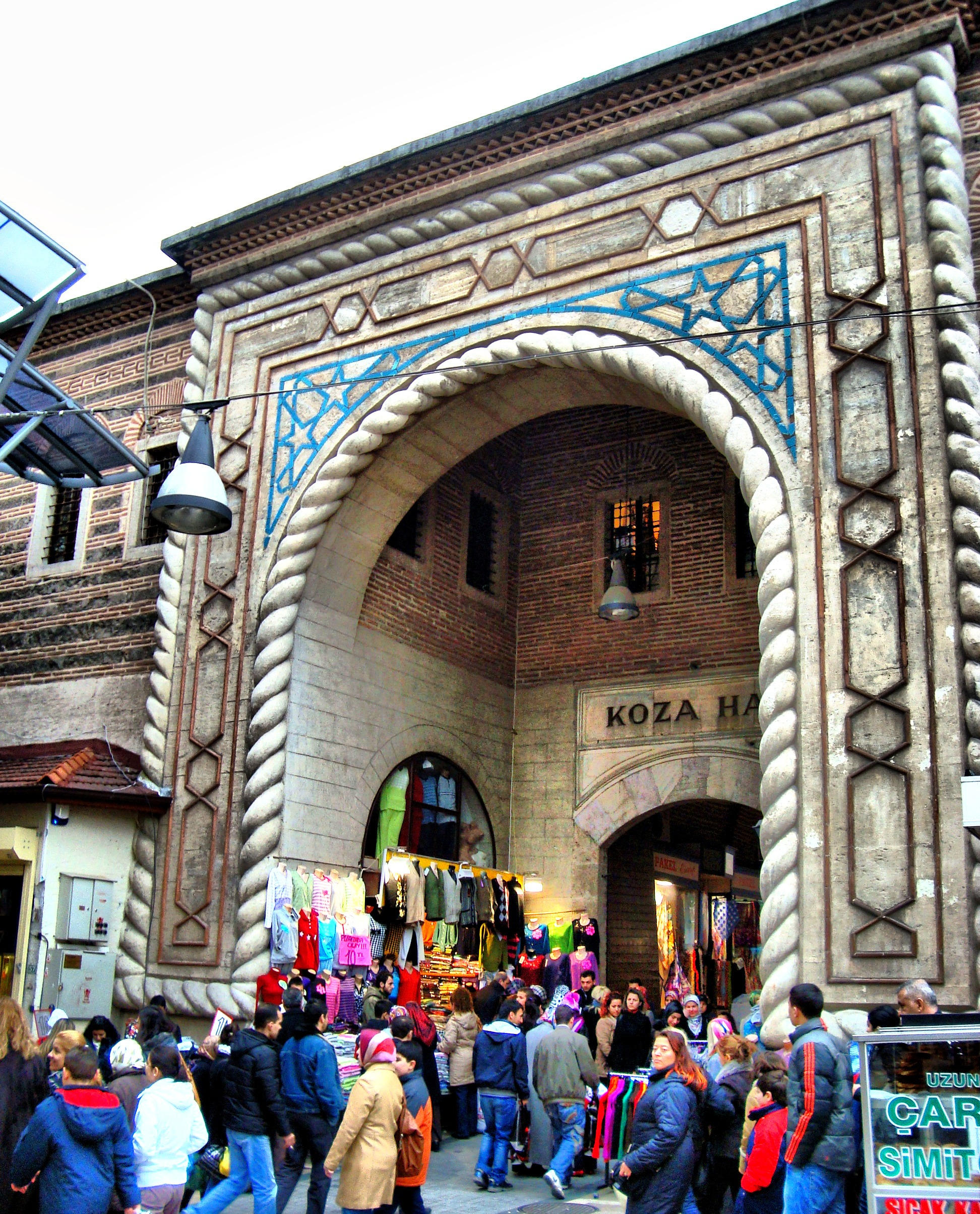
The entrance portal

Bursa, the first capital of the Ottoman Empire, was also its center of silk production and trade. Particularly in the 14th to 16th centuries, a large number of commercial structures such as hans (caravanserais), bazaars (covered markets), and a bedesten were built in the city center, forming a major zone of economic activity. (At least 13 of these structures have survived today despite numerous earthquakes.) It is here, next to the old Orhan Gazi Mosque, that Sultan Bayezid II ordered the construction of the Koza Han in February or March of 1490. The architect was a man named Abdul Ula Bin Pulad Shah, and the building opened in September 1491. Through the waqf system, the revenues of the han were earmarked to finance the upkeep of Bayezid's mosque complex in Istanbul.

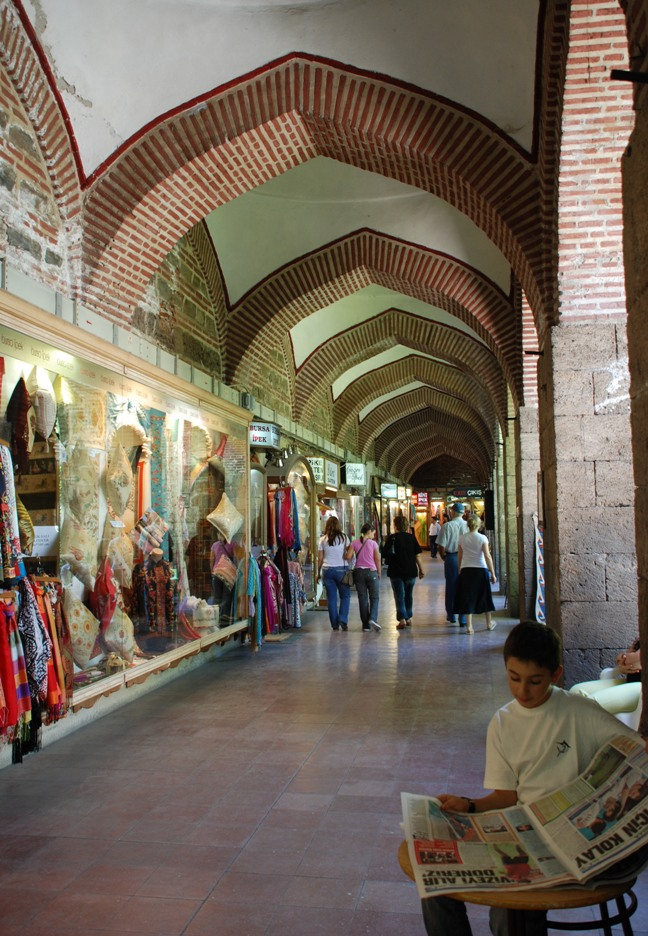
The vaulted corridor around the courtyard

As a caravanserai, the han provided lodging for foreign merchants, storage for their animals and goods, housing for the workshops of craftsmen, and/or offices for conducting business. The Koza Han was one of the largest and most important examples in Bursa. In the early 16th century the commercial agent of the Medicis of Florence had his office in this building. It continued to be a center of silk trade throughout its history, with expensive silk shops still present in the building today, although the industry is no longer as prominent as it once was. In addition to silk textiles, its trade also included the production and sale of silk cocoons themselves (hence its name). The han has also undergone numerous restorations and repairs, including in 1630, 1671 and 1784. The small mosque at its center was most recently restored in 1946 and in 2007. Queen Elizabeth II visited the han in the company of Turkish President Abdullah Gül in 2008. Today the han also contains cafés and tea gardens.

== Architecture ==
The han is built in alternating layers of brick and stone, which forms part of the decorative visual effect of its exterior. Like most typical caravanserais, it has a rectangular floor plan with a large central courtyard measuring 45.9 by 37.5 metres. Around the courtyard runs a two-story gallery that gives access to small vaulted rooms that ring the complex. The ground floor contains 50 rooms and the upper floor has 54 rooms. At the center of the courtyard is a small octagonal stone mosque or prayer room (mescit) which is raised above the ground on 8 pillars and reached by a marble staircase. The reason for this elevation was to make sure the mosque was not soiled by pack animals which were kept by merchants on the ground floor. Under the mosque, at ground level, is a fountain and washing area for ritual ablutions. The han is entered via a monumental stone and brick portal that projects from the rest of the building's façade. The portal is decorated with a spiral moulding along its edges, as well as with geometric patterns made of inset coloured tile on the spandrels above the archway.
