= Siege of Nicaea (1328–1331) =

1328–1331 capture of the Eastern Roman city of Nicaea by the Ottoman Empire

Coordinates: 40.5833°N 30.1333°E

- Part of the Byzantine–Ottoman wars
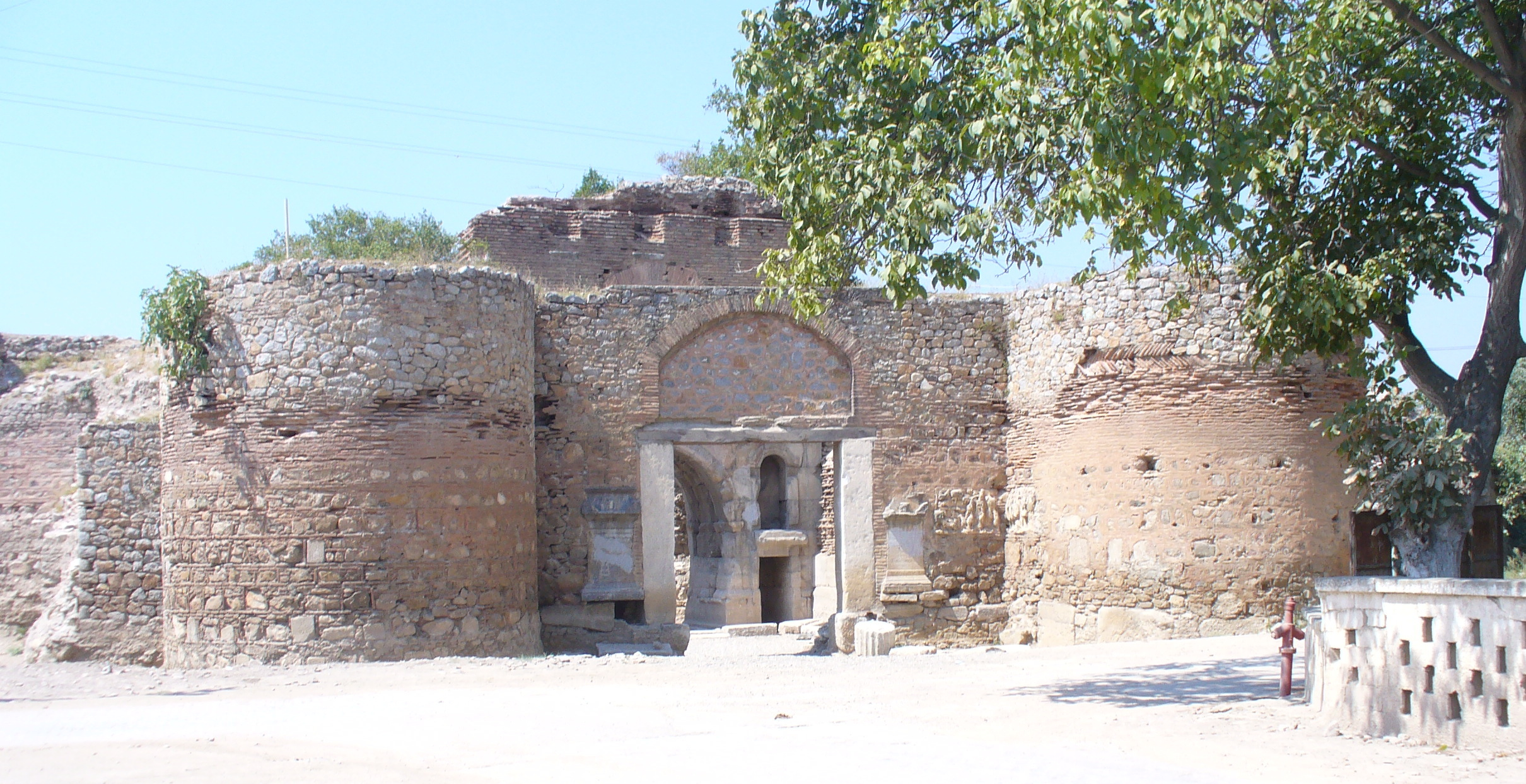
- The Lefke Gate in Iznik, along the western ramparts of the city
Date	1328 to 1331
Location	Nicaea (modern-day İznik, Bursa, Turkey)
Result	Ottoman victory

Belligerents
Byzantine Empire	(Ottoman Empire) Ottoman Beylik

Commanders and leaders
Unknown	(Ottoman Empire) Orhan Ghazi

Strength
Unknown	Unknown

Casualties and losses
Unknown	Unknown

The Siege of Nicaea, or Siege of Iznik (Ottoman Turkish: فتحِ ازنيق, romanized: Feth-i İznik), by the forces of Orhan I from 1328 to 1331, resulted in the conquest of the key Byzantine city of Nicaea (nowadays İznik) by the Ottomans. It played an important role in the expansion of the Ottoman Empire.

== Background ==
Following the reconquest of Constantinople from the Latins, the Byzantines concentrated their efforts on restoring their hold on Greece. Troops had to be taken from the eastern front in Anatolia and into the Peloponnese, with the disastrous consequence that what land the Nicaean Empire held in Anatolia was now open to Ottoman raids. With the increasing frequency and ferocity of raids, Byzantine imperial authorities pulled back from Anatolia.

== Siege ==
By 1326, lands around Nicaea had fallen into the hands of Osman I. He had also captured the city of Bursa, establishing a capital dangerously close to the Byzantine capital of Constantinople. In 1328, Orhan, Osman's son, began the siege of Nicaea, which had been in a state of intermittent blockade since 1301. The Ottomans lacked the ability to control access to the town through the lakeside harbour. As a result, the siege dragged on for several years without conclusion.

In 1329, Emperor Andronicus III attempted to break the siege. He led a relief force to drive the Ottomans away from both Nicomedia and Nicaea. After some minor successes, however, the force suffered a reverse at Pelekanon and withdrew. When it was clear that no effective Imperial force would be able to restore the frontier and drive off the Ottomans, the city proper fell on 2 March 1331. Those inhabitants who wished to leave were permitted to do so, though few did.

== Aftermath ==
For a short period, the town became the capital of the expanding Ottoman Emirate, The large church of Hagia Sophia in the center of the town was converted into the Orhan Mosque, and a medrese (theological school) and hamam (bathhouse) were built nearby. The inhabitants of Nicaea were quickly and willingly incorporated into the growing Ottoman Empire, and many of them had already embraced Islam by 1340.

Patriarch John XIV of Constantinople wrote a message to the people of Nicea shortly after the city was seized. His letter says that "The invaders endeavored to impose their impure religion on the populace, at all costs, intending to make the inhabitants followers of Muhammad". The Patriarch advised the Christians to "be steadfast in your religion" and not to forget that the "Hagarenes [Turks] are masters of your bodies only, but not of your souls".After the fall of Nicaea, the scholar Nikephoros Gregoras also remarked that:

The barbarians settled on the shores of Bithynia without fear and imposed the heaviest taxes on the remaining small towns. They did not, for a short time, drive the people and towns to complete destruction, for they were able to pay them easily and quickly. However, they [Turks] did not cease to make frequent attacks and to enslave the majority of the poor ones both on sea and land.

The Moroccan traveler Ibn Battuta stayed in Nicaea at the end of 1331, According to Ibn Battuta, the town was in ruins and only inhabited by a small number of people in the service of the sultan. Within the city walls were gardens and cultivated plots with each house surrounded by an orchard. The town produced fruit, walnuts, chestnuts, and large sweet grapes.

Nicaea had been in Turkish hands before. It was reconquered by the First Crusade through Byzantine diplomacy in 1097. It had served as the capital of the Byzantine emperors during the period of the Latin Empire from 1204 to 1261. It was the most important Asian city in the empire at the time of its fall to Osman. The Ottoman conquests continued apace and Nicomedia fell in 1337. Hence, this long-held history of Nicaea in the Greco-Roman hands irreversibly ended. It had been under Greco-Roman control since the conquest of Alexander the Great, and it was the seat of several milestone Christian councils.
