= Battle of Pelekanon =

1329 battle of the Byzantine-Ottoman Wars

Coordinates: 41°00′36″N 29°09′01″E

- Part of the Byzantine–Ottoman wars
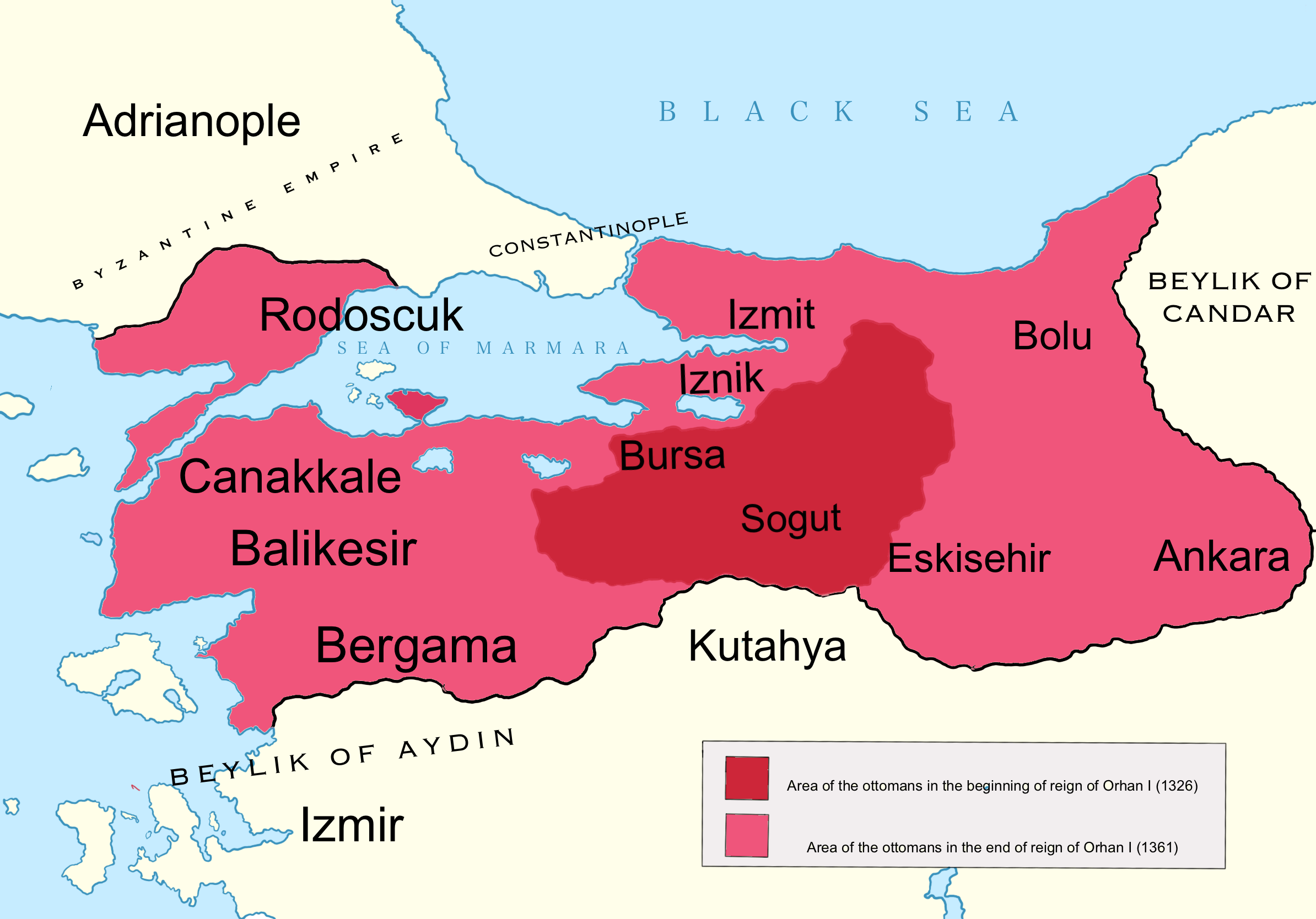
- Map of Ottoman expansion under Orhan
Date	June 10–11, 1329
Location	Near Nicomedia, Bithynia (present day: Maltepe, Turkey)
Result	Ottoman victory

Belligerents
Byzantine Empire	(Ottoman Empire) Ottoman Beylik

Commanders and leaders
(Byzantine Empire) Andronikos III Palaiologos (WIA) (Byzantine Empire) John Kantakouzenos (WIA)	(Ottoman Empire) Orhan Ghazi

Strength
~4,000	~8,000

Casualties and losses
Heavy	Unknown

The Battle of Pelekanon, also known by its Latinised form Battle of Pelecanum, occurred on June 10–11, 1329, between an expeditionary force by the Byzantines led by Andronikos IIl and an Ottoman army led by Orhan I. The Byzantine army was defeated, with no further attempt made at relieving the cities in Anatolia under Ottoman siege.

== Background ==
By the accession of Andronikos in 1328, the Imperial territories in Anatolia had dramatically shrunk from almost all of the west of modern Turkey forty years earlier to a few scattered outposts along the Aegean Sea and a small core province around Nicomedia within about 150 km of the capital city Constantinople. Recently the Turks, under their energetic leader Osman I, had captured the important city of Prusa (Bursa) in Bithynia. Andronikos decided to relieve the important besieged cities of Nicomedia and Nicaea, and hoped to restore the frontier to a stable position.

== Battle ==
Together with the Grand Domestic John Kantakouzenos, Andronikos led an army of about 4,000 men, which was the greatest he could muster. They marched along the Sea of Marmara towards Nicomedia. At Pelekanon, a Turkish army led by Orhan I had encamped on the hills to gain a strategic advantage and blocked the road to Nicomedia. On 10 June, Orhan sent 300 cavalry archers downhill to lure the Byzantines unto the hills, but these were driven off by the Byzantines, who were unwilling to advance further. The belligerent armies engaged in indecisive clashes until nightfall. The Byzantine army prepared to retreat, but the Turks gave them no chance to retreat. Both Andronikos and Kantakouzenos were lightly wounded, but rumors had spread among the troops that the Emperor had either been killed or mortally wounded, resulting in mass panic among the Byzantine army. Eventually the retreat turned into a rout with heavy casualties on the Byzantine side. Kantakouzenos led the remaining Byzantine soldiers back to Constantinople by sea.

== Consequences ==
The Battle of Pelekanon was the first engagement in which a Byzantine emperor encountered an Ottoman Bey. The battle's effect on morale was more important than the battle itself as the heavily armed and disciplined Byzantines had fled before the lightly armed and irregular Turks. A campaign of restoration was aborted. Never again did a Byzantine army attempt to regain territory in Asia. The former imperial capitals of Nicomedia and Nicaea were not relieved and the maintenance of Imperial control across the Bosphorus was no longer tenable. The Ottomans conquered Nicaea in 1331 and İzmit in 1337, thus building up a strong base from which they eventually swept away the Byzantine Empire as a whole. The inhabitants of Nicaea and Nicomedia were quickly incorporated into the growing Ottoman nation while contemporary Byzantine ecclesiastical sources and pastoral letters from Patriarch John XIV reflect the Church's deep anxiety over the local population rapidly converting to Islam following the Ottoman takeover. With the capture of these cities and the annexation of the Beylik of Karasi in 1336, the Ottomans had completed their conquest of Bithynia and the north-western corner of Anatolia.
