= Siege of Nicomedia =

Fall of Byzantine Nicomedia to the Ottoman Empire

- Part of the Byzantine–Ottoman wars
Date	1337
Location	Nicomedia, Opsikion, Byzantine Empire (modern-day İzmit, Kocaeli, Turkey) 40°46′00″N 29°55′00″E
Result	Ottoman victory

Belligerents
Byzantine Empire	(Ottoman Empire) Ottoman Beylik

Commanders and leaders
Unknown	(Ottoman Empire) Orhan Ghazi

Strength
Unknown	Unknown

Casualties and losses
Unknown	Unknown

The Siege of Nicomedia, or Siege of Izmit (Ottoman Turkish: فتحِ ازمیت, romanized: Feth-i İzmit), took place from 1333 until 1337, when Orhan laid siege to the city of Nicomedia (now İzmit). The Byzantine garrison surrendered due to lack of food and resources. Orhan's victory sealed Ottoman control of Bithynia.

== Siege ==
Following the loss of Nicaea in 1331, Byzantine emperor Andronikos III Palaiologos proposed the payment of tribute to Orhan. Andronikos needed a free hand in the Balkans where Albania, Serbia and Bulgaria were in revolt against Byzantine rule. Orhan rejected his overtures and laid siege to Nicomedia (modern İzmit). In 1337, Andronikos effectively abandoned Nicomedia as he led his army to Albania. The besieged garrison was desperately short of food and supplies by then and so Nicomedia surrendered to Orhan. The inhabitants were allowed to leave the city for Constantinople.

== Aftermath ==
The fall of Nicomedia enabled Orhan to overrun Bithynia and extend Ottoman rule to the eastern shore of the Bosporus. Apart from the city of Philadelphia, which fell to the Ottomans in 1390, the fall of Nicomedia marked the end of Byzantine rule in Asia Minor.

== Additional source ==
- R.G. Grant, Battle: A Visual Journey Through 5,000 Years of Combat, Dorling Kindersley Publishers Ltd, 2005. ISBN 0-7566-1360-4
