= Orhan Gazi Mosque =

Historic mosque in Bursa, Turkey

- Orhan Gazi Camii
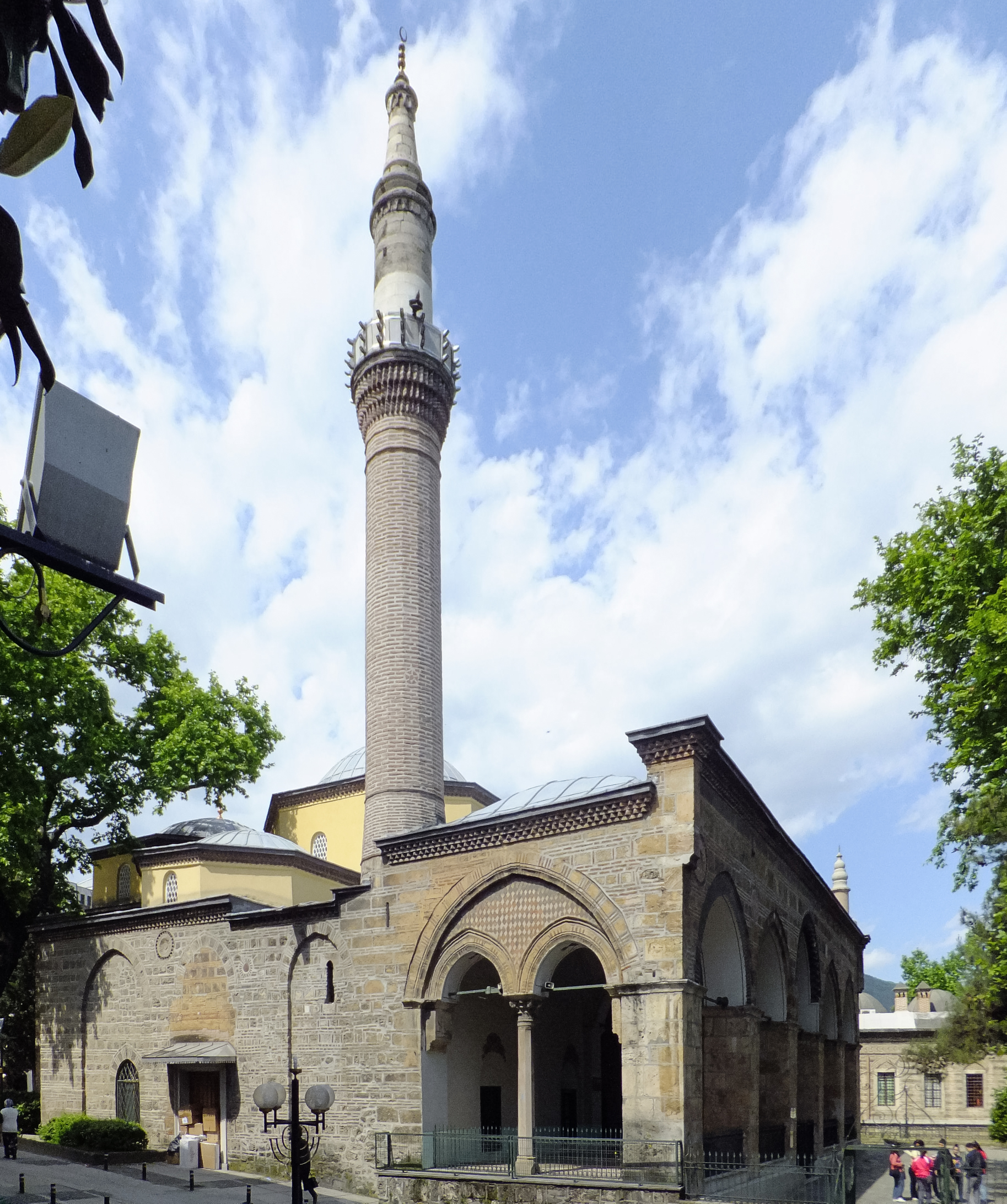

- Location of the mosque in Turkey.

Religion
- Affiliation: Islam

Location
- Location: Bursa, Turkey
- Interactive map of Orhan Gazi Mosque
- Coordinates: 40°11′2″N 29°03′51″E

Architecture
- Type: Mosque
- Style: Ottoman architecture
- Groundbreaking: 1339

Specifications
- Minaret: 1
- Materials: brick

The Orhan Gazi Mosque (Turkish: Orhan Gazi Camii) is a historic mosque in Bursa, Turkey. It is named after the Ottoman ruler Orhan, who founded the mosque in 1339–40 as part of a larger charitable complex. It is one of the oldest surviving monuments commissioned by the Ottoman dynasty.

== History ==
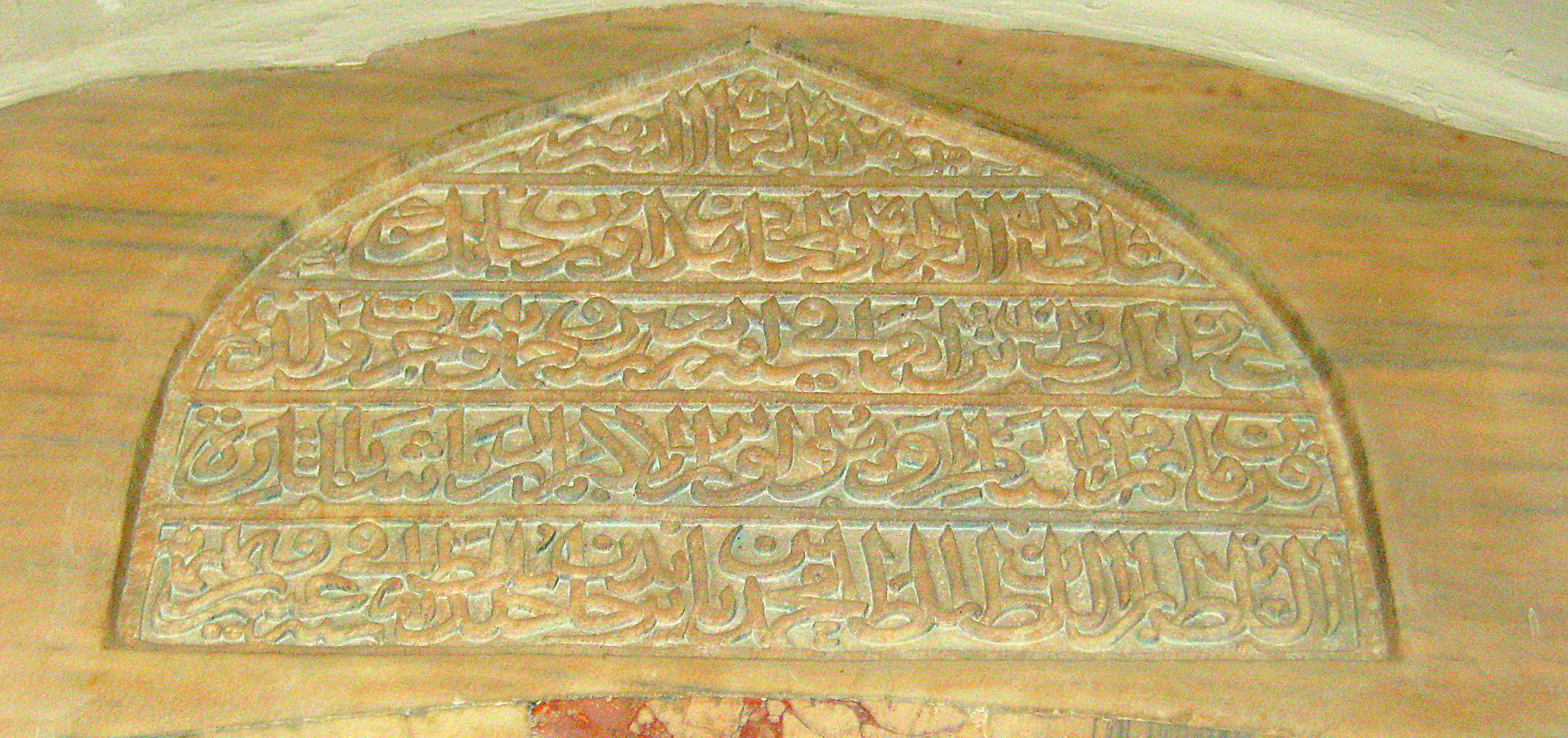
The Arabic foundation inscription over the mosque's entrance

The mosque was built by the Ottoman ruler Orhan (known as Orhan Gazi) and is dated to 1339–40 AD (740 AH), as attested by a surviving Arabic inscription over the gate. The mosque was damaged by fire during the siege of Bursa by the Karamanid ruler Mehmed II in 1413, with its front façade and portico being destroyed. The mosque was repaired in 1417 on the order of Sultan Mehmed I, who charged Bayezid Pasha, his grand vizier, with the task.

The oldest waqf document (vakıf in Turkish) concerning the mosque is dated to 1360. An addition to it around 1400 describes it as a zaviye (or zawiya). Like other buildings of this type erected in the early Ottoman period, the Orhan Mosque was originally designed to serve Sufi dervishes, providing them with lodging and a venue for their meetings and rituals.

The current minaret dates from the 17th century, built over the base of an older minaret. Like many other historic structures in the city, the mosque was damaged in the 1855 Bursa earthquake and it was restored by French architect Léon Parvillée in 1863–1864. The current painted decoration inside the mosque was created in 1864, according to an inscription over the mihrab. The conical lead cap of the minaret was redone in 1899. It was again restored in 1904.

== Architecture ==
The mosque has a "T-plan" layout typical of many early Ottoman religious complexes in Bursa and elsewhere. It has a square central court covered by a dome, surrounded by three iwans, one branching off every side except the north side where the building entrance is located. Each iwan is also covered by a dome. The iwan on the south side is aligned with the qibla (direction of prayer) and contains the mosque's mihrab, which is colorfully painted. The entrance to the mosque is fronted by a domed portico.

The lack of documentation from Parvillée's restoration makes it unclear how much of the current building is original. A study by Robert Ousterhout states that most of the walls are still original. Doğan Kuban believes that the dome in front of the mihrab, over the qibla iwan, may date from the early 15th-century restoration by Bayezid Pasha. The upper walls and much of the rest of the roof are likely reconstructions.

Robert Ousterhout compares the brick construction of the mosque and some of its related decorative details to Byzantine architecture, contrasting them with the stone-built architecture of the Anatolian Seljuk tradition. He suggests that the same groups of builders could have been building both Byzantine churches and Ottoman mosques in the region around during Orhan's time.

Elements of the mosque

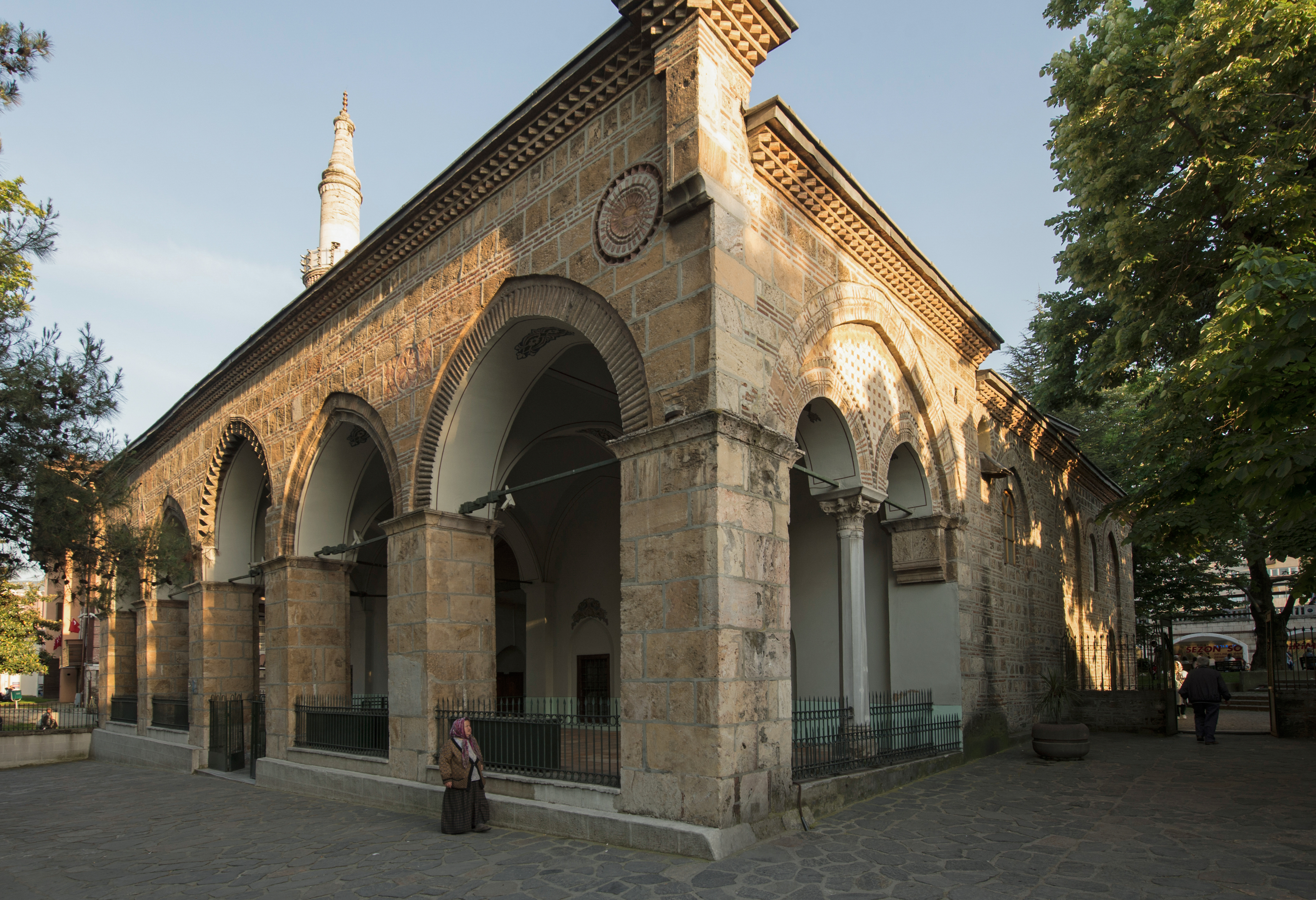
Front portico of the mosque, seen from the northwest

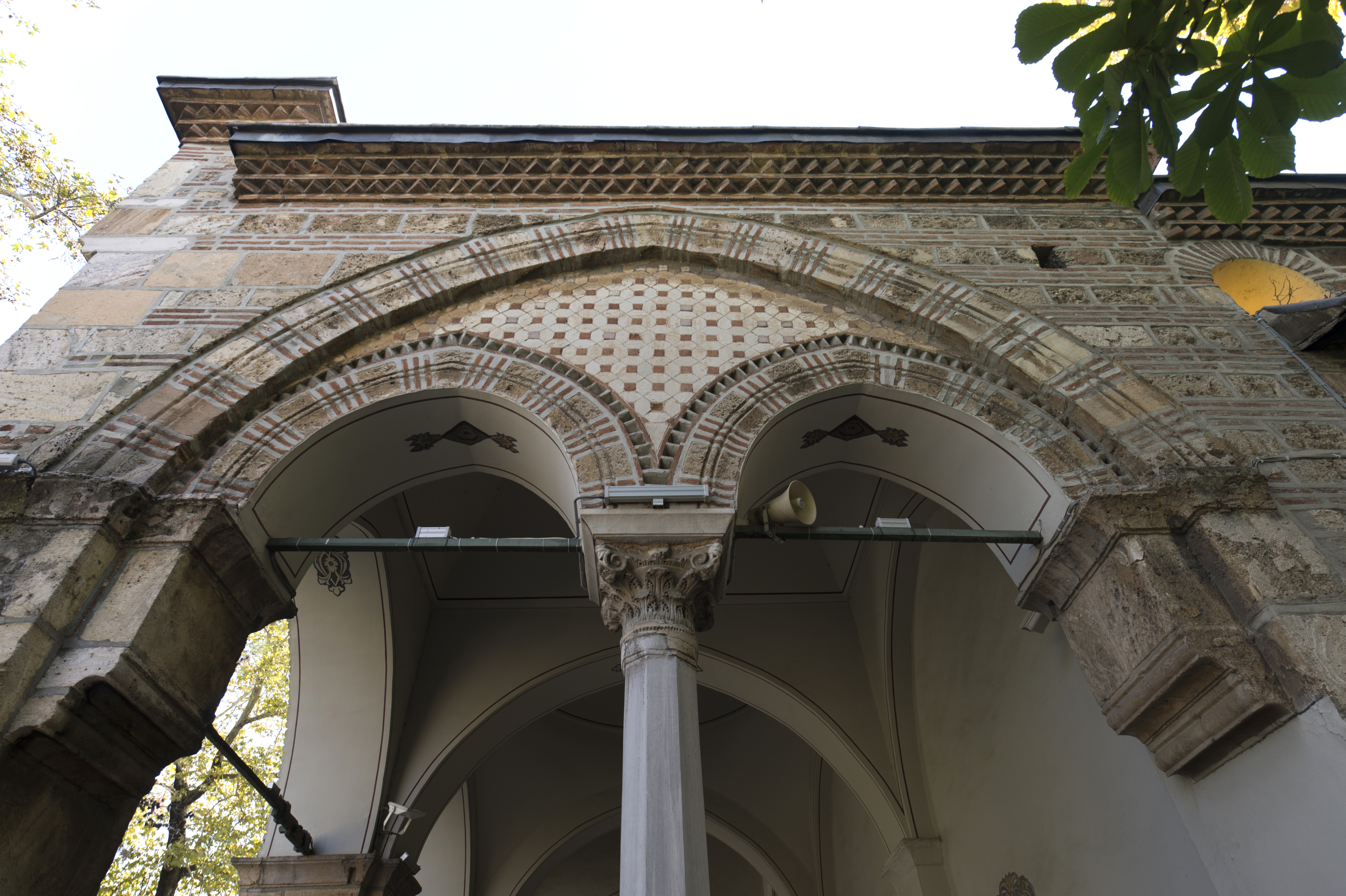
Bifora with Corinthian column and truncated reveals

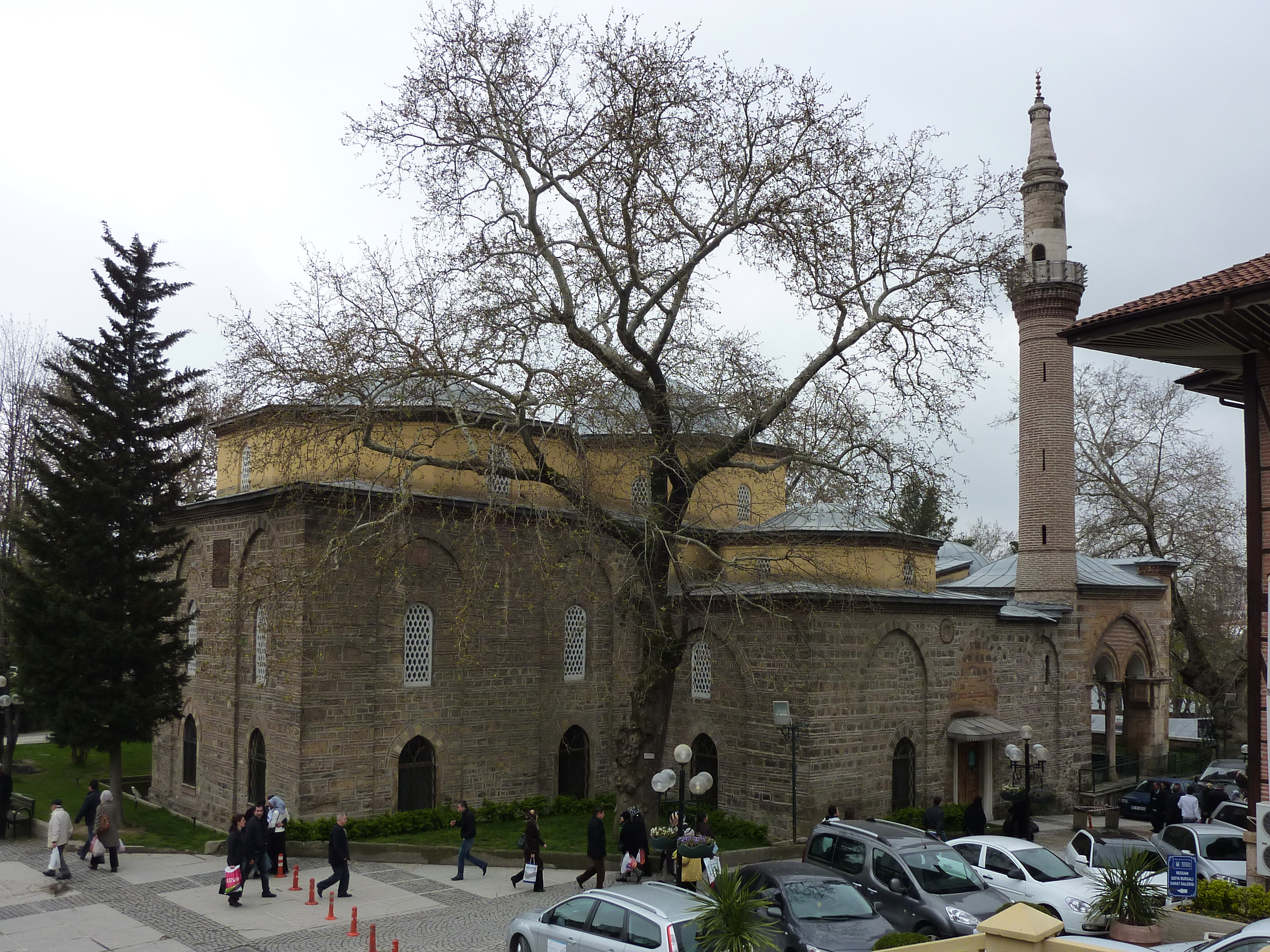
Exterior of the mosque, seen from the southeast (with the qibla section on the left)

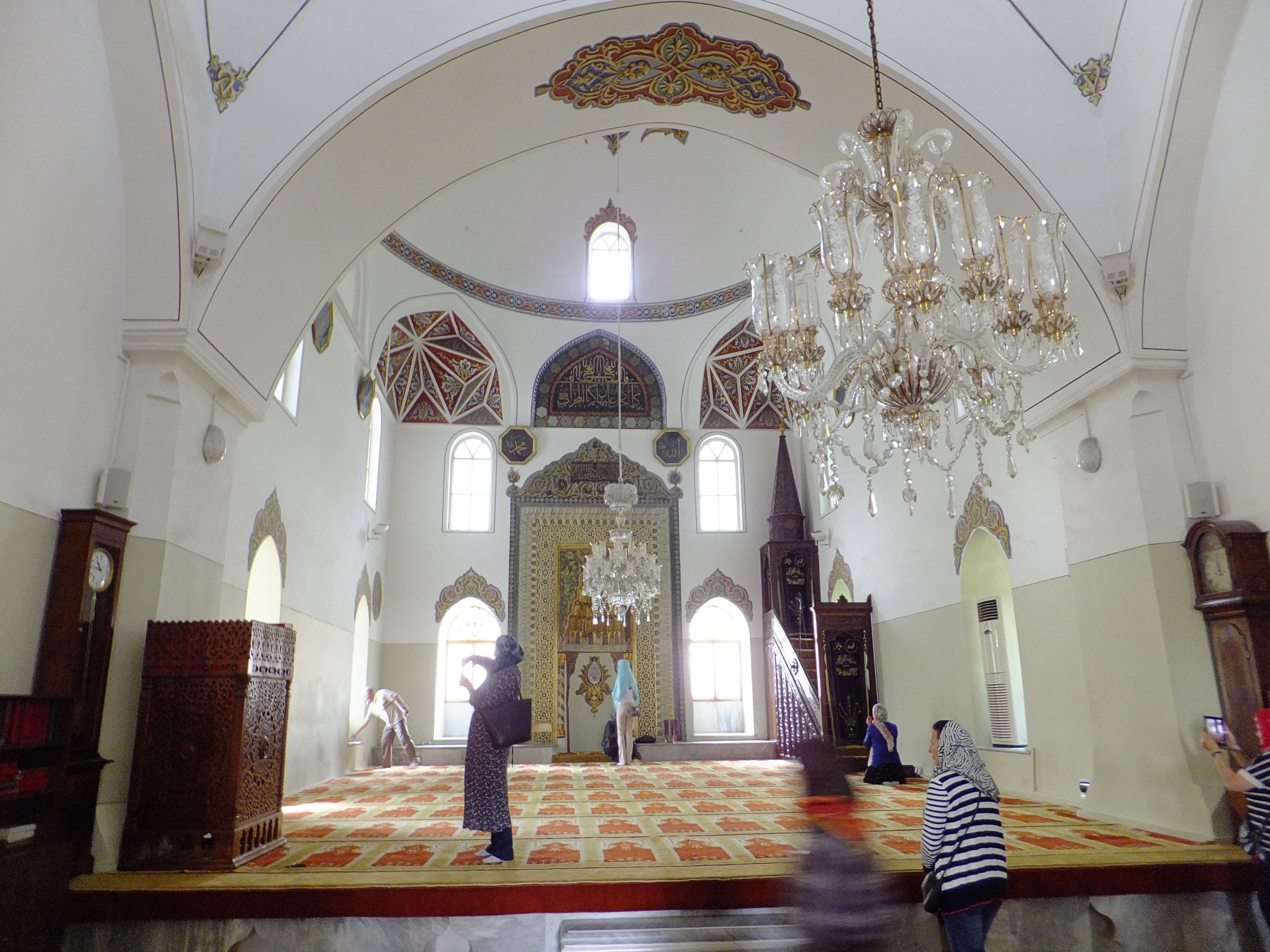
View of the interior, looking towards the qibla iwan and the mihrab

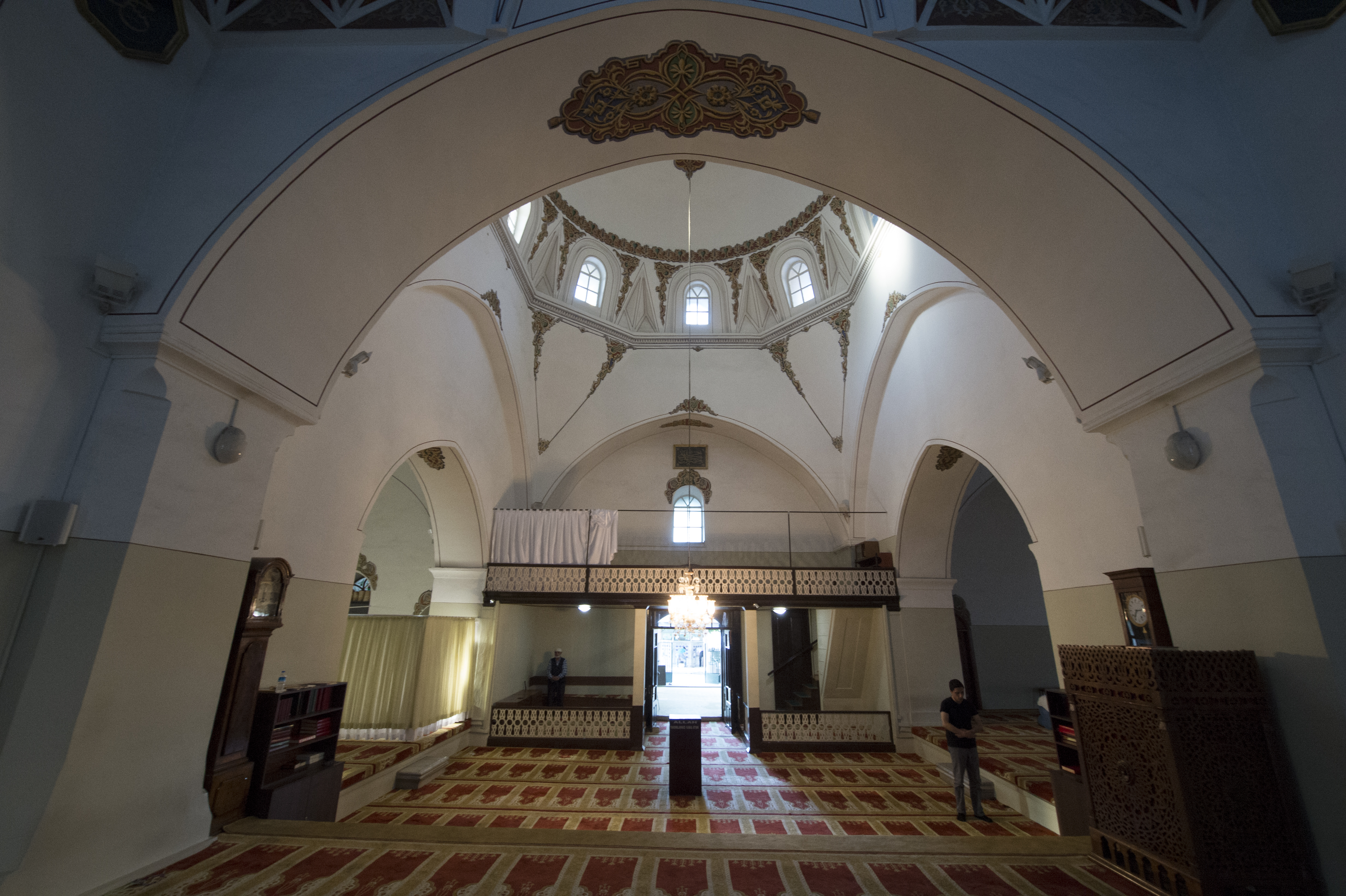
View of the interior, looking towards the entrance (with the two lateral iwans opening on the right and left)

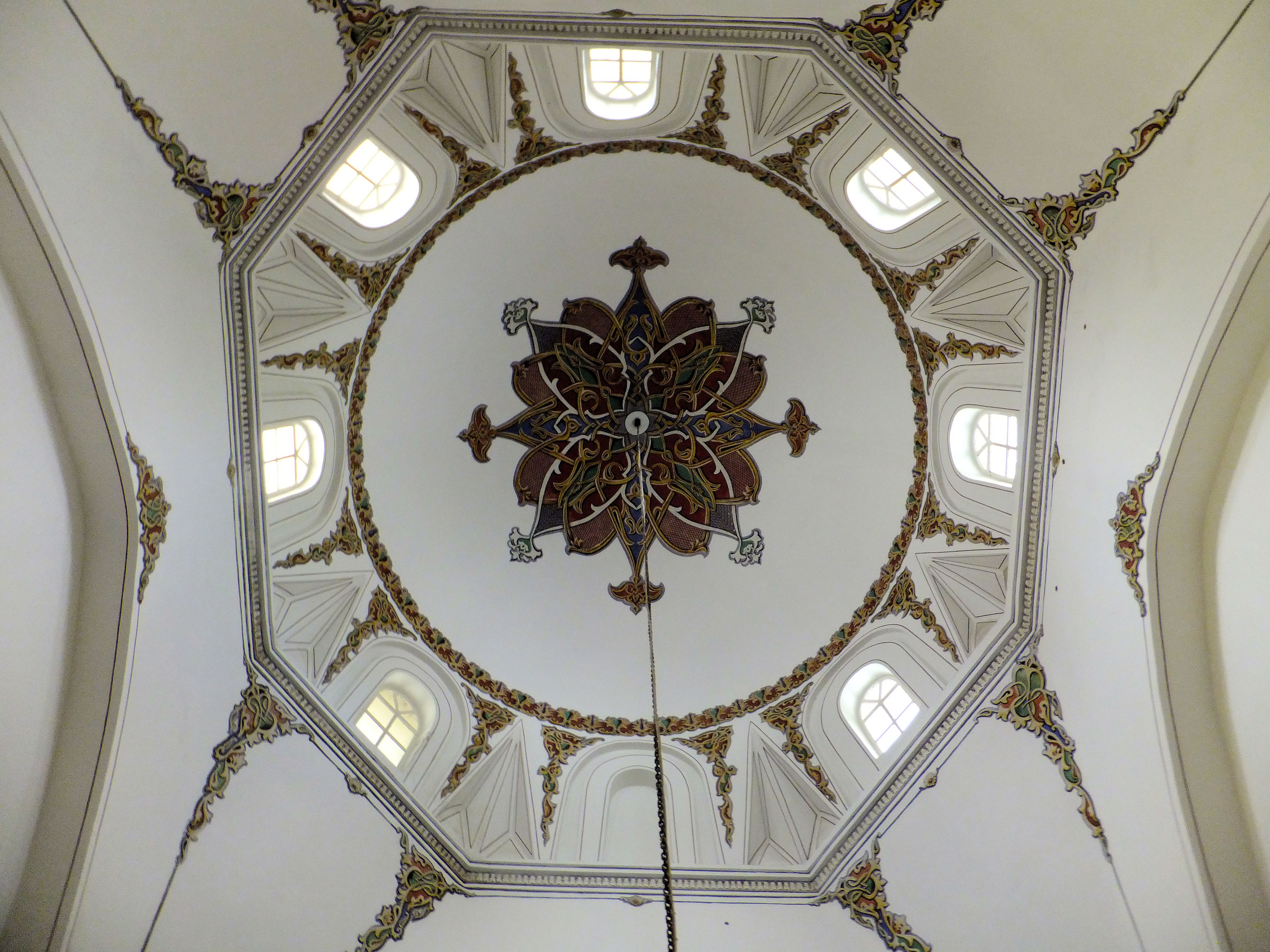
The dome over the central court

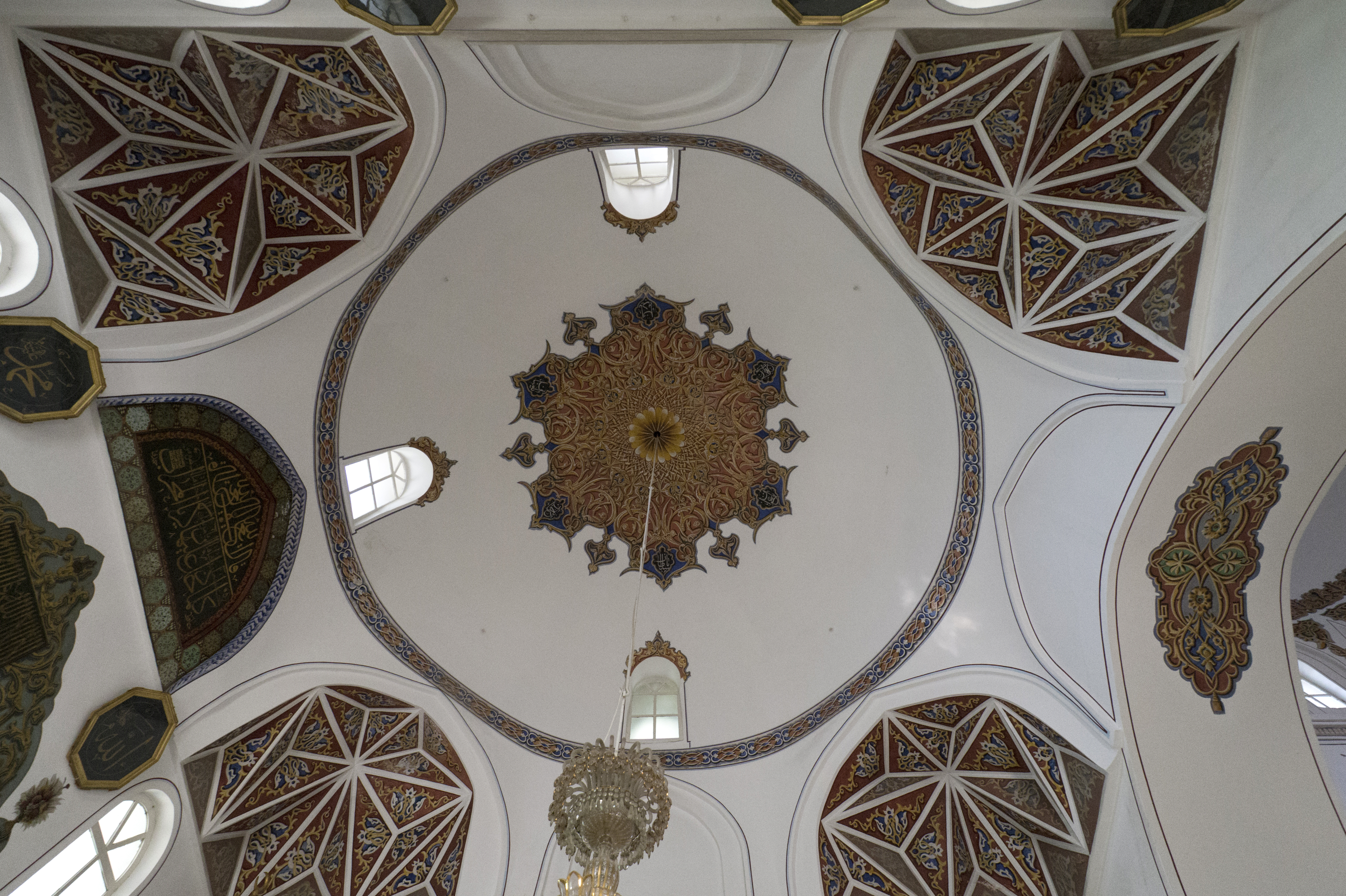
The dome over the qibla iwan

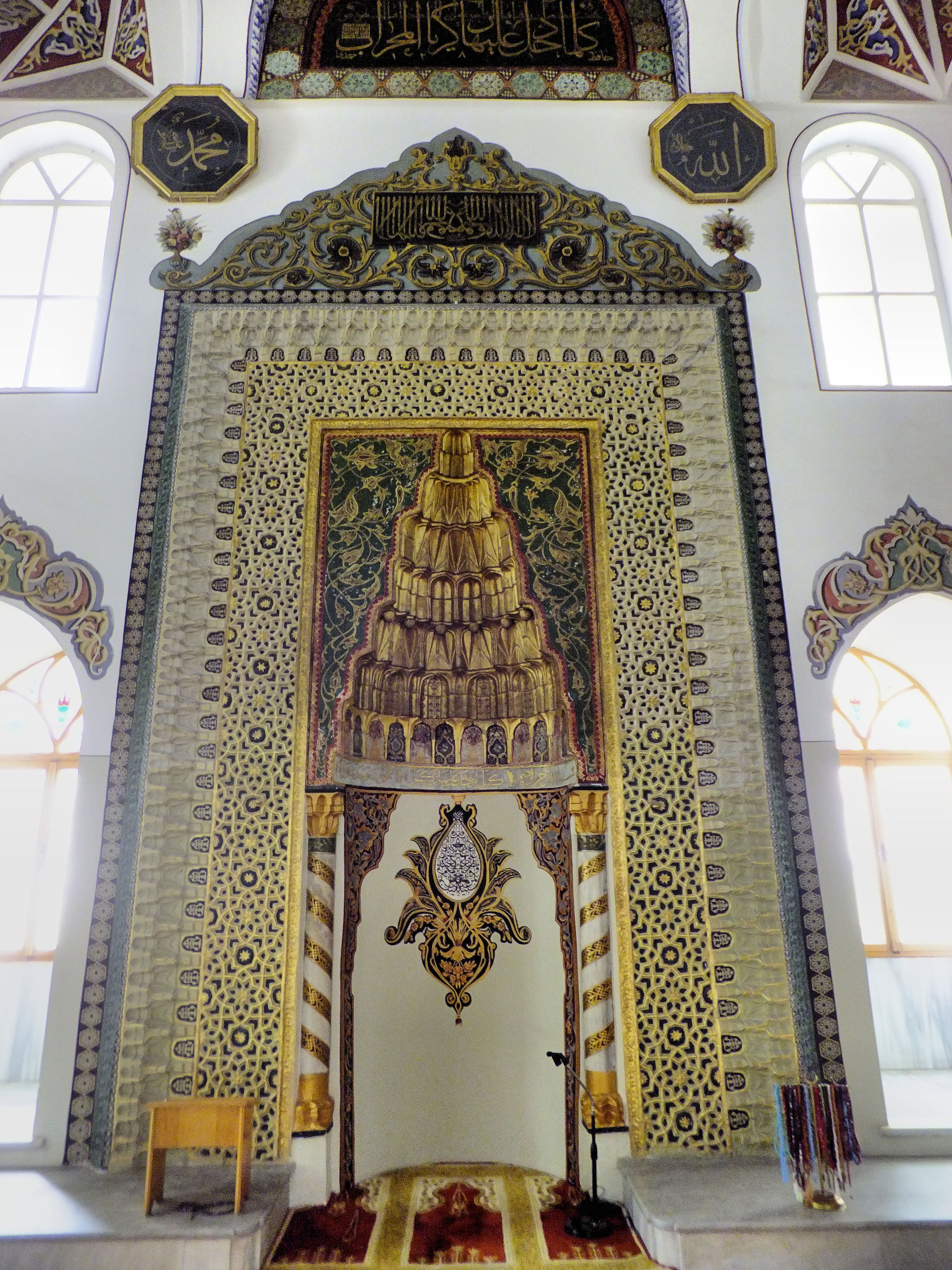
The mihrab

== Other parts of the complex ==
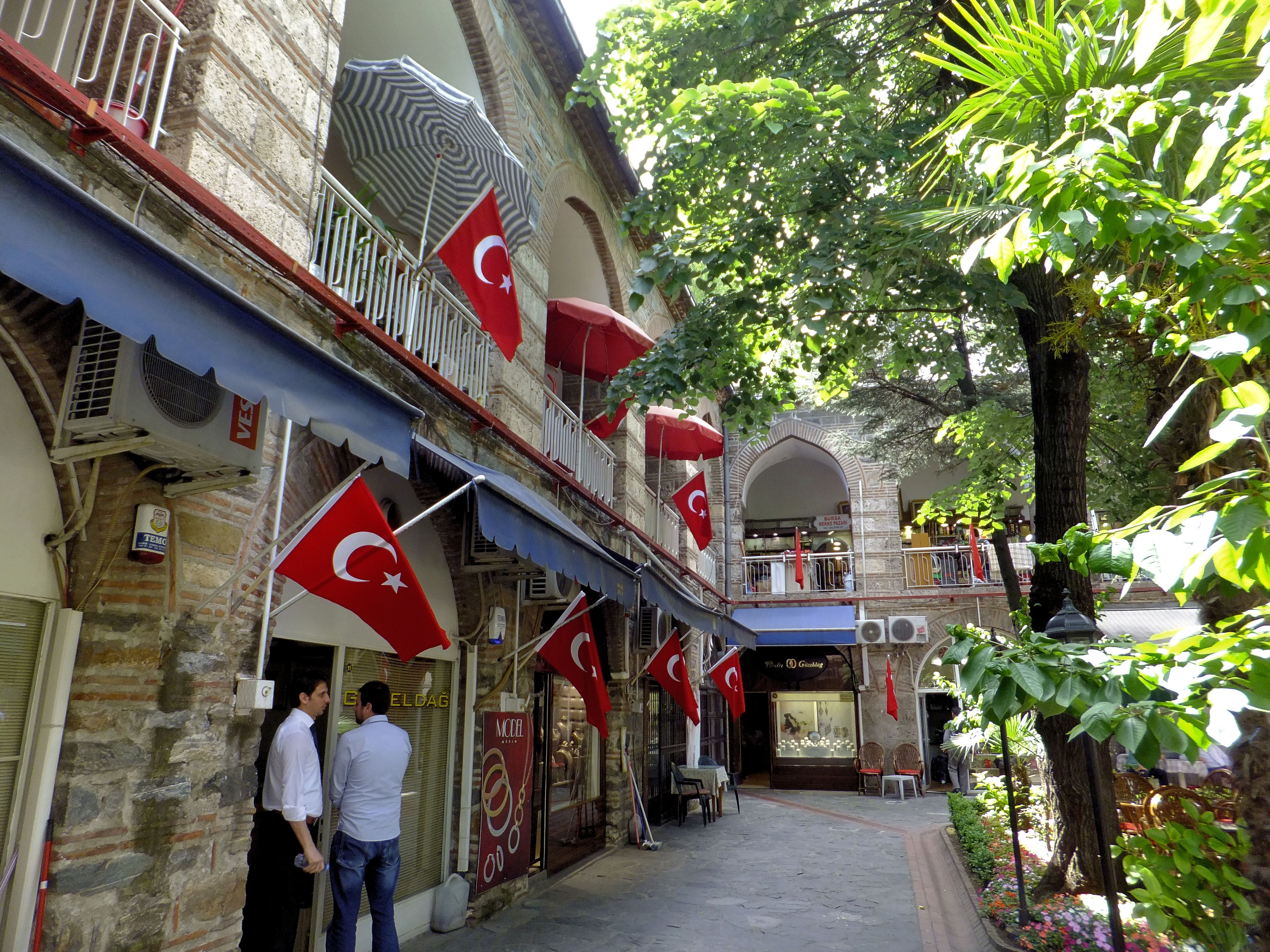
Interior of the Emir Han, a nearby caravanserai that was built to provide revenues for Orhan's religious complex

Like many important religious monuments built by the Ottomans, Orhan's mosque was part of a larger religious and charitable complex, or külliye. Of the other structures in this complex, only the mosque itself, the caravanserai (the Emir Han), and the hammam have survived. The mektep (primary school) was destroyed by the 1855 earthquake, the madrasa (Islamic college) once stood where the 19th-century Bursa town hall now stands, and the imaret (soup kitchen) stood nearby as late as 1907 but has since disappeared.

The Emir Han, an urban caravanserai (han), was originally built to provide revenues for Orhan's charitable complex. It still stands today within the bazaar district of Bursa, though it has been restored many times. It was damaged by fire in 1544 and repaired in 1634. Its gate was destroyed by an earthquake in 1674. The building was damaged again by fire in 1788 and damaged by the 1855 earthquake, and destroyed by a major fire in the bazaar district in 1958. It was restored in 1963. The building has a typical Ottoman caravanserai layout, consisting of a large central courtyard surrounded by a two-story gallery with rooms behind it, all covered by barrel vaults.

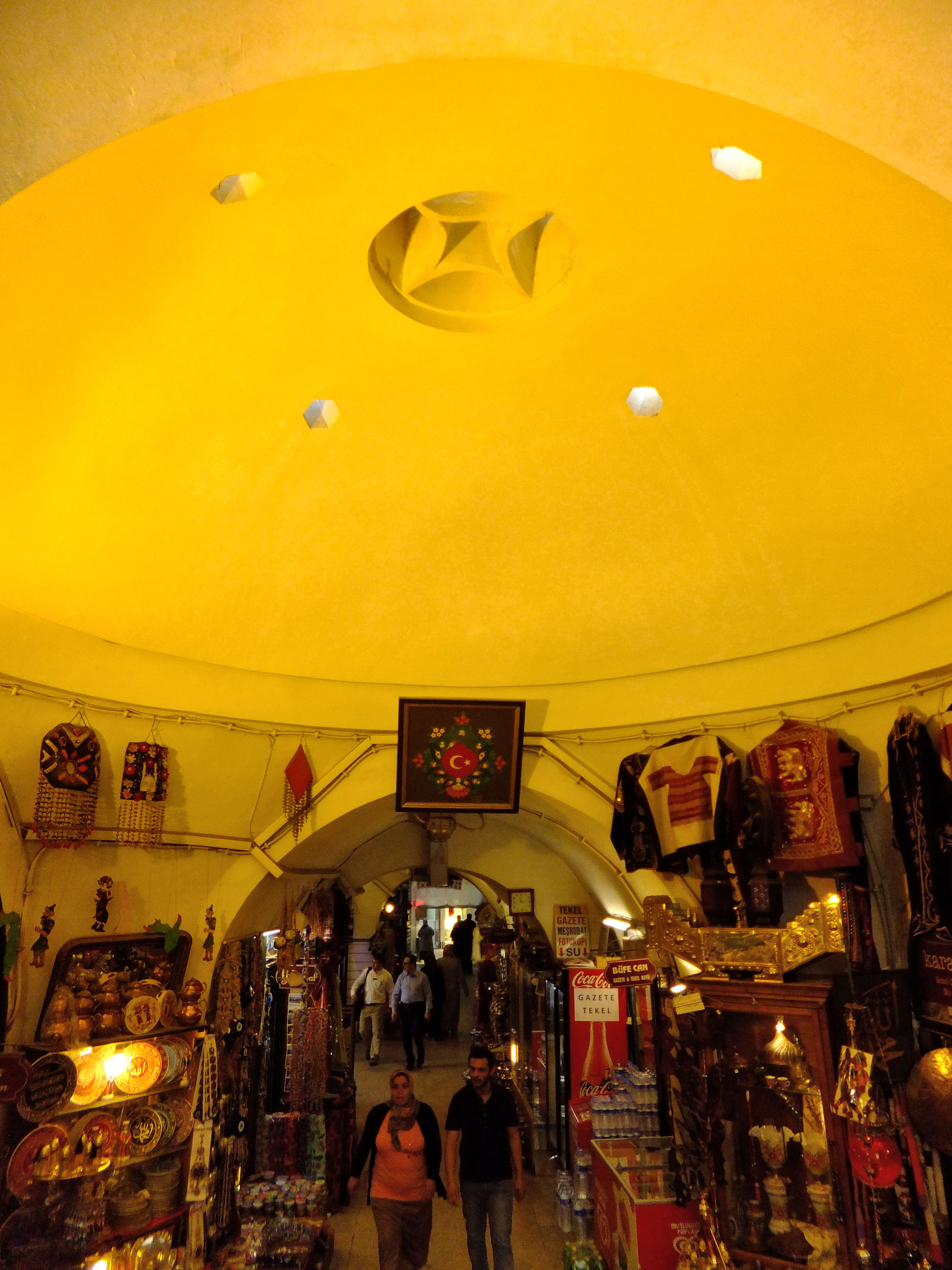
One of the domed chambers inside the former hammam of Orhan's complex, now a shopping complex

The hammam (public bathhouse) was a double hammam, meaning it had a men's section and a women's section built side-by-side. The men's section consists of a cold room, a warm room with attached latrines, a hot room with private rooms attached, and a furnace area. The women's section contains the same sequence but is smaller than the men's. After the 1958 fire, the hammam was converted into a shopping complex known today as Aynalı Çarşı ('Mirrored Bazaar'). Two new entrances were opened and some of the original elements, such as the furnace, were removed.
