= Kuruluş: Osman season 1 =

2019 Turkish television season

Kuruluş: Osman
- Season 1
- Official poster
- Starring: Burak Özçivit; Özge Törer; Nurettin Sönmez; Ragıp Savaş; Alma Terzić; Burak Çelik
- No. of episodes: 27

Release
- Original network: ATV
- Original release: 20 November 2019 – 24 June 2020

Season chronology
- Next → Season 2

The first season of the Turkish TV series, Kuruluş: Osman, created by Mehmet Bozdağ, premiered on 20 November 2019 and concluded on 24 June 2020.

== Plot ==
10 or 15 years after the Berke-Hulagu war, Ertuğrul Ghazi goes to Konya and he leaves his brother, Dündar Bey, in charge of his tribe. Dündar Bey is easily swayed by others into doing their misdeeds. He falls into the trap of the devious Selçuk Sançak Bey, Alişar, and the merciless princess of Kulucahisar, Sofia, who seeks to kill all the Turks. Osman, Dündar's nephew, can see through Alişar and Sofia's plans and warns him about them, despite his refusal to listen. As they continue to build more tension against the Kayı, Geyhatu sends Komutan Balgay to cause more trouble and stop the Kayı, especially Osman, from rebelling against the Mongols. Dündar, who bows down to the Mongols becoming the Sançak Bey, can't see Alişar's anger over his position being given over to him and he believes him when Alişar blames Osman for his son's killing. Soon after, along with the threat from Kulucahisar, Dündar is shown the truth, Alişar is beheaded by Osman, and Osman has married his love, Bala. Following this, after many difficulties, Balgay is presumably killed by Osman while Kulucahisar is conquered by the Kayı with Sofia's death happening in the process.

== Production ==
The season was written and produced by Mehmet Bozdağ and directed by Metin Günay. The theme music is by Alpay Göktekin and Zeynep Alasya.

=== Filming ===
It was filmed in a plateau set up in Riva, Beykoz. A separate part of the shooting location was reserved for the horses and animals of the series, where they lived in a natural environment and were looked after by their instructors. At the shooting location of the series, huge castles, inns, baths, mosques, churches were meticulously built to the finest detail. At the time when the series was first being filmed, 60 separate teams of carpenters were working on the plateau, the largest in Europe, and 1500 people were working feverishly for the first season. In the series, an 800-meter artificial lake was transformed into a huge river.

=== Casting ===
At first, when the series was named Diriliş: Osman, Aslıhan Karalar, the actress who played Burçin Hatun, was thought to play the role of Malhun Hatun, who didn't even appear in this season. The thought was established due to the fact that Malhun Hatun was Osman I's second wife according to history and that Aslıhan Karalar was the first young actress who was confirmed to join the series. However, in the series, Osman's first partner is Bala Hatun played by the Turkish actress Özge Törer. This was only revealed with the release of the series' first episode. Abdullah Peterson was supposed to play the villain Yannis, but it was later revealed that it was played by Tugrul Çetiner.

=== Music ===
The theme music is by Alpay Göktekin and Zeynep Alasya. Alpay Göktekin died on 5 May 2020, so therefore, could only compose the music for season one of the series.

== Release ==
The first trailer for the season was released on 14 October 2019. The second trailer was launched on 24 October 2019 and fans were waiting for the new series to finally be aired on 20 November 2019 on ATV (Turkey).

=== Reception ===
The season was well received in Turkey. In December 2019, Kuruluş: Osman attracted a record viewership on ATV, in its fourth weekend of broadcast, the 4th episode of the series recorded a countrywide rating of 14.46.

== Cast ==
Cast

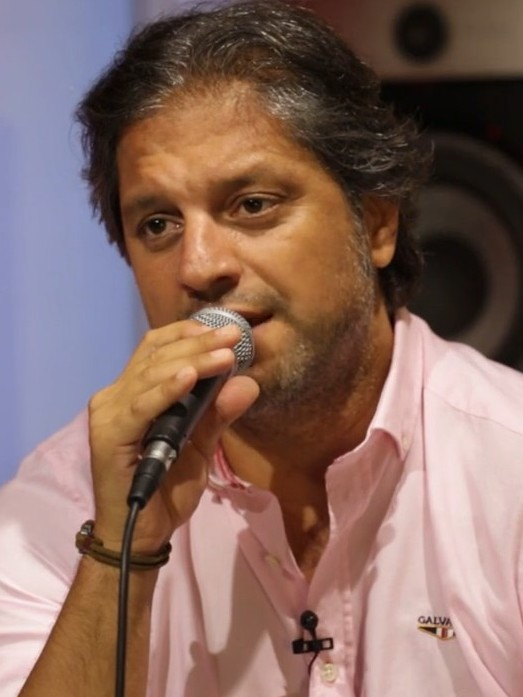
Ragıp Savaş (Dündar Bey)

=== Main characters ===
- Burak Özçivit as Osman Bey
- Özge Törer as Bala Hatun
- Yiğit Uçan as Boran Alp
- Ragıp Savaş as Dündar Bey
- Eren Vurdem as Konur Alp
- Alma Terzić as Prenses Sofia
- Nurettin Sönmez as Bamsı Beyrek
- Burak Çelik as Göktuğ Alp (formerly Kongar)

=== Supporting characters ===
- Didem Balçın as Selcan Hatun
- Eren Hacısalihoğlu as Batur Bey
- Ayşegül Günay Demir as Zöhre Hatun
- Buse Arslan as Aygül Hatun
- Çağkan Çulha as Bahadır Bey
- Seda Yıldız as Şeyh Edebali
- Emre Basalak as Gündüz Bey
- Yurdaer Okur as Balgay
- Emel Dede as Gonca Hatun
- Çağrı Şensoy as Cerkutay
- Latif Koru as Sıddık Alp (formerly Prens Salvador)
- Celal Al as Abdurrahman Gazi
- Tuğrul Çetiner as Efendi Yannis
- İsmail Hakkı Ürün as Samsa Çavuş
- Aslıhan Karalar as Burçin Hatun

=== Minor characters ===
- Tolga Akkaya as Dumrul Alp
- Ömer Ağan as Saltuk Alp
- Abdül Süsler as Komutan Kalanoz
- Mehmet Sabri Arafatoğlu as Demirci Bey
- Murat Karak as Şahin Bey
- Açelya Özcan as Ayşe Hatun
- Ayşen Gürler as Helen
- Uğur Aslan as Nizamettin
- Atilla Güzel as Ayaz Alp
- Şevket Çapkınoğlu as Megala
- Burak Sarımola as Komutan Andreas
- Volkan Başaran as Zorba
- Eray Türk as Melek
- Nizamettin Özkaya as Alexis
- Muammer Çagatay Keser as Kılıç Alp
- Kani Katkici as Erkut Alp
- Mete Deran as Çetin Alp
- Ercan Kabadayi as Boğaç Alp
- Kaya Demirkiran as Demirbüken Alp
- Kadir Terzi as Kanturali Alp
- Kadir Polatçi as Yaman Alp
- Fatih Osmanlı as Sancar Alp
- Ahmet Kılıç as Zülfikar Derviş
- Ali Sinan Demir as Dursun Fakıh
- Abidin Yerebakan as Akça Derviş

=== Guest characters ===
- Serdar Gökhan as Süleyman Şah
- Sezgin Erdemir as Sungurtekin Bey
- Yeşim Ceren Bozoğlu as Hazal Hatun
- Akbarxo'ja Rasulov as Noyan Subutay
- Atılgan Gümüş as Komutan Böke
- Yıldız Kültür as Şifacı Rabi'a Ana
- Sercan Sert as Theokoles
- Serkan Tatar as Pehlivan Derviş
- Serhan Onat as Aybars Bey
- Yaşar Aydınlıoğlu as Tekfur Yorgopolos
- Hazal Adıyaman as Princess Adelfa
- Selin Deveci as Aybüke Hatun
- Mehmet Ali Kaptanlar as the head of the White-Bearded Men.
- Kaan Tutkun as a Mongol commander
- Kuzey Yücehan as Komutan Köni
- Elif Cansu Akbiyik as Princess Adelfa's servant.
- Arslanbek Sultanbekov as the singer at Osman and Bala's wedding.
- Esra Bilgiç as Halime Sultan

== Episodes ==
No. overall	No. in season	Title	Directed by	Written by	Original release date	Turkey viewers (millions)
1	1	"Kuruluş Osman"	Metin Günay	Mehmet Bozdağ, Atilla Engin, Aslı Zeynep Peker Bozdağ and Ozan Bodur	20 November 2019	13.43
Dündar Bey, substitute Bey of the Kayı tribe, seeks peace with the Tekfur of Kulucahisar Castle, Yorgopolos, who is killed on the same day by his evil wife Sofia. The blame is pinned on Dündar's nephew, Osman Bey. Meanwhile, Bala, the daughter of Turkish Sheikh, Edebali, also attempts to recover some "entrustments" for her father.
2	2	"Kuruluş Vakti (Note: transl. "Time for Establishment")"	Metin Günay	Mehmet Bozdağ, Atilla Engin, Aslı Zeynep Peker Bozdağ and Ozan Bodur	27 November 2019	8.98
Bala finds the entrustments, however, Osman captures Bala while attempting to find Yorgopolos' killer and suspects her of killing him. Bala takes Osman to her father and Osman allies with Edebali and his organization, the Ahi brotherhood, against Sofia and her father, Yannis' evil organization, the "Margarit Monks". Sofia orders Theokles, her veteran warrior, to kill Osman.
3	3	"Kuruluş Ateşi (Note: transl. "The Fire of Establishment")"	Metin Günay	Mehmet Bozdağ, Atilla Engin, Aslı Zeynep Peker Bozdağ and Ozan Bodur	4 December 2019	7.91
In Theokles' ambush, Osman captures Theokles, only to be set free by Dündar's son, Batur. Theokles is later killed. Osman falls in love with Bala while Sofia, in search of the entrustments, enlists Prince Salvador to invade the Ahi bazaar. Bala is kidnapped due to this by him.
4	4	"Vatan Demek (Note: transl. "The Meaning of Homeland")"	Metin Günay	Mehmet Bozdağ, Atilla Engin, Aslı Zeynep Peker Bozdağ and Ozan Bodur	11 December 2019	14.46
Sofia orders Prince Salvador to take Bala to Yannis where she is constantly tortured by him in order for her to reveal the location of the entrustments but Osman later rescues her.
5	5	"Kuruluş Destanı (Note: transl. "The Establishment Epic")"	Metin Günay	Mehmet Bozdağ, Atilla Engin, Aslı Zeynep Peker Bozdağ and Ozan Bodur	18 December 2019	12.13
It is proven that Osman didn't kill the Tekfur. To assure Dündar, Sofia executes one of Yannis' men in front of him claiming that he was Yannis with the help of her father.
6	6	"Bu Yurt Bizim (Note: transl. "This is our Home")"	Metin Günay	Mehmet Bozdağ, Atilla Engin, Aslı Zeynep Peker Bozdağ and Ozan Bodur	25 December 2019	13.78
Selcan Hatun, Osman's aunt, arrives, she treats Osman as her own son and Osman treats her as his own mother. Osman asks her to go and ask Edebali for Bala's hand angering Dündar for Osman hadn't asked him. Osman falls into Prince Salvador's ambush and he and his alps are captured.
7	7	"Kuruluş Osman Vakti (Note: transl. "Time for Kuruluş: Osman")"	Metin Günay	Mehmet Bozdağ, Atilla Engin, Aslı Zeynep Peker Bozdağ and Ozan Bodur	8 January 2020	14.46
Batur, Dündar's son, rescues Osman for a reputation in the tribe after one of Salvador's men is tricked. Edebali declines Osman's proposal leaving him devastated and upset.
8	8	"Türkün Gayesi (Note: transl. "The Turks' Purpose")"	Metin Günay	Mehmet Bozdağ, Atilla Engin, Aslı Zeynep Peker Bozdağ and Ozan Bodur	15 January 2020	9.6
Sofia tasks her lover, Kalanoz, to kill Şeyh Edebali but is killed in this attempt by Osman. Bamsı, Osman's loyal companion, converts Salvador to Islam. Salvador's new name is Sıddık.
9	9	"Adalet (Note: transl. "Justice")"	Metin Günay	Mehmet Bozdağ, Atilla Engin, Aslı Zeynep Peker Bozdağ and Ozan Bodur	5 February 2020	13.57
Osman steals all the tax gold that was being transported illegally to Alişar Bey, the Selçuk Sançak Bey, by the Mongols. Yannis, disguised as a clairvoyant, proves to Alişar that Osman stole the gold. Alişar becomes an enemy of Osman.
10	10	"Şehitler Aşkına (Note: transl. "For the Love of Martyrs")"	Metin Günay	Mehmet Bozdağ, Atilla Engin, Aslı Zeynep Peker Bozdağ and Ozan Bodur	12 February 2020	12.71
Balgay, a Mongol commander, captures Söğüt and kills many women and children. He offers Osman that he will give him the Sançak Beylik and some more land if he was to become loyal to him. Osman rejects Balgay's offer.
11	11	"Türk Demek (Note: transl. "The Meaning of 'Turk'")"	Metin Günay	Mehmet Bozdağ, Atilla Engin, Aslı Zeynep Peker Bozdağ and Ozan Bodur	19 February 2020	14.24
Osman, with many difficulties, manages to escape the town with his alps. Balgay meets Yannis and Sofia and they decide to ally against Osman. Balgay even raids the Kayı tribe and has Osman's entire family in hostage until he comes. Konur, one of Osman's alps, also uncovers the fact that one of Balgay's men, Kongar, is his long-lost brother.
12	12	"Osman Bey"	Metin Günay	Mehmet Bozdağ, Atilla Engin, Aslı Zeynep Peker Bozdağ and Ozan Bodur	26 February 2020	16.87
Osman, who has met the Aksakals, arrives in the tribe and gives Balgay Genghis Han's dagger in order to leave him and his tribe alone. Osman tasks Salvador to spy for him in Kulucahisar Castle, however, the cunning Sofia still doesn't trust him too much. Meanwhile, the tribe council, mainly Dündar, decides to expel Osman for rebelling against the Mongols. Osman later recaptures Söğüt with his alps.
13	13	"Vatan (Note: transl. "Homeland")"	Metin Günay	Mehmet Bozdağ, Atilla Engin, Aslı Zeynep Peker Bozdağ and Ozan Bodur	4 March 2020	13.21
Dündar is given the Sançak Beylik, angering Alişar, and Osman takes back the dagger he gave to Balgay secretly through an operation at his camp, humiliating him in front of the Mongol leaders. Bala is wounded by some Mongols and now cannot produce a baby.
14	14	"Türk Olmak (Note: transl. "Being a Turk")"	Metin Günay	Mehmet Bozdağ, Atilla Engin, Aslı Zeynep Peker Bozdağ and Ozan Bodur	11 March 2020	12.2
Osman falls into Balgay, Dündar, and Batur's trap but is saved when Geyhatu, the Mongol Viceroy, sends Commander Köni to take Osman to him. Balgay later tasks his right-hand men, Cerkutay and Kongar to kill Köni and they succeed, however, Osman also escapes with the help of Bamsı.
15	15	"Şehitler Ölmez (Note: transl. "Martyrs Don't Die")"	Metin Günay	Mehmet Bozdağ, Atilla Engin, Aslı Zeynep Peker Bozdağ and Ozan Bodur	18 March 2020	17.8
After he kidnaps Sofia, Osman tells Yannis that he can have his daughter back if he asked Balgay to come to his castle, in the way he would ambush him. The ambush is successful but Batur is killed by Alişar, who has the intention of making Dündar and Osman fight.
16	16	"Türk Teslim Olmaz (Note: transl. "Turks Don't Surrender")"	Metin Günay	Mehmet Bozdağ, Atilla Engin, Aslı Zeynep Peker Bozdağ and Ozan Bodur	25 March 2020	15.41
Alişar pins the blame on Osman resulting in Dündar attacking Osman during the ambush. In Dündar's attack, Alişar, who is hidden behind the trees, aims at killing Osman with his arrow but accidentally hits Dündar instead. Balgay escapes but Gündüz, Osman's elder brother, successfully becomes the new substitute Bey of the Kayı tribe.
17	17	"Yeni Bir Nizam (Note: transl. "A New Order")"	Metin Günay	Mehmet Bozdağ, Atilla Engin, Aslı Zeynep Peker Bozdağ and Ozan Bodur	1 April 2020	10.44
After his meeting with the Aksakals, Osman saves Princess Adelfa, a Byzantine princess being forced to marry Geyhatu. After saving her, he takes her to his tribe and asks Bala and Selcan to take special care of her.
18	18	"Bir Olacağız (Note: transl. "We Will Be One")"	Metin Günay	Mehmet Bozdağ, Atilla Engin, Aslı Zeynep Peker Bozdağ and Ozan Bodur	22 April 2020	9.92
Zöhre, Dündar's devious wife who even had Gündüz kidnapped by Balgay earlier, plans to take Adelfa to Alişar in spite of Bala and Selcan through her adoptive daughter, Burçin.
19	19	"Başaracağız (Note: transl. "We Will Succeed")"	Metin Günay	Mehmet Bozdağ, Atilla Engin, Aslı Zeynep Peker Bozdağ and Ozan Bodur	29 April 2020	13.43
Kongar reverts to Islam and becomes Göktug after a contract is shown to him that he was actually bought by Balgay from a slave-trader. Meanwhile, Osman is tasked by the Aksakals to save his uncle, Sungurtekin, who was spying for them in the Margarit Monks and his betrayal is now caught, Osman succeeds and embraces his thought-dead uncle.
20	20	"Destanlar Yazacağız (Note: transl. "We Will Write Epics")"	Metin Günay	Mehmet Bozdağ, Atilla Engin, Aslı Zeynep Peker Bozdağ and Ozan Bodur	6 May 2020	7.45
Osman ambushes Dündar and Zöhre, who were taking their daughter, Aygül, to get her married to Alişar, he sought to show them that he didn't kill Batur. He trusts Aygül that she believed him that he didn't kill Batur, however, as she didn't trust him from the start, when she is let go, she tells Alişar everything and asks him to save her parents. Later, Aygül's parents are freed because of her betrayal.
21	21	"Kuruluş Ruhu (Note: transl. "The Soul of Establishment")"	Metin Günay	Mehmet Bozdağ, Atilla Engin, Aslı Zeynep Peker Bozdağ and Ozan Bodur	13 May 2020	17.51
Balgay captures Osman while Böke, the Mongol commander who informed the monks about Sungurtekin's betrayal, supposedly allies with Balgay to save his life, however, with the help of Göktug, disguised as Kongar, Osman escapes but is severely wounded by arrows.
22	22	"Kutlu Rüya (Note: transl. "A Blessed Dream")"	Metin Günay	Mehmet Bozdağ, Atilla Engin, Aslı Zeynep Peker Bozdağ and Ozan Bodur	20 May 2020	11.48
Göktug continues to spy for Osman at Balgay's camp while Osman recovers with the help of Şeyh Edebali and sees a dream which results in Edebali allowing Osman to marry Bala.
23	23	"Kutlu Yol (Note: transl. "A Blessed Path")"	Metin Günay	Mehmet Bozdağ, Atilla Engin, Aslı Zeynep Peker Bozdağ and Ozan Bodur	27 May 2020	13.47
Osman tasks Gündüz and Bala to invade Alişar's mansion where they are successful. Meanwhile, Osman captures Alişar when he is away and forces him to reveal to Dündar that he killed Batur. After seeing this, Dündar begs for forgiveness. Böke also dies in an ambush and Osman takes Alişar to the tribe and is ready to behead him only to be stopped by Geyhatu's commander, Subutay.
24	24	"Zafer Milletindir (Note: transl. "The Nation of Victory")"	Metin Günay	Mehmet Bozdağ, Atilla Engin, Aslı Zeynep Peker Bozdağ and Ozan Bodur	3 June 2020	12.46
Osman ignores Subutay's threats and beheads Alişar. Sofia escapes the Emperor who sentenced Yannis and most of the Margarit Monks to death. Hazal, (Note: Hazal is even more devious than Zöhre, she comes with a big plan to help her brother, Yavlak Arslan, in his plans to take over Söğüt and the Kayı tribe.) Dündar's first wife, arrives and kills Zöhre for poisoning Osman and Bala's wedding food, which was given to her indirectly through Sofia. Meanwhile, Balgay finds out that Göktug has been betraying him and gives him a potion that messes up his memory and changes him into Kongar again.
25	25	"Bizim Vatanımız (Note: transl. "Our Homeland")"	Metin Günay	Mehmet Bozdağ, Atilla Engin, Aslı Zeynep Peker Bozdağ and Ozan Bodur	10 June 2020	13.81
Aygül is currently mentally ill after she learnt the truth about Alişar. Sıddık's betrayal is caught by Sofia and thus he is martyred while Subutay allies with Balgay and Sofia to destroy the Kayı tribe in an attack. Osman, who is aware of the attack, prepares for it and therefore, Subutay's plans backfire.
26	26	"Vatan Sevdamız (Note: transl. "Our Love for our Homeland")"	Metin Günay	Mehmet Bozdağ, Atilla Engin, Aslı Zeynep Peker Bozdağ and Ozan Bodur	17 June 2020	10.2
Subutay is beheaded, however, Sofia escapes with the help of Balgay. Kongar becomes a Muslim again after remembering everything but bids farewell to Konur, who was accidentally killed by him when he was drunk with the potion. In an epic showdown, Balgay is supposedly killed by Osman along with the supposed death of Cerkutay by Göktug in the presence of Sofia and her 'dark knights', a special sort of knights, who keep on fighting till they die. However, Cerkutay manages to survive the attack.
27	27	"Zafer Günü (Note: transl. "The Day of Victory")"	Metin Günay	Mehmet Bozdağ, Atilla Engin, Aslı Zeynep Peker Bozdağ and Ozan Bodur	24 June 2020	11.41
The 'dark knights' injure Osman very badly and everyone believes he is dead, however, Osman is actually alive but he only tells Gündüz, Bala and Selcan. Taking advantage, Osman conquers Kulucahisar Castle and kills Sofia in the process. Aygül, who is mentally ill, attempts to kill Hazal because she killed her mother, however, the arrow accidentally kills Burçin instead.
