= List of Kuruluş: Osman characters =

This is a list of characters appearing in Kuruluş Osman, a Turkish TV series created by Mehmet Bozdağ. It focused on the life of Osman I, founder of the Ottoman Empire. Osman is portrayed by Burak Özçivit.

Some of the characters are based on people related to Osman I, including Rabia Bala Hatun, Sheikh Edebali, Malhun Hatun, Ertuğrul and Köse Mihal along with fictional characters adapted from the Book of Dede Korkut, such as Selcan Hatun and Bamsı Beyrek.

Every season saw additions to the cast. In the first season, Alma Terzić [tr] and Eren Vurdem joined the cast. In Season 2, Erkan Avcı, Yıldız Çağrı Atiksoy and Kanbolat Görkem Arslan were credited. In Season 3 Serhat Kiliç played Tekfur Michael Kosses, a relative of the emperor, Tekfur of Harmankaya Castle, the most noble and powerful tekfur of Bithinya, and owner of the principality of Harmankay.

== Main characters ==
=== Osman Bey ===
Osman (Burak Özçivit; seasons 1–6) is the third and youngest son of Ertuğrul Ghazi and Halime Hatun. He is also the younger brother of Gündüz Bey and Savcı Bey, and nephew of Selcan Hatun, whom he treats as his mother. He is the husband of Bala Hatun and Malhun Hatun, and the father of Orhan, Alaeddin Ali Pasha, Fatma Hatun and Halime Hatun and father-in-law of Elcim Hatun, Gonca Hatun (Yakup Bey's daughter) and Holofira Hatun. He aspires to follow his father Ertuğrul and his grandfather Süleyman Şah. He is attentive to his surroundings and good with a sword, like his father. He also disobeys his beys, like his father, choosing his own path. His weakness is his care for those close to him, making him prone to traps. He humiliates his enemies on the battlefield and while negotiating with them, stoking a thirst for revenge. He is elected Bey of the Kayı tribe in Season 2. He decides to marry a second wife (Malhun Hatun) as per his father's will, and also changes the Kayı flag. He continues his struggle for his free realm by conquering castles like Kulucahisar, Marmaracik, Koyunhisar, Köprühisar, Yarhisar, Bilecik (İnhisar), Inegol, territory of Yenişehir, Itburnu, Lefke, Kestel, Kite, Atranos, Karaçabeş, Goynuk, Mudurnu and Mekece and Karadin Castle. He also has Karacahisar castle and Soğut and Domaniç that was conquered by his father Ertuğrul. He now has determination of conquering Bursa. He is a true warrior who is very fierce toward his enemies and a kind ruler for his people no matter from which religion they belong. He finally announces his free state "Osmanli Beyliğı (Ottoman Beylik) approved by white bearded organization (Aksakals) in season 5.Based on Osman I.

=== Bala Hatun ===
Bala (Özge Törer; seasons 1–6), the first wife of Osman Bey, is the daughter of Şeyh Edebali and Ulduz Hatun, who died of a disease, daughter in law of Ertuğrul Bey and Halime Sultan, the sister-in-law of Dursun Fakih through her unknown sister. She is the mother of Alaeddin Ali and Halime Hatun, Step-mother of Orhan Bey and Fatma Hatun. She is mother-in-law of Gonca Hatun (Yakup Bey's daughter) and step-mother-in-law of Elcim Hatun and Holofira Hatun. She is the Chief Lady (Hanım/Baş Hatun) of the Kayi tribe and the head of the Bacıyân-ı Rûm (succeeding Aygul). She is a painter who is loyal to her father, her husband, the Ahi brotherhood, and Selcan Hatun. She was best friends with Gonca Hatun (deceased). She is calm and patient, but is prone to heartbreak. A Mongol stabbed her in Season 1, leaving her infertile and the subject of teasing. In Season 2, after her husband is elected bey, she becomes baş hatun of the Kayı tribe, succeeding Selcan Hatun. She is upset when Osman decides to marry a second wife, due to his late father's will, although she accepts her fate. She attempts to find him a wife, which leads to her meeting with Aksu Hatun, whom Osman rejects because she is not the daughter of a bey. Aksu is later killed by Targun Hatun, who loved Osman but seeks revenge on him after he exiles her for poisoning Bala. Targun regarded Bala as an obstacle preventing her marriage to Osman. Later on, Targun kidnaps Bala from the tribe but she kills Targun with the help of Göktuğ. After that, Bala had tensions with Malhun Hatun, who later becomes Osman's second wife, although Bala and Malhun accept each other later on. Bala later becomes pregnant and gives birth to Osman's second son Alaeddin Ali. Two months after the victory of İnegöl, she learns that she is expecting again and later gives birth to a daughter, Halime. In the first episode of Season 5, Bala's daughter, Halime is deceased, and Bala Hatun has a terrible disease. She eventually recovers. She is a warrior lady who is always at the forefront of conquests and wars supporting her husband Osman. Özge Törer won the Best Actress of the Year award at the Crystal Globe Awards for her performance. The character is based on Rabia Bala Hatun.

=== Malhun Hatun ===
Malhun (Yıldız Çağrı Atiksoy; Seasons 2–5), is the daughter of Ömer Bey, the second wife of Osman Bey, daughter-in-law of Ertugrul Ghazi and Halime Sultan, mother of Orhan and Fatma Hatun. Step-mother of Alaeddin Ali Bey and Halime Hatun. She is Mother-in-law of Elcim Hatun, Holofira Hatun and step mother-in-law of Gonca Hatun (Yaqup Bey's daughter). She is the Chief Lady (Hanım/Baş Hatun) of the Bayindir tribe and Yenisehir. She belongs to the Bayındır tribe, an Oğuz tribe settled in Ankara suffering persecution from Geyhatu. The tribe consists of 10,000 people and seeks to settle in Bithynia on Osman's invitation, which was one of the reasons why Malhun comes. She is skilled in archery and combat. She has a noble lineage of Beys formerly loyal to the Selçuk State and Sultan Alaeddin Keykubat. In the beginning she has tense relations with Bala, but eventually they get along. She is sent by her father to examine the western borders of the state. She discovers Dündar's ring in Söğüt, and attempts to find the traitors in the Kayı tribe herself. Osman then initiates a major battle with the Byzantines, with the support of Malhun Hatun which is historically known as the Battle of Domanic. She later marries Osman Bey after Osman is advised by Seyh Edebali to marry another woman to get an heir for his beylik and becomes pregnant soon after. She gives birth to Osman's first child Orhan. She administers Yenişehir trade. She is a brave hatun, supporting her husband Osman in battlefields and also accompanies him on his conquests. She is Devlet Ana of Ottoman Empire. At almost the end of Season 4 she is revealed to be pregnant with Osman's fifth child. Actress Yıldız Çağrı Atiksoy won Golden Palm Awards 2021 in the category of Best TV Series actress for her role as Malhun Hatun . Based on Malhun Hatun.

=== Orhan Bey ===
Orhan (Aybars Kartal Ozson supporting in seasons 3–4; Emre Bey, starring in season 5–6) is the eldest son of Osman and Malhun Hatun. Step-son of Bala Hatun. He was born to the joy of Osman and whole Kayi Tribe as the birth of Osman's heir was long-awaited. Elder brother of Alaeddin Ali, Fatma Hatun and Halime Hatun. Husband of Elcim Hatun and Nilufer Hatun. He is the Bey of Karachisar and Karaçebes Castle. He is a skilled fighter and a brave warrior, just like his father, and he always protects his siblings. He often goes to fights and battles along with Osman and his alps. He is in love with Holofira but later weds Elcim Hatun to strengthen the political alliance between the two Kayi Tribes. Later loses his wife and unborn child in unfortunate circumstances. He rescued Holofira from her forced marriage and married her. Based on Orhan, the 2nd sultan of the Ottoman Empire.

=== Alaeddin Ali ===
Alaeddın Alı Bey (Yaman Çınar Balcı, supporting in seasons 3–4; Ömer Faruk Aran, starring in season 5-6 ) is the miraculous son of Osman and his first wife Bala Hatun. Step-son of Malhun Hatun. Younger brother of Orhan. Elder brother of Fatma Hatun and Halime Hatun. Husband of Gonca Hatun. He is the Bey of Akhisar Castle. He studied in a Madrasah and is well-versed in both deen and medicine. He is very brave, noble, wise and smart like his parents and grandfather. He also sometimes accompanies his father and brother in wars. He is very attached to his mother, Bala Hatun. He is in love with Gonca Hatun, daughter of Yakup Bey whom he married secretly and had a daughter named Hayme who was still born. Based on Alaeddın Alı Bey.

=== Boran Bey ===
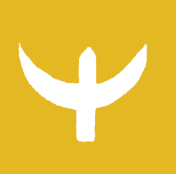
Flag of the Kayı tribe under Osman Bey's rule

Boran (Yiğit Uçan; starring in seasons 1–TBD) is one of Osman Bey's main supporters. He is the widower of Gonca Hatun and a close companion of late Konur and late Göktuğ, late Dumrul, Gence Bey and Cerkutay. He is a talented bard and singer. He uses a sword. He is skilled in archery, and often also uses a bow and arrow in close combat. In Season 3, he is devastated after the death of Gonca Hatun and he goes insane for a while. Later on he takes his revenge by killing Julia. He allies with Konur Alp to support Osman Bey when Gunduz Bey took over Kayi Beylik. Evolves over time with Osman bey and is with his children and him most of the time. Later falls in love with Esrigun Hatun in Season 4. At the end of Season 4 Osman made him the Bey of Koprihisar castle.

=== Cerkutay Bey ===
Cerkutay (Çağrı Şensoy) (seasons 1-TBD)is one of Balgay's former men. He laughs at everything. He is friends with Göktug. After Balgay was killed by Osman, he was taken to the Kayi tribe and became an alp. Later, he converts to Islam after being moved by Osman praying in Season 1 and with guidance from Seyh Edebali. He likes to joke around, particularly with Boran Alp and Göktuğ Alp. He has a keen appetite for food and drink, often eating and drinking excessively. He is the Widower of Aygul Hatun, and the step father of Kayı Alp. In Season 4 he married Ulgen Hatun and they have a son named Cerkutay Jr (Gazi Alp).

=== Konur Bey ===
Berk Ercer (starring in seasons 3–5) as Konur Alp / Sarkis. He was a Seljuk commander who was the right-hand man of Vizier Alemshah. He has a scar on the left side of his face. Later had a change of heart by Seyh Edebali and sided with Osman Bey. He is a skilled warrior and best at carrying out secret missions. At the end of Season 4 Osman made him the Bey of Koyunhisar castle. Not be confused with Season 1 Konur Alp. Based on Konur Alp.

=== Turgut Bey ===
Turgut (Ruzgar Aksoy; starring seasons 3-4) is a Turk nobleman. Husband of Princess Mari. Is the bey of his own tribe called Turgut Bey Tribe. Initially, he had tense relations with Osman Bey. But they eventually get along and he became a good friend of Osman and he helped him in his conquests. Turgut Bay raids the caravan of Kosess's sister, Mari and takes her to his tribe. While bringing her food, he saves her from a snake bite and then reveals his reason for capturing her is to use her as a bargaining chip to get back his own alps that were captured by Kosses. A series of events happen, while Turgut and Mari falls in love with each other. They prepare for a wedding at Kayi tribe but on the night before their wedding day, she was kidnapped from the Kayi tribe, and so Turgut attempts to find her. He rescues her from Inegol Castle just on time before Nikola attempts to kill her by stabbing her and takes her back to his tribe. When Kosses finds out, he realised his mistakes and lets Turgut Bey marry Mari in Harmankaya. Osman gave him Inegol Castle. He went to Gazan Han with Seyh Edebali in the end of Season 4 and did not appear in Season 5.

=== Dündar Bey ===
Dundar (Ragıp Savaş; seasons 1–2) was the youngest son of Süleyman Şah and Hayme Hatun. The youngest brother of Sungurtekin Bey and Ertuğrul Ghazi, and the youngest adoptive brother of Selcan Hatun. Husband of Hazal Hatun and widower of Zöhre Hatun. Father of Aygül, Batur (deceased) and Bahadır, adoptive father of Saltuk Alp. Uncle of Gündüz, Savcı and Osman. He is easily swayed by others. He was made substitute Bey while Ertuğrul Ghazi was on a mission in Konya. When the Mongols attacked, he preferred to bow down to them rather than fight, angering those who were close to Osman Bey. Tries to take over Gündüz's Beylik when he became the Bey instead of him and helps the Mongols against Osman Bey. Is manipulated by his wives. He became the Selçuk Sançak Bey, a Selçuk operative figure, for a while after he allied with the Mongols. He later accepts his mistakes and begs for forgiveness but was punished by Ertuğrul and sent out of the tribe for a while into Söğüt. He respects and is loyal to his older brother, Ertuğrul Ghazi. Later in Season 2, when Ertuğrul is on his death bed, he decides to betray his brother and nephews in order to seize the Kayı Beylik. He is angered when Osman becomes the Bey, collaborating with anyone against Osman including the Byzantines like Nikola. He is eventually caught and then shot by an arrow by Osman for his treachery. Based on Dündar Bey.

=== Aya Nikola ===
Nikola (Erkan Avcı; starring seasons 2–3) was one of the best commanders in the Byzantine Empire, much like Diriliş: Ertuğrul's Dragos. He was Komutan Flatyos's and Helen's best friend. He is an atheist, unlike his Christian counterparts. Nikola aspired to follow Julius Caesar's footsteps and is skilled in pottery and making sculptures. He doesn't let the Kayı tribe live a second with peace, starting with a plague to briefly occupying Kulucahisar twice. Nikola seeks to become Emperor. He seeks to start a big war with the Turkish tribes, with the help of the Templars, Geyhatu and the Cuman Turks. In Season 3, he teams up with Tekfur Michael Kosses of Harmankaya and Tekfur Rogatus Laskaris of Bilecik. He also falls in love with Kosses's sister Prenses Mari and wants to marry her for his own political reasons. However, after Mari falls in love with Turgut, he abducted Mari from the Kayi tribe with the help of Gunduz Bey through Vizier Alemshah. When she refused to marry him, he attempted to kill Mari by stabbing her and then Turgut comes just in time to save her. At the end of Season 3 after losing Inegol Castle to Kayi, he was beheaded by Osman. Nikola was taken from a historical character.

=== Prenses Sofia ===
Alma Terzić as Prenses Sofia (transl. Princess Sofia(Seasons 1& 6): The princess of Kulucahisar and Efendi Yannis's evil daughter as well as Kalanoz's lover. She cheated on her husband, Tekfur Yorgopolos, and then kills him. The Margarit Monks sought to make her the Empress of Byzantium. She appears to be a lovely princess at first but later reveals herself to be evil, cunning, and merciless. Her only aim is to take back the holy entrustment from Şeyh Edebali and help her father in his evil plans. She is severely injured by Osman at the end of Season 1 during the Conquest of Kulucahisar and is thought dead by everyone. She surprisingly returns in Season 5 Episode 169 after many years aiming to end the Turks and Osman after being saved by Helen who took her to Constantinople. She kidnapped the daughter of Osman and Bala, Halime and brainwashed her and brought her up as Poena to torture Osman and Bala.

=== Goktug Alp ===
Burak Çelik (seasons 1–3) as Göktug Alp. Göktug (formerly Kongar) was one of Osman Bey's main Alps and his best friend. He was formerly right-hand man and Balgay's adoptive son, and Konur Alp's long-lost younger brother. He became a "Mankurt" (brainwashed Mongol) after his tribe was raided after which he was given to a slave trader. He reverted to Islam after he saw a letter from the Emperor confirming Balgay had bought him from the slave market. He was recaptured by Balgay who again brainwashed him with the use of his shaman. After killing his brother, the devastated Göktug reverted to Islam once again. In Season 2, He became the Alpbaşı (transl. Chief Alp) of the Kayı tribe after Osman became the Bey. Osman told him to pretend to betray him and exiled him so he could work with Targun. When Bala was captured by Targun, he helped Bala escape and kill Targun and to reunite with Osman. After Targun's death, he became the leader of the Cuman Turks. He also had tense relations with Turhan Alp as he was concerned about traitors in the Kayi tribe. He was initially in love with Zoe but then she was caught as a traitor who was working for Nikola. In Season 3, he falls in love with Hera who was Governor Saguros's daughter. Later, he was martyred by Geyhatu Han, during an ambush when they were being taken to Sultan Mesud in Konya, devastating Osman Bey and his Alps.

=== Fatma Hatun ===
Fatima Hatun (Cemre Demircan, starring in seasons 3–4 as Child Fatima; Leya Kırşan, starring in season 5–6 as Teen Fatima) is the daughter of Osman Bey and Malhun Hatun. Step-daughter of Bala Hatun. She is the younger sister of Orhan and Alaeddin Ali and the older sister of Halime Hatun. She is very much attached to her father Osman Bey and also takes so much interest in the lives of her brothers. Bala Hatun later gives Fatma Hatun the duty of training the Baciler (female warriors/sisters) and her joy is beyond limits.

=== Holofira Hatun (later Nilüfer Hatun) ===
Holofira Hatun(Ecem Sena Bayir, starring seasons 5–6): Step-daughter of Yarihisar Tekfur. Niece of Tekfur Olivia of Atranos. Second wife of Orhan Bey. Daughter-in-law of Osman Bey and Malhun Hatun. Comes to Yenisehir after Orhan raided her caravan to prove his bravery to Sancaksizlar. In love with Orhan Bey with whom she met in her childhood. Is close friends with Gonca Hatun. Despite being Christian she is very sympathetic towards Orhan's family, Turks and the oppressed people. She helped Osman and Malhun in conquering Kestel Castle and releasing Orhan from its dungeons. She has good relations with Orhan's family, made a lot of sacrifices for the Kayi even helping them in conquering Byzantines Castles. When she was held captive under the allegation of poisoning Ayca Hatun, she asked Malhun Hatun to summon Yunus Emre to seek guidance about Islam. She is a brave girl who knows how to fight and defend herself. In Season 6, Orhan abducted her from her forced marriage, and they finally got married after a lot of obstacles. She converts to Islam after having a dream about it, and renamed Nilüfer Hatun by her father in law, Osman Bey. Based on Nilüfer Hatun, concubine of Orhan Gazi and first Valide Hatun of the Ottoman Empire.

=== Gonca Hatun ===
Gonca Hatun (Belgin Şimşek, starring seasons 5–6): Daughter of Yakup Bey and Saadet Hatun. Younger sister of Mehmet Bey. Wife of Alaeddin Ali Bey and daughter-in-law of Osman Bey and Bala Hatun, sister-in-law of Orhan Bey, Fatma Hatun and Halime Hatun. Being a good fighter, and a skilled tradeswomen are some of the many qualities she learned and acquired while being brought up as the daughter of a bey. She is in love with Alaeddin Ali. She is always curious about him and once got shot by an arrow while saving Alaeddin. She was used by her mother to spy on Alaeddin, which results in temporary misunderstandings. She admires Osman Bey and his merciness and adores his supporting and strong family. She was engaged to Ahmet Bey, of Candaroĝlu Tribe against her will but she married Alaeddin Ali, against her family's wishes. She is disowned by her family for marrying Alaeddin. After the death of Elcim Hatun and her child, Gonca became paranoid and so anxious about her own child even feeling alone. Her daughter Hayme was still born due to being poisoned by Byzantines which led her to turn against Holofira.

=== Others ===
This is a list of main characters who starred in one season:

==== Season 1 ====
- Eren Vurdem as Konur Alp: One of Osman Bey's most trusted men and one of his main Alps. Konur was very skilled in one-to-one combat with daggers. His tribe was raided by Mongols, causing his parents to have died and he and his younger brother Göktug to have separated. He was martyred by Göktug, his brother, who was manipulated by Balgay as Kongar for the second time.
- Tuğrul Çetiner as Efendi Yannis: (disguised as a fortune-teller named Abdul and a Dervish) - Head of a secret Templar order called the 'Margarit Monks' who seek to kill all Turks and turn the Byzantine empire into a Catholic country again. He is the father of Princess Sofia. Towards the end of season 1, he is said to be killed by the Emperor under unknown circumstances.

==== Season 2 ====
- Tamer Yiğit as Ertuğrul Bey (also known as Ertuğrul Gazi): The third son of Süleyman Şah and second biological son of Hayme Hatun, he was the brother of Gundogdu Bey, Sungurtekin Bey and Dündar Bey and adoptive brother of Selcan Hatun and Bamsı Beyrek. He is the widower of Halime Hatun, and the father of Gündüz Bey, Savcı Bey and Osman Bey. He was the father-in-law of Ayse Hatun, Lena Hatun, Malhun Hatun and Bala Hatun. grandfather of Bayhoca bey, Aydogdu Bey, Aktemur Bey, Ertugrul Bey Jr (via Savci Bey), Orhan Bey, Alaeddin Bey, Fatma Hatun, and Halime Hatun.The long-serving Bey of the Kayı tribe. He was usually ill. A highly respected leader among the Turks. He died when he was about to announce his heir. Based on Ertuğrul.
- Maruf Otajonov as Geyhatu: The Viceroy (or Governor) of Anatolia under the İlhanlı (Ilkhanate). Grandson of Hulagu Han and great-great-grandson of Genghis Khan. He loves his son, Möngke, despite him wanting to kill him to become the Viceroy and then the İlhan (ruler) of the İlhanlı. He intended to marry Princess Adelfa to create an alliance between the İlhanlı and the Byzantine Empire. Based on Gaykhatu

==== Season 3 ====
- Serhat Kilic as Tekfur Michael Kosses: Byzantine tekfur of Harmankaya, owner of its lands and principality, and a member of Palaiologos family. He is a relative of the Byzantine emperor and the most noble and powerful tekfur of Bithinya, a skilled fighter, a shrewd politician, and a skillful administrator. Loves his sister more than anything, and is devastated after Mari's death. He was a close ally of Tekfur Rogatus, Osman's most powerful ally and considers him his friend. In Season 2, he orders Bahadir Alp to kill Osman's black horse, Karayel. With Osman and Seyh Edebali's guidance soon embraces Islam. Osman sends him to Bursa for secret mission. Based on Köse Mihal.
- Taner Turan as Vizier Alemshah: Sultanate of Rûm vizier. He is evil by nature. He has a personality similar to Dirilis Ertugrul's Emir Sadettin Kopek. He often collaborates with Byzantine's Tekfurs and Mongols against Osman Bey. He even puts Gunduz against Osman by manipulating him and making him the substitute bey when Osman was away. He was beheaded by Osman Bey in front of the Sultan.
- Murat Serezli as Üstad Arius (transl. Master Arius) (disguised as Ibrahim Fakih): Head of a Templar secret organization who seek to destroy Turks and in particular Osman. He was the Master of Aya Nikola and Barkin Bey. Killed by Osman Bey.
- Serdar Özer as Barkin Bey: Husband of Selvi Hatun. After the death of Ömer Bey and his brother Ivaz Bey, he married Selvi and becomes the new bey of Kizilbeyoglu tribe and Çavdar tribe united. He fights Osman's dream of founding a state. He was a loyal disciple of Ustad Arius. Killed by Osman Bey.

==== Season 4 ====
- Hakan Yılmaz as Kantakuzenos: Family member of the House of Kantakouzenos, claims to be the rightful heir to the throne of Emperor Andronikos II. When his attempt to overthrow the emperor failed, he allies himself with Olof, the leader of the imperial bodyguard, and plots numerous times against Osman. Osman Bey beheads him.
- Nihat Altınkaya as Olof: The leader of the Varangian Guard. He initially travelled from the cold north along with his wife Frigg and his men to raid Osman Bey's land and later the Byzantines. Later, converts to Christianity to the displeasure of Frigg. Captures the Inegöl Castle from Osman. He is beheaded by Osman after the reconquest of Inegol in front of Nayman.
- İpek Karapınar as Frigg: A member of the Norsemen fighters and Olof's wife. Deadly and vicious towards her opponents, she starts to spy on Osman and his people, disguised as Martha, a Christian tradeswoman, in Yenişehir. Eventually reveals herself to Osman Bey and Bala Hatun, when the duo were held in captivity by Olof and Kantakouzenos. Later, falls into a trap and is captured and killed by Bala after she tries to attack Orhan and Alaeddin Ali.
- Deniz Barut as Valide İsmihan Sultan: Mother of Sultan Alâeddin. She is very similar to Vizier Alemshah. She is evil by nature and puts hurdles in the way of Osman Bey even collaborating with enemies like Nayman, Olof and Frig. After her son was dethroned she was sent to Tabriz alongside her son.
- Berik Aitzhanov as Komutan Nayman: Senior Ilkhanid commander who leads an army of 40,000 horsemen to raid Anatolia in response to killing of Mongol commander Samagar and an ambassador. He has a charismatic personality, similar to Dirilis Ertugrul's Baycu Noyan. Raids Osman's castles and other Turk principalities wreaking havoc on Osman and his allies. Dislikes Ghazan Khan due to his conversion to Islam and wants to establish his own Tengrist state after getting hold of Genghis Khan's seal. Beheaded by Osman.

==== Season 5 ====
- Yulduz Rajabova as Efendize Elćim Hatun : Daughter of Akbasli Gunduz Bey. First wife of Orhan Bey. Sister-in-law of Alaeddin Ali Bey and Fatma Hatun. Daughter-in-law of Osman Bey and Malhun Hatun. She was a very noble and brave woman who knows fighting very well. Assisted Orhan Bey in many conquests in seasons 5. Came from Hayme Ana's lineage. She was married to Orhan Bey to solidify a political alliance between two branches of the Kayis. At first she was against the marriage but gradually accepted it and developed feelings for Orhan Bey. She got pregnant and Orhan Bey's joy was beyond limits and he decided to name that child Sulyeman after his great-grandfather Sulyeman Shah. She was loved and respected by Osman's family, especially Malhun Hatun whom she treated her like her late-mother. She and her child were shown dead in season 6.
- Emre Dinler as Mehmet Bey: He is the son of Germiyanid ruler, Yakup Bey and Saddet Hatun. Elder brother of Gonca Hatun. He is very boastful and arrogant. He hates Osman Bey and holds a big grudge against Orhan bey and later Alaeddin Bey for loving his sister. He saved Orhan Bey from an ambush led by Imren Tegin. He then changes his behaviour towards Osman, Orhan and Kayi after Osman hands him Uc Pazar again but is still against the marriage of Gonca and Alaeddin.
- Mirza Bahattin Doğan as Yakup Bey. He is the Bey of the Germiyanids. Husband of Saddet Hatun. Father of Mehmet Bey and Gonca Hatun. Owner of Uc Pazar. He falsely proclaimed himself as Sultan after Sultan Mesud's death. Has tense relations with Osman Bey. After he and his plans are revealed to everyone, he returns to Kütahya. After he returns he sides with Ibrahim Bey against Osman Bey and also disowns his daughter Gonca Hatun for marrying Alaeddin.
- Erkan Bektaş as Ibrahim Bey of Candaroğlu. Husband of Melike Hatun and father of Ahmet Bey. He forms an alliance with Yakup Bey against Osman Bey as Gonca Hatun was engaged to his son Ahmet Bey.
- Taner Rumeli as Imren Tegin: A Byzantine Warrior of royal Seljuk descent also called the Executioner of Rome. He comes to the frontiers after Olivia calls him. He wants to start a crusade to destroy the Turks consisting of fighters from the papacy, Catalans, and Franks. After destroying the Turks he hopes to create a new empire under his rule. He raids many of Osman’s tribes, takes the frontier marketplace, and kills all the Tekfurs along with Bayindir Bey. He is also able to easily physically overpower Osman’s men such as Turahan, Konur, and Boran. He is killed by Osman after the Atranos conquest.

==== Season 6 ====
- Ali Sürmeli as Karesi Bey. He is the Bey of Karasid Beylik and a strong opponent of Osman. Works with enemies such as Lucas and Sofia against Osman to weaken him and win the favor of other Beys.
- Özgür Çevik as Lucas. Byzantine commander who arrives as new commander of Bursa. An enemy of Osman who works with Karesi Bey and Sofia. He first sends Holofira with her aid Cecilia who poisons Gonca killing her daughter on Lucas’s orders leading to conflict between Holofira and Gonca and causing much sadness in the tribe. Steals holy Islamic relics to stir conflict between Karesi and Osman to find them. He also causes riots in Yenisehir and Sogut which leads to many casualties. Also tries to ruin Osman by blocking his conquests, trade, and kidnapping his daughter Fatma. Later works with Ulugan to trap Osman and kill him. Killed by Osman in a duel.
- Buçe Buse Kahraman as Begum Hatun. Bey Hatun of a Turk tribe. Secretly in love with Osman for many years and hates Bala. Osman made her Bey Hatun of Karadin Castle against Bala's suggestion. She was made incharge of trade at Sogut when she failed in protecting Karadin. After Fatma, Saruca and Yusuf were kidnapped by Sofia from Sogut, Bala again asked Osman to remove her from her position but Osman did not remove her. Eventually, joins Mongols, and marries Ilbay. When he dies she escapes and runs to Kucar. She later betrays him after being caught by Osman, in return for her freedom. She disappears after.
- Ekin Mert Daymaz as Ilbay. He is believed to be the Grandson of Sungurtekin Bey but turns out to be a prentender. Has a daughter named Ayse and he is not loyal to Osman. Osman beheads him in the Kayi Tribe.
- Ali Önsöz as Yusuf Bey.Younger Brother of Begum Hatun and wants to woo Fatma Hatun in order to marry her. He and Saruca had fights before, but then become good friends, though still bantering about Fatma. He gets martyred by Claudius, as a result of the kayis being outnumbered.
- Erdem Şanli as Saruca Bey. Son of Bayhan Bey and Hazal Hatun. Wants to win his father's favour and marry Fatma Hatun. Got martyred while fighting for Osman Bey.
- Taner Erturkler as Bayhan Bey. Father of Saruca and husband of Hazal Hatun. He is selfish at start but becomes loyal of Osman later. He gets killed by Lucas and Sofia.
- Yildrim Gucuk as Gencer Bey. Bey of Osman who is loyal at first but then allies with Karesi after failing many times and getting embarrassed by Osman. He then spies for Karesi against Osman.
- Feyza Isik as Hazal Hatun. Mother of Saruca and wife of Bayhan, hates Begum Hatun and wants to get her son married to Fatma Hatun. Manipulates Holofira in order to build discord and animosity between her and Gonca. After Bayhan Bey died she disappeared.
- Devrim Saltoğlu as Commander Ulugan . A Mongol commander who comes to make Osman pledge allegiance like the other tribes. He comes as a guest to distract Osman while his men took Karachisar and tortured Orhan and Boran. He commands Ilbay to poison the water in all of Osman’s cities causing Osman to surrender to him. After he found out Osman had a plan that was foiled by Ilbay, he raided Osman’s tribe causing them to seek refuge in the forest and almost executed Osman before he had to be taken to Tabriz. After Osman and his people all escaped, he worked with Sofia and Lucas to capture and kill them trapping Osman many times. He is finally killed after Osman takes back his tribe.
- Cengiz Coşkun as Turgut Alp is the son of Konur Alp (Süleyman Şah's Alps), adoptive brother of Ertuğrul Bey and the blood brother of Bamsı Beyrek and Doğan Alp. He is one of the three main alps of Ertuğrul, along with his blood brothers. Turgut is Ertuğrul's best friend and the adoptive son of Süleyman Şah and Hayme Hatun. He is also the widower of Aykız Hatun and Aslıhan Hatun. He returned from far away lands along with his tribe to serve Osman Bey in his upcoming missions. Based on Turgut Alp
- Asya Ağca as Halime Hatun (brainwashed by Sofia as Poena) . Fourth child of Osman Bey by Bala Hatun, Step daughter of Malhun Hatun. She is the younger sister of Alaeddin Bey, and younger half-sister of Orhan Bey and Fatma Hatun. Foster Niece of Sofia under the name Poena, tries to kill her Parents via Sofia's manipulation and brainwashing. Named after her paternal grandmother Halime Sultan by Osman Bey. She was announced dead leaving Osman and Bala devastated for years, Sofia reveals that she raised her daughter as hers to torture Bala Hatun after her husband killed Sofia's baby during the Kulucahisar conquest. She tries to commit suicide by jumping off the hill due to the guilt of trying to kill her parents, she falls in the river and is saved and brought to the tribe by Osman Bey and Bala Hatun. She struggles to call them parents, but later accepts them as parents after saving Alaeddin from the Mongols. She converts to Islam right after.
- Claudius: A Christian commander, who has come from Constantinople to help Sofia. He was in love with Sofia. Ends up betraying her and takes over Bursa when she allies with Osman on the Emperor's orders. He was Kucar's ally but sold him out to Osman for a cart of gold. Is late beheaded by Osman in front of the Kayi Tribe.

== Supporting Characters ==
=== Gündüz Bey ===
Gündüz Bey (Emre Basalak; starring in seasons 1–3) was the first and eldest son of Ertuğrul Gazi and Halime Sultan. Nephew of Selcan Hatun, whom he treated as his own mother. Savcı Bey and Osman Bey's eldest brother. Husband of Ayşe Hatun, and the father Aktemur Bey and Aydoğdu Bey, father-in-law of Alcicek Hatun. Uncle to Bayhoca Bey, Ertugrul jr, Orhan Bey, Alaeddin Bey, Fatma Hatun, and Halime Hatun. He was protective and loving toward Osman Bey and Savcı Bey. In Season 2, he supports Osman in becoming the next bey of the tribe and is always ready to help him and support him. In Season 3, he becomes the substitute Kayi Bey when Osman was away on Vizier Alemshah's orders. He also turned against Osman because of Vizier Alemshah manipulating him. Like when he and his wife betrayed the Kayi tribe by taking Mari out of the Kayi tribe and making his wife put opium (given by Vizier Alemshah) in her sherbet so she can pass out. After that, Gündüz Bey took her out of the Kayi tribe and delivered her to Vizier Alemshah so she can be given to Kosses and Nikola. He was martyred in the battle of victory of Inegol Castle. Based on Gündüz Alp, the son of Ertuğrul.

Savcı Bey

Savcı Bey (Kanbolat Görkem Arslan; starring in season 2) was the second son of Ertuğrul Gazi and Halime Sultan. Nephew of Selcan Hatun. Gündüz Bey's younger brother and Osman Bey's elder brother. Husband of Lena Hatun, and the father of Bayhoca Bey and Ertugrul jr. Uncle to Aktemur Bey, Aydoğdu Bey, Orhan Bey, Alaeddin Bey, Fatma Hatun, and Halime Hatun. At the start of season 2, he had tense relations with Osman because he wanted to become the next Kayi Bey. However, Dundar Bey tricked him and instead bought the Beys with gold in order for him to become the Bey. Later on when Osman become the bey he supported him and helped him in battles. He was martyred by Kalanos during the ambush of Nikola. Based on the historical Saru Batu Savcı Bey the son of Ertuğrul.

=== Aktemur Bey ===
Aktemur bey (Taha Baran Özbek; starring in seasons 3–TBD) is the son of Gunduz Bey (deceased) and Ayse Hatun. Was assigned a secret mission by Osman Bey for many years until he returns to the Kayi Tribe. His first appearance was when he was spying for Osman Bey in Bilecik, then Inegol. After Inegol is conquered, he returns to the Kayi tribe. He becomes the Subaši of Yenišehir after it is conquered. He falls in love with Alçiçek, the daughter of Oktem Bey and Bengi Hatun. After marrying Alçiçek, he becomes the Bey of Oktem's tribe and Marmaracik. He and his immediate family do not appear in Season 5.

=== Ayse Hatun ===
Ayşe Hatun (Açelya Özcan; starring in seasons 1–4) is Gündüz Bey's wife and Osman Bey's sister-in-law. Mother of Aktemur Bey and Aydoğdu Bey. The mother-in-law of Alçiçek Hatun. She is a very noble and pious women. Knows how to calm her husband and is very attached to Selcan Hatun and treats her like her own mother. She is loyal to Osman and her tribe and also has very good relations with Malhun, Bala and Aygül Hatun. When her husband was manipulated by Vizier Alemshah, she was sad to betray the Kayi tribe by helping him in taking Mari out of the Kayi tribe by putting opium in her sherbet so she can pass out. After that, Gunduz Bey took her out of the Kayi tribe and delivered her to Vizier Alemshah so she can be given to Kosses and Nikola. Is devastated at her husband's martyrdom whilst being pregnant. Had tense relations with Bengi and Alçiçek temporarily. She and her sons don't appear in season 5.

=== Aygül Hatun ===
Aygül (Buse Arslan; starring in seasons 1–3) was the daughter of Dündar Bey and Zöhre Hatun and step-daughter of Hazal Hatun, the younger sister of Batur Bey and younger half-sister of Bahadır Bey. First wife of Cerkutay Bey. She was a paternal cousin of Osman Bey and niece of Selcan Hatun and Ertugrul Bey. She was the widow of Alişar Bey and the mother of Kayı Alp. She used to be in love with Osman Bey, until Osman Bey supposedly kills her brother, Batur Alp. When she learned the truth, she became mentally unstable and attempted to kill Hazal Hatun (after Hazal killed Zohre Hatun) twice even mistakenly killing her best friend Burcin Hatun. Later Selcan Hatun took care of her far away from tribe and trained her well to became a great warrior female Alp of Osman. She is very good friends with Bala and Gonca, and later with Malhun as well. Cerkutay falls head over heels in love with her and Selcan Hatun persuades her to marry him. Along with Kayi, she also has unknown kids with Cerkutay (Mentioned in Episode 98). She was martyred in the battle of victory of Yenişehir.

Aliases:

- Deli Aygül (transl. "Crazy Aygül"; nickname given by Cerkutay)

=== Sheikh Edebali ===
Şeyh Edebali (Seda Yıldız; starring in seasons 1–4) is a Sufi Sheikh, Osman Bey's mentor and father-in-law. He is the son of Mahmut Derviş and widower of Ulduz Hatun. He is father of Bala Hatun and maternal grandfather of Alaeddin Ali and Halime Hatun and treats Orhan and Fatma as his own grandchildren. A mentor to Osman. He is also both the father-in-law and teacher of Dursun Fakih. Based on Sheikh Edebali.

=== Selcan Hatun ===
Selcan Hatun (Didem Balçın; starring in seasons 1–3) was the eldest daughter of Alptekin Bey and the adoptive daughter of Süleyman Şah and Hayme Hatun. She was the older sister of Gökçe Hatun and the adoptive sister of Sungurtekin Gazi, Ertuğrul Gazi and Dündar Bey. She was the widow of Gündoğdu Bey and the bereaved mother of Süleyman Alp and İltekin Bey. Selcan was treated as a mother by Gündüz, Savci and Osman after Halime Hatun's death and later by Bala, Aygül, Gonca, Malhun and Ayse after their mothers' deaths. She was protective of all the Kayı Hatuns, her nephews and nieces and was loyal to her adoptive brother, Ertuğrul Gazi. She died in Season 3 due to growing age and illness leaving the tribe teary-eyed. Loosely based on Princess Saljan, a character from the Book of Dede Korkut.

Aliases:

- Selcan Ana (transl. Mother Selcan)

=== Bayindir Bey ===
(Deniz Hamzaoglu as Bayindir Bey seasons 4–5). The bey of Çavuldur tribe. He is a charismatic and opportunistic character. He goes where the money flows, which makes him an unpredictable character, when he sides with someone. Later repented and sided with Osman Bey in his conquests.Got martyred by Imren Tegin and Olivia.

=== Gonca Hatun ===
Gonca Hatun (Emel Dede; starring in seasons 1–3) was the wife of Boran Alp, and the adoptive sister and best friend of Bala. A lady of the Ahis, serves and is loyal to her father figure, Şeyh Edebali. She treats Selcan Hatun as a mother, and is saddened when she temporarily has to leave the tribe. She was talented at fighting, along with her companions Bala and Aygül. She was martyred by Julia while protecting the important Christian relic that Osman had kept in the in the Kayi tribe and whilst saving Bala Hatun and Orhan as well.

=== Kumral Abdal ===
Kumral Abdal (Emin Gürsoy; starring in seasons 2–4) is a follower of Şeyh Edebali and flag bearer of Ertuğrul Gazi. He devotes himself to spreading Islam and fighting infidels. He is also a very good healer. He becomes a mentor to Cerkutay after Bamsi's death. He helped to rescue the children from the Kayi tribe that were sent to the Christian Monastery by Julia by acting like a Priest. He is good friends with Osman's kids and often tells them many stories. Does not appear in Season 5. Based on Kumral Abdal, one of Sheikh Edebali's dervishes.

=== Ulgen Hatun ===
Ulgen Hatun (Begum Cagla Taskin) is Cerkutay's second-wife and Gazi's mother. Daughter of Kara Ebe Farishta Hatun. She is a chef who is well known for her cooking. Has a really good and teasing personality. She is very good friends with Malhun, Bala and Ayşe Hatun. She also has good relations with Orhan, Alaeddin and Fatma and is always ready to help them. She is loyal to Osman Bey and the Kayı. She died by poision in food.

=== Bamsı Beyrek ===
Bamsı (Nurettin Sönmez; starring in seasons 1–2) was the adoptive brother and loyal Alp of Ertuğrul Ghazi. He was the former Chief Alp of the Kayı tribe and the widower of Hafsa Hatun, father of Aslıhan (daughter of Bamsı) and Aybars Bey and adoptive father of Sıddık Alp. He was loving towards his wife and children and used to count the days since his daughter and wife died in a plague and then mourned for weeks after his son dies, mourning just as much for his adoptive son. He was a close friend and mentor of Osman Bey and also later becomes a father-like figure for Cerkutay. He was martyred in the ambush led by Togay. Loosely based on Bamsi Beyrek, a character in the Book of Dede Korkut, whose story was referenced by Bamsı in Season 3 of Diriliş: Ertuğrul.

=== Abdurrahman Gazi ===
Abdurrahman Gazi (Celal Al; starring in seasons 1–2) was a veteran warrior of the Kayı tribe. A former bodyguard of Osman Bey's grandparents, Süleyman Şah and Hayme Hatun, and an Alp of Ertuğrul Gazi. A close friend of Osman Bey. A former chief Alp of the Kayı tribe. One of his arms was amputated after he was wounded by Sofia. He is loyal to both Osman Bey and his father. Skilled in battle, and respected by everyone. He supports Osman in becoming the Bey. He is later martyred in Togay's ambush. Based on Abdurrahman Gazi.

=== Gurbuz Alp ===
Alpaslan Ozmol as Gurbuz Alp: (season 4–5) An Alp of Osman who spied for him in Kopruhisar and is trolled for his shortness. Loves food and adds colour to the series when he fights for food with Cerkutay. Cerkutay doesn't like him being respected by Ulgen Hatun as a joke. Got martyred in season 5.

=== Single-season characters ===
This is a list of characters who were supporting characters in a single season, and may have made guest or minor appearances in other seasons:

=== Season 1 ===
- Saruhan Hünel as Alişar Bey: The first husband of Aygül Hatun and the posthumous father of Kayı Alp. Alişar is the Selçuk Sançak Bey, an operative figure who deputies the Sultan and is the ruler/governor of the western portion of the Selçuk Sultanate of Rum. He is a puppet of the Mongols like most Selçuk operatives and leadership. Alişar was initially in love with Bala Hatun and Princess Sofia. Later beheaded by Osman at the Kayi tribe. Based on Karim al-Din Alishir.
- Yurdaer Okur as Komutan Balgay (transl. Commander Balgay): A Mongol commander who attacks the Kayı tribe. He envisions becoming the leader of the Mongols. He dislikes Geyhatu for his conversion to Buddhism. He was killed by Osman when Balgay ambushed him. Based on Balgay.
- Eren Hacısalihoğlu as Batur Alp: The son of Dündar Bey and Zöhre Hatun, step-son of Hazal Hatun. He is the elder half-brother of Bahadır Bey, and elder brother of Aygül Hatun. Osman Bey's cousin. Killed by Alisar Bey to blame Osman for that. Not to be confused with Diriliş: Ertuğrul's Batur Alp.
- İsmail Hakkı Ürün as Samsa Çavuş (also known as Samsa Bey): A ruthless veteran soldier who runs part of the Kayı tribe. A close friend of Osman. He loves to battle and gets angry at those who do not stand with him. Not to be confused with Diriliş: Ertuğrul's Samsa Alp, although they are both based on the same historical figure, Samsa Çavuş.
- Ayşegül Günay Demir as Zöhre Hatun (referred to as Zöhre Ana by Burçin Hatun): Dündar Bey's second wife. She is the mother of Batur Bey and Aygül Hatun, step-mother of Bahadır Bey, and adoptive mother of Burçin Hatun. She is ambitious and abominates Osman Bey for overshadowing her family and seeks revenge on him. When attempting to poison every body at the evening of Osman's and Bala's wedding event by poisoning the meat, Hazal Hatun had already known about that and slit her throat in front of everyone.
- Çağkan Çulha as Bahadır Bey: The son of Dündar Bey and Hazal Hatun, step-son of Zöhre Hatun. The older half-brother of Aygül Hatun and the younger half-brother of Batur Bey. Cousin of Osman Bey. Not to be confused with Diriliş: Ertuğrul's Bahadır Bey.
- Latif Koru as Salvador/ Sıddık Alp (formerly Prens Salvador, transl. Prince Salvador): Was a Catalonian Prince and a member of the Catalan Company. Later converted to Islam when captured by Osman. He later becomes a son to Bamsi although he has killed his son Aybars previously. He served as a spy for Osman at Kulucahisar castle but later got caught, fatally poisoned and martyred by Princess Sofia. He is Yannis's former servant.
- Aslıhan Karalar as Burçin Hatun: Fiancé of Aybars. Zöhre Hatun's adoptive daughter. Best friend of Aygül. She disliked Osman and blames him for Aybars' death. At the end of Season 1 she was accidentally shot by an arrow by Aygul Hatun, saving Hazal Hatun.

=== Season 2 ===
- Yeşim Ceren Bozoğlu as Hazal Hatun (Note: guest in Season 1): Dündar's first wife and Bahadır's mother, stepmother of Batur Bey and Aygül Hatun, Hanım of the Çobanoğulları tribe, granddaughter of Hüsamettin Çoban and sister of Muzaffereddin Yavlak Arslan. She wears luxurious purple clothes and expensive jewelry. Hazal is arrogant as she is the sister of an influential and wealthy bey. She supports Dündar in his treacherous plans. After Dundar was caught red handed, she was exiled to her maiden tribe.

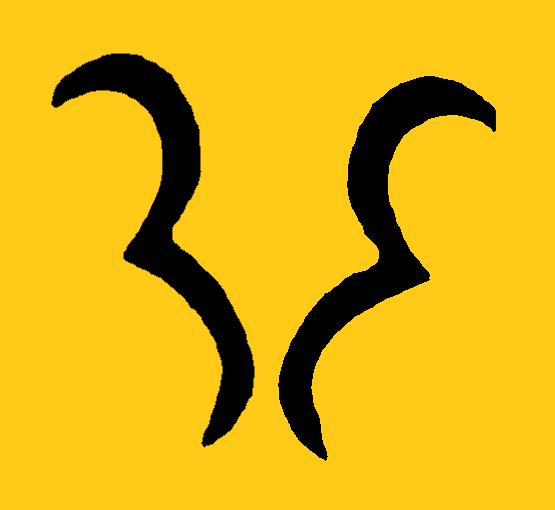
Flag of the Çobanoğlu tribe

- Umut Karadağ as Yavlak Arslan (also known as Muzaffereddin Yavlak Hasan and Arslan Bey): Hazal Hatun's older brother, Dündar's brother-in-law, and Bahadır Bey's uncle. Bey of the Çobanoğulları, a small, poor but powerful tribe close to the Mongols during Argun's rule. Formerly a rebellious protégé of Ertuğrul. He is the Uç Bey of Kastamonu. Based on Muzaffer al-Din Yavlak Arslan, the third bey of the Chobanids, an Anatolian beylik.
- Seray Kaya as Lena Hatun (formerly Prensesi Lena, transl. Princess Lena): Savcı Bey's wife and the daughter of a Byzantine Tekfur in Karacahisar. She is the mother of Bayhoca and another son named Ertuğrul. After Bayhoca became a martyr, she decided to convert to Islam. She was devastated at the martyrdom of her husband and decided to move back to Karacahisar along with her son. Loosely based on Avna Hatun, the wife of Saru Batu Savcı Bey.
- Yağızkan Dikmen as Bayhoca: The first son of Savcı Bey and Lena Hatun. Osman Bey's nephew. Spent years studying in Crimea. Admires his uncle, Osman, and aspires to be like him, having a thirst for battle. However, due to his young age, he is naive and makes bad decisions, sometimes endangering himself and others. He was martyred in a battle against Inegöl's Tekfur Nikola by Flatyos while trying to capture him on his way to Constantinople due to Dündar's treachery. Based on Bayhoca.
- Zeynep Tuğçe Bayat as Targun Hatun: The daughter of İnal Bey who was sent to the Kayı tribe by Aya Nikola to spy, in exchange for Nikola releasing her father from captivity. She is from a distant Cuman Turk tribe, which just like the Oǧuz Turks is of Turkic ethnicity, however, is Tengrist rather than Muslim. After Osman refused to marry her (because she became Muslim only to marry him and poisoned Bala) she turned into an enemy of him but later got killed by Bala with the help of Göktug while she was captured.
- Seçkin Özdemir as Komutan Flatyos (transl. Commander Flatyos): A disgraced Byzantine commander and an old friend of Aya Nikola, much like Diriliş: Ertuğrul's Uranos and Titan. He has a grudge against Ertuğrul and his sons, as Ertuğrul killed his father, presumably Komutan Kostas, when he was conquering Karacahisar. Has an unrequited love for Lena. He also holds a grudge against Savcı for marrying her. After being held in the caged tent at the Kayi tribe, Savcı and Lena avenged their son Bayhoca and killed him much to Osman's anger.
- Şahin Ergüney as Ömer/Umur Bey: The Bey of the Bayındır tribe. Son of Kızıl Bey and father of Malhun Hatun. A war veteran formerly loyal to the Seljuks, famed for battles against the Mongols. Initially had tense relations with Osman Bey, but after he married his daughter, he supported him in battles. He was the maternal grandfather of Orhan and Fatma Hatun. Based on Ömer Bey, the father of Malhun Hatun.
- Mert Turak as Petrus (disguised as Süleyman): A member of the Knights Templar organisation. Sent by the Pope for a secret plan. After being held in the caged tent at the Kayi tribe, on Osman Bey's orders, he was killed by Bamsi Bey. Not to be confused with Diriliş: Ertuğrul's Petrus.
- Teoman Kumbaracıbaşı as Kara Şaman Togay (transl. Dark Shaman Togay): The son of Baycu Noyan, raised by a Shaman after Noyan's death. Has two unknown brothers who serve him. A fierce commander and 'hunting dog' of Geyhatu. Makes agreements with Osman but often breaks them. Betrays Geyhatu and is captured by Governor Yargucu along with Camuha. Later Turhan Alp tricked both of them into getting captured by Osman. Eventually gets beheaded by Osman in Soğut.
- Şevket Süha Tezel as Epharistos Kalanoz: The younger brother of Komutan Kalanoz. Sent by the Emperor to assist Nikola. After he and Nikola ambushed Osman he killed Savcı to avenge his brother because Osman killed him. Then Osman killed him to avenge Savcı. Based on Kalanoz, a commander of Tekfur Aya Nikola.
- Emre Koc as Komutam Camuha: A Mongol commander sent by Geyhatu to help Kara Shaman Togay collect taxes from tribes. Initially spies for Geyhatu but betrays along with Togay and eventually gets beheaded by Osman in Soğut.
- Murat Boncuk as Aykut Alp: An Alp of Osman Bey
- Yusuf Korkmaz as Salguraga Alp: A loyal Alp of Osman who appeared at the end of Season 2 and helps him at the hardest times. He is known as a lone bear of Konya.

=== Season 3 ===
- Yildiray Şahinler as Tekfur Rogatus Laskaris: Tekfur of Bilecik Castle and a member of Laskaris family and is the nephew of the Emperor Andronicus II. He owns the principality and lands of Bilecik (Bilecik and Harmankaya principalities are only for royal family members). He is the best friend of Tekfur Kosses.
- Serdar Akülker as Anselmo: Leader of a group of Catalans who served only for money; killed by Osman.
- Şeyma Korkmaz as Prenses Mari: She was the sister of Kosses and she married Turgut Bey. Initially the love interest of Tekfur Aya Nikola. She fell in love with Turgut Bey after he abducting her. Later, she was kidnapped from the Kayi tribe before their wedding and taken to Inegol Castle. When Nikola attempts to kill her by stabbing her, Turgut Bey saved her and takes her back to his tribe. With her brother, Kosses's blessings, Mari married Turgut in Harmankaya. She was fatally poisoned by Cornelia while pregnant, devastating Turgut Bey.
- Melis Gürhan as Cornelia: The assistant of Mari. Secret puppet of Ustad Arius.
- Serdar Kayaokay as Papaz Gregor: A Byzantine priest who carries an important Christian relic. Friend of Tekfur Rogatus. Beheaded by Osman when he tried to explode Sogut.
- Yazmeen Baker as Julia: An evil Christian warrior woman who was brought by Tekfur Rogatus in Anatolia with her personnel named "The Angels of Death" to serve him. Infiltrated the Kayi Tribe and killed the Alps by a special poison that she made. She also used that poison to kill Gonca Hatun in order to get the important Christian relic that Osman had kept in the tribe. Later she kidnapped the children of Kayi Tribe on Tekfur Rogatus's orders and sent them to the Christian Monastery to become loyal soldiers of Jesus. Captured by Malhun Hatun and later killed by Boran Alp as a revenge of Gonca Hatun's death.
- Sibel Aytan as Zehra Hatun: A close friend and companion of Bala Hatun who appears shortly after Gonca Hatun's death.
- Batuhan Bozkurt Yüzgüleç as Akça Koca/ Çoban (transl. shepherd): A simple shepherd near Inegöl. When Osman suddenly appears, he joines him. Orphaned, he grew up under the care of an Armenian carpenter. He has cartographic skills and a great ingenuity about weaponry. Later he becomes a journeyman with the Ahi brotherhood of Sheikh Edebali. Loosely based on Akça Koca
- Sacit Süer as Ferman: A soldier who is one of Alemshah's closest men.
- Zehra Yılmaz as Selvi Hatun: Barkin's wife, Ivaz Bey's daughter and paternal cousin of Malhun, who holds deep hatred for her. Later repented and was martyred in a Mongol attack, devastating Malhun Hatun.
- Serkan Tastemur as Hüsameddin Alp: An Alp of Barkin Bey.
- Barış Yalçınsoy as Isaac Alp or Komutan Isaac: An apprentice of Master Arius and his favorite student who poses to Akca dervish. Returns in 116 (Season 4) as a shaman of Komutan Nayman and as a converted spy of Turgut Bey
- Şükrü Türen as Ali Bey
- Engincan Tura as Mustafa Bey: A young son of Ali Bey and an apprentice of Atabey Ahmet
- Ozan Ayhan as Komutan Romanos: A deadly commander from Constantinople who intends to destroy Osman
- Levent Özdilek as Tekfur Basileus: Tekfur of Yarhisar Castle; step-father of Holofira.
- Duru Yazıcı as Holofira: Step-daughter of Tekfur Basileus. Based on Holofira
- Cemil Büyükdöğerli as Komutan Cebe: A fierce Mongol commander who allied with Romanos and Barkin to defeat Osman and create havoc between him and Ali Bey.

=== Season 4 ===
- Kaan Yalçin as Öktem Bey: the Kargin's tribe former Bey. Alçiçek's father and Bengi's husband and aveteran commander. He has a strong character and loves his family. Nayman beheads, and thus martyrs him, in front of his family.
- Burç Kümbetlioğlu as Dursun Fakih is both the son-in-law and student of Sheikh Edebali. He is the brother-in-law of Bala Hatun. He leads the Friday sermon and prayer on behalf of Osman Bey when Osman announces his Beylik. He made a guest appearance in Season 3.
- Miray Akay as Alçicek Hatun: The daughter of Oktem Bey and Bengi Hatun. Wants to join the Baciyans. The Baş Hatun of the Kargin tribe, and the wife of Aktemur Bey. Currently pregnant with a child to Aktemur.
- Almila Uluer Atabeyoğlu as Bengi Hatun: Öktem Bey's wife and Alçiçek's mother. She is rude, combative, and possessive. Dislikes Kayis especially Aktemur and Ayşe. Has become positive and supportive of Osman Bey after her husband's martyrdom. But was exiled for two years for her previous mistakes.
- Halime Hatun; (starring in Season 4-6 played by Asya Ağca in season 6) was the fourth child of Osman Bey. Daughter of Osman Bey and his first wife Bala Hatun. Step-daughter of Malhun Hatun. She was the younger sister of Orhan, Alaeddin Ali and Fatma Hatun. She was named in honour of her paternal grandmother, Halime Sultan. In Season 5, she is shown dead, devastating her family, especially her mother, Bala Hatun. Later known to have been brainwashed by Sofia under the name Poena, she learns from the head sister of the church that she is the daughter of Osman and Bala. She tries to commit suicide after the guilt of trying to kill her own parents due to Sofia's manipulation. She is then saved by Osman and Bala, and brought in to the tribe, leading to tensions with Fatma Hatun. She eventually accepts that she belongs in the Kayi Tribe and recognizes Osman and Bala to be her parents on their way to save her elder brother Alaeddin from the Mongols.
- Muhammad Mertoglu as Görkluce Alp: An Alp of Malhun and Orhan. Is mostly present in Yeniseher.
- Sena Cakir as Esrigun Hatun: The foster daughter of Ghazan Han, skilled in fighting, saves Osman Bey from getting beheaded by Ismihan and Nayman in Konya. Came to arrest Nayman on the orders of Ghazan Han. She also falls in love with Boran Alp.

=== Season 5 ===
- Ismail Erkan as Kanyumaz Bey : Assistant of Yakup Bey who changed sides after being caught to Karesi Bey, but after Karesi is exposed, then he becomes a server of Osman Gazi
- Sevıl Akı as Saadet Hatun: Wife of Yakup Bey, mother of Mehmet Bey and Gonca Hatun. She is arrogant and holds grudge against Malhun Hatun and later Bala Hatun. She is very evil and can do anything for power. She uses her own daughter for spying on Alaeddin despite knowing she loves him and would not break his trust. She does not pity Gonca which strains their relationship. After the dirty misdeeds of her and Yakup Bey are caught, she returns to Kütahya.
- Gökhan Atalay as Yunus Emre: He is a Turk dervish. He always guides other with his wisdom whenever they are astray or need help. He is very wise and calm. He is respected by Osman, his wives, sons and Alps and also Yakup's family.
- Yagmur Ozturk as Ayca Hatun: Sister-in-law of Elcim hatun, widow of her brother and daughter in law of Akbasli Gunduz Bey. She was first introduced as Elcim Hatun to hide real Elcim's identity from Taceddin Noyan. She was a strong warrior and a brave Hatun who was willing to do anything to save her family from oppressors. She gets poisoned by Olivia which results in her becoming negative, evil and boastful. She gets killed by Olivia.
- Ebru Kocaaga as Prenses Tekfur Olivia: She is the Tekfur of Atranos. She was Holofira's maternal aunt. She has a strong dislike towards Osman, the Kayi and the Turks. At the beginning, she was shown as very protective towards Holofira but later used her in conspiracies for Byzantine's cause. She poisons and killed Ayca Hatun. She gets killed by Elcim Hatun to avenge Ayca Hatun.
- İbrahim Temizoğlu as Karacelasun: A Mongol commander loyal to Gorklu Han. He first appears in order to avenge his brother who got killed by Osman and holds a grudge against him. He raids Uc Bazar which results in many casualties. He attacks and raids Osman, his alps and sons whenever he gets a chance. He also teams up with Vasilis and Usta Gera for his mission. He is subsequently caught by Osman and is later killed by Taceddin Noyan.
- Ridvan Aybars Duzey as Vasilis: He is a Byzantine commander. A disciple of Usta Gera. He spies in Osman's palace by acting as an Alp. He helps Karacelsun and Usta Gera in their schemes. He is later killed by Osman Bey.
- Bengi Öztürk Akkaya as Melike Hatun . She is the wife of Ibrahim Bey of Candaroğlu. Mother of Ahmet Bey. She is boastful towards Kayis as she thinks that Alaeddin Ali killed her son Ahmet Bey.
- Alican Ocumuş as Suleyman Bey : He is the son of Candar Bey. After the death of his father, he becomes the new Bey of the Candaroğulları tribe. He supports Osman Bey and is ready to fight with him. He dislikes Yakup Bey and his evil schemes but is forced to form an alliance with him.

Ümit Kantarcılar as Commander Ulcay: The Leader of the Cavdar Tatars and a Powerful Ilkhanid Commander. Sent by Ilkhan Öljaitü Khan to kill Ahmed Bey the son of Ibrahim Bey of the Candarids to start a huge war so that Emir Irinjin Noyan's army will destroy the Candarid, Germiyanid and Kayi Beyliks. Is killed by Osman after he was found out to be Öljaitü Khan's commander.

== Minor characters ==
Recurring cast

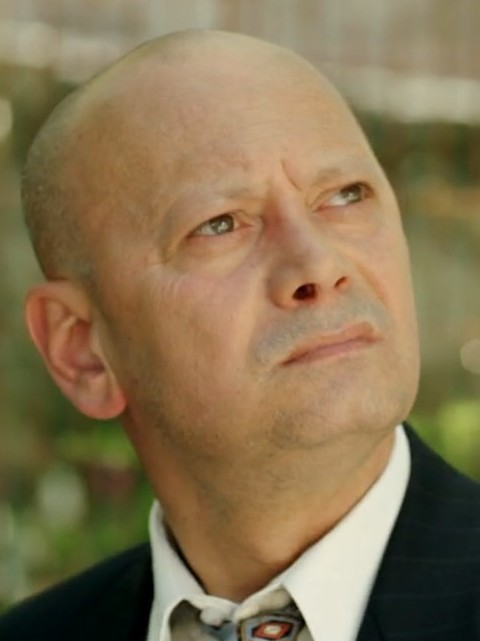
Bahtiyar Engin (David / Çömleçki İdris)

=== Osman's Alps ===
- Fatih Ayhan as Baysungur Alp (Seasons 2–6): The bodyguard of Ertuğrul Bey and Savcı Bey. Supports Savcı in his attempt to become the Bey. Later sides with Osman Bey after Savci's death. He is good friends with Osman's sons, Orhan and Alaeddin and is always there ready to protect and fight for his Bey and his family. Based on Baysungur Alp, the Alp of Ertuğrul and Osman.
- Turpal Tokaev as Turahan Alp(Seasons 3-TBD): An Alp from Karabakh who came in search of Osman. Helped Osman during difficult times. He is great friends with Cerkutay and Baysungur. He is physically very strong and specializes in fighting with an axe.
- Ömer Ağan as Saltuk Alp(Seasons 1–3): Adoptive son of Dündar Bey and Hazal Hatun, bodyguard and Alp of Dündar. Later sided with Osman Bey. He was martyred in Season 3 by Ustad Arius. Based on Saltuk Alp, an early Ottoman warrior.
- Jaffa Dz as Shamil Alp (Season 3-TBD): A young Alp who arrived with Gence bey to assist and support Osman towards his goal for a future state. His loyalty and bravery makes him one of Osman's most trusted Alps.
- Murat Boncuk as Aykurt Alp (Season 2-TBD): Osman's trusted alp who appears in season 3. He is great friends with Cerkutay, Gurbuz and Shamil Alps.
- Alpaslan Ozmol as Gurbuz Alp(Season 4–5): An Alp of Osman who is dwarf. He spied for him in Kopruhisar and is trolled for his shortness. Loves food and adds colour to the series when he fights for food with Cerkutay. Cerkutay doesn't like him being respected by Ulgen Hatun and her mother as a joke. He got martyred in season 5 by Karacelasun.
- Zabit Samedov as Gence Bey(Season 2-TBD): An Azerbaijani Turk warrior from Karabakh. Does not appear after season 3.
- Osman Abatu as Hamza Alp (Season 6):Hamza Alp, portrayed by Osman Abatu, is one of Osman Bey's loyal and courageous warriors. As a trusted Alp, he stands by Osman Bey through battles and hardships, known for his strength, bravery, and unwavering loyalty to the Kayı tribe.
- Atilla Güzel as Ayaz Alp(Season 1–2): Osman Bey's Alp. Works usually with Dumrul Alp. He is the oldest of Osman's Alps and loves to eat. Uses an axe in one hand and a sword in the other. He is martyred by Flatyos.
- Tolga Akkaya as Dumrul Alp(Season 1–2): Osman Bey's Alp. Works usually with Ayaz Alp. He is martyred in Flatyos' ambush. Not to be confused with Diriliş: Ertuğrul's Dumrul Alp.
- Kemal Arda As Cinar Alp(Season 2–5): A provoked Alp of Bamsi who makes entry quiet a times with bamsi Bey in Season 2. He reappears in 117 in fight against Nayman.
- Ismail Alan as Yagiz Alp (Season 2-TBD): An Alp of Osman from Season 2. Appears more often with Dumrel, Oguz and Ayaz
- Hakan Oncu As Dumrel Alp (Season 2–5): An Alp of Osman from Season 2.
- Samet Aksoy As "Oguz Alp" ( Season 1 to TBD): An Alp of osman from season 1 who was part of the old Osman Team .

=== Multiple Seasons ===
- Ayşen Gürler as Helen (Season 1–2): She is the closest assistant of Sofia and her best friend. She is dedicated and loyal to Sofia's and her father's cause. She holds a strong grudge against the Kayı, especially Osman and Bala. After the conquest of Kulacahisar and Sofia's death, she serves Nikola in İnegöl and helps him in re-capturing Kulacahisar. She is good friends with both Nikola and Flatyos. Does not appear after Season 2.
- Ahmet Kılıç as Zülfikar Derviş (Season 1–2): A dervish of Şeyh Edebali who works for Osman and Bala. He is killed by Nikola when he was spying for Osman in İnegöl.
- Abidin Yerebakan as Akça Derviş (Season 1–3): A close friend of Şeyh Edebali, and one of his dervishes. Not to be confused with Diriliş: Ertuğrul's Akça Bey. He doesn't appear after Season 3.
- Ahmet Yenilmez as Demirci Davud (transl. Blacksmith Davud, also known as Davut Bey) (Season 2–3): A close companion of Osman and Ertuğrul and the Kayı blacksmith, He is mostly seen around with Çömlekçi İdris. He is brave and loyal to Osman Bey. He is martyred in the conquest of Yenişehir.
- Rasid Baran as Raşit Alp(Season 2–3): A devoted Alp of Umur Bey from Kizil Bey tribe who is also an Alp of Malhun Hatun. Does not appear after the time skip in Season 3.
- Burak Yenilmez as Kutan Alp(Season 3–4): Personal Alp of Turgut Bey and his best friend. He was martyred by Nayman along with Acar Alp in front of Turgut Bey.
- Sener Savas as Sultan Mesud II(Season 2–5): Ruler of the Sultanate of Rum. He was dethroned by Ismihan Sultan and her son Alaeddin but later with the help of Osman becomes the Sultan again. He is always ready to help Osman, supporting him and is by his side. In season 5, he is shown to have been poisoned and grown sick and later dies. He is falsely succeeded by Yakup Bey with the help of Yakup's daughter Gonca Hatun.
- Ümit Belen as Imparator Andronikos II(Season 2–4): Emperor of Byzantine Empire. He has tough relations with Osman, the Kayı and the Turks and also has a strong hatred & dislike towards them. He sends many commanders and soldiers to defeat Osman but is often left disappointed.

=== Season 1 ===
- Abdül Süsler as Komutan Kalanoz (transl. Commander Kalanoz): He is commander of Kulucahisar and Sofia's lover. He thought that he had to kill Yorgopolos in order to marry Sofia, he didn't know that it was a plan of the Margarit Monks. Later sided with Sofia. Not to be confused with his younger brother Epharistos Kalanoz.
- Kadir Terzi as Kanturali Alp: An Alp of Osman Bey. He is martyred during Osman's escape from Salvador. Not to be confused with Diriliş: Ertuğrul's Turalı Alp. Loosely based on Kan Turali, a character from the Book of Dede Korkut.

=== Season 2 ===
- Bahtiyar Engin as David (disguised as Çömlekçi İdris, transl. Potter İdris): A Templar spy working for the devious Efendi Petrus for years. Disguised as a cowardly Kayı potter who decided to migrate to Arslan's tribe when his tribe was in a bad situation. He replaces Şahin Bey as tribe council bey and is seen around with Demirci Davud. When he was caught red-handed by Osman he was shot by an arrow by Dündar Bey.
- Sezanur Sözer as Eftalya: Daughter of Arito Üsta. The maid of Aya Nikola.
- Kahraman Sivri as Arito Üsta: The father of Eftalya. He is deaf, but an expert lip-reader. As Nikola's cook, he spies for the Kayıs along with his daughter, helping them in their attacks on Nikola's forces. When he was caught, he was killed along with his daughter by Nikola and Helen.
- Oğuz Kara as Ahmet Alp: A boy who lost his father to Tefkur Alexis, much like Dirilis: Ertugrul's Turali. Bala and Osman treat him as their own son. Not to be confused with Diriliş: Ertuğrul's Ahmet Alp (formerly Ares). Based on Ahmet Gazi, one of Orhan Gazi's Alps.
- Çağlar Yalçınkaya as Sartaç Alp: The Alp and bodyguard of Yavlak Arslan.
- Cüneyt Arkın as the head of the White-Bearded Men - This leader is said to be the most developed Aksakal head out of both Kuruluş: Osman and Diriliş: Ertuğrul. He is a close companion of Ertuğrul and later Osman.
- Tekin Temel as Simon (disguised as Melik): The right-hand man of Petrus, posing as a wealthy merchant, "Tüccar Melik Abdullah". Killed by Nikola after being Osman's captive and trying to get important information from Nikola.
- Semih igdigul as Governor Yargucu: Commander of Geyhatu and de facto ruler of Seljuk in Geyhatu's absence to become the Khan.

=== Season 3 ===
- Ridvan Uludaşdemir as Diego: A Catalan warrior and right-hand man of Anselmo. Killed by Malhun Hatun when he and Anselmo attacked Malhun and Osman.
- Hamza Güneysu as Serhan Alp: Alp of Turgut Bey.
- Dovletdzhan Yagshimuradov as Balaban Alp: A normal Selcuk soldier who joins Osman and becomes his Alp as he comes with a messenger of Sultan Alaeddin.

=== Season 4 ===
- Ceren Kesim as Esma Hatun: She is the adoptive daughter of Bengi Hatun and Oktem Bey. Alçiçek Hatun's best friend, adoptive sister and assistant. She was sent to Yenişehir by Bengi to spy on Osman and his hatuns but was later caught. She is killed by Valide Ismihan Sultan for helping Osman.
- Durukan Çelikkaya as Sultan Alaeddin: He is the son of Valide Ismihan Sultan and the Sultan of the Seljuk State after he dethrones Sultan Mesud. He is young and blind to the actions of his mother and close Viziers. He was later dethroned with the help of Osman and then taken to Gazan Khan along with his mother for his trial.
- Gokce Aydin as Prenses Ofelia: She is the daughter of Imparator Andronikos II. She is falsely accused of trying to kill her own father. Is captured and later killed by Frigg.
- Kadir Cicek as Aybars Alp: He is Bengi Hatun's nephew and her alp. Cousin of Alçiçek Hatun. He is loyal to his aunt and tribe. He helps Bengi in her works. He lives in Kargın Obası. Does not appear in Season 5.
- Tugrul Kizildemir as Kutlu Alp: Alp Of Ayse Hatun and previously a normal soldier of Osman who used to not show himself. Does not appear in Season 5.
- Cahit Ozturk as Saruja Alp: He is an alp of Osman in Yenişehir. He is martyred by Ismihan Sultan when he was caught spying on her for Osman.

=== Season 5 ===
- Çağıl Aydıner as Prenses Maria: She is the adoptive daughter of Imparator Andronikos. She is in love with a Turk in Constantinople. She was betrothed to Gorkulu Han for alliance between Byzantines and Mongols so that her lover doesn't die. After the death of Gorkulu Han, she is then engaged to Taccedin Noyan against her will. She helps Osman in order to kill Taceddin Noyan in order to escape to Konya and reunite with her lover.
- Javakhir Zakirov as Gorkulu Han. He is a Mongol prince. He was the supposed-fiancé of Prenses Maria. He is very furious and does not show any mercy. He raids Yenişehir and the Kayi Tribes. He is killed by Osman Bey in a trap.
- Melih Çardak as Taccedin Noyan: He is a Mongol lord and the nephew of Uljaytu Han. After the death of Gorkulu Han, he was the one supposed to marry Prenses Maria and form the alliance with the Byzantines. He gets beheaded by Osman Bey in Uc Bazar.
- Elif Savas as Gulce Hatun: She is the alp of Gonca Hatun and her assistant as well as friend. She forcefully spies on Gonca Hatun on the orders of Saddet Hatun. She is later forgiven by Gonca. She is friends with Fitnat Hatun.
- Goksu Girişken as Fitnat Hatun: She is the alp and the assistant of Saddet Hatun. She is best friends with Gulce Hatun. Like her lady, she is also arrogant and dislikes the Kayis. She spies and works on Saddet's order. She is very loyal to her Hatun. She goes to Kütahya with Saddet but later returns and stays with Gonca Hatun and the Kayis.
- Tuana Çoruk as Aysima Hatun: She is the daughter of a Turk Bey. She does business in Uc Bazar. Malhun Hatun wanted Orhan Bey to marry her as she was the daughter of a Turk Bey and a Muslim unlike Holofira. She saves Malhun's live during Karacelsun's raid. She dislikes Holofira for being the love interest of Orhan. Malhun later break relations with her when she attacks an innocent Holofira.
- Aybike Eniste as Kismet Hatun: She is the assistant and a close friend of Bala Hatun. At first, she is seen staying in Söğüt with Bala and helping her get better and cured. She later arrives in Yenişehir and later the Kayi tribe along with Bala. She is a talented warrior and is currently taking care of Holofira.
- Ozgur Rakar as Ayaz Alp: The oldest Alp of Osman like Boran. He was a substitute for Boran when he was heavily injured by Vasilus by calling Osman Bey out of his palace by alerting his people.

== Horses ==
- Osman: Karayel (killed by Bahadir Alp) - Black (S1-3) / Black (S3 -
- Bala: Alaca - White (S1 -

== Guest characters ==
This is a list of notable characters who have been guests in the series, meaning that they influenced the plot or the main characters in some episodes or were the main characters in those episodes:

- Serdar Gökhan as Süleyman Şah: The father of Ertuğrul Gazi, Gündoğdu Bey, Sungurtekin Bey and Dündar Bey. Adoptive father of Selcan Hatun, Turgut Bey and Bamsi Beyrek. The husband of Hayme Hatun and grandfather of Osman Bey, as well as his brothers and cousins. Legendary former long-serving Bey of Kayı tribe. He only appears in Osman Bey's dreams. Based on Suleyman Shah.
- Sezgin Erdemir as Sungurtekin Bey (works as a spy under the name, Hristo): The second son of Süleyman Şah and eldest son of Hayme Hatun. The elder brother of Ertuğrul Gazi and Dündar Bey, younger half-brother of Gündoğdu Bey. Osman Bey's uncle. Has a son and a daughter with an unknown wife. He works as a spy for the white bearded in the Margaret monks under a fake name Hristo. In Season 2 he is said to have been killed by the Byzantine emperor in unknown circumstances. Based on Sungurtekin Bey.
- Funda Güray as Aksu Hatun: A hatun who lived in Söğüt with her unknown mother. Helped Dundar Bey and Hazal Hatun in their schemes. Killed by Targun whilst saving Bala Hatun.
- Murat Ercanlı as İnal Bey: Targun's father and the Bey of a Cuman Turk tribe. He is reasonable, having his daughter marry a Muslim when she is a Tengrist and also not letting her ally against a Turk.
- Atılgan Gümüş as Komutan Böke (transl. Commander Böke): One of the commanders of Mongolian Viceroy Geyhatu
- Serkan Tatar as Pehlivan Alp/Derviş: A close friend of Şeyh Edebali, and one of his dervishes.
- Serhan Onat as Aybars Bey: Son of Bamsı Bey and Hafsa Hatun. The younger brother of Aslıhan Hatun. Close companion and adoptive cousin of Osman. Got martyred at very start of Season 1 devastating Bamsi Bey. Later Osman and Bamsi avenge his death.
- Yaşar Aydınlıoğlu as Tekfur Yorgopolos: Tekfur of Kulucahisar Castle. Seeks to rid his castle of traitors with the help of Osman. He wants peace with the Turks. Killed by Kalanos and Sofia.
- Hâzım Körmükçü as Tekfur Alexis: A tekfur of İnegöl castle. He wanted to rid the lands of all Turks for conquering Kulucahisar castle. Not to be confused with Season 1's Alexis. Killed by Nikola for his incompetence in the war he fought against Osman.
- Hazal Adıyaman as Prenses Adelfa (transl. Princess Adelfa): Niece of the Byzantine Emperor Michael VIII. Was to be the Hetaera of Mongol Han (Viceroy at the time), Geyhatu, thus creating an alliance between the Byzantines and the Mongols. Osman Bey saved her and took her away.
- Mehmet Ali Kaptanlar as the head of the White-Bearded Men in Season 1.
- Elif Cansu Akbiyik as Prenses Adelfa's servant: The Byzantines took her disguised as Princess Adelfa to deflect anyone who would attempt to save her. Killed by an arrow shot by a Byzantine soldier.
- Arslanbek Sultanbekov as the singer at Osman and Bala's wedding: Performed the song "Osman Bey".
- Hakan Ummak as Turhan Alp: Son of Ulu Bey, he comes from Germiyanids lands in order to fight wars alongside Osman Bey. He is a talented blacksmith as well as skillful at swords and archery. Helps Osman to capture Togay. Martyred in an ambush.
- Hazal Benli as Zoe Hatun: A fruit seller at Soğut. Spy of Tekfur Nikola. Love interest of Goktug Alp. She tried to kill Malhun Hatun and her baby by poisoning her food. Luckily Bala Hatun caught her in time and Gonca and Alaca put her in the caged tent. Later Goktug forced her to eat the poisoned food and die.
- Süreyya Gürsel Evren as Ivaz Bey: The bey of the Çavdar tribe. Umur Bey's brother, Malhun Hatun's uncle, Selvi Hatun's father, Barkın Bey's father-in-law
- Ferhat Yilmaz as Güngor Bey: A Germiyanids tribe's bey. Allies with vizier Alamshah against Mongols and Osman.

== Cast table ==
This is an overview of the cast. Some characters, who made little appearance, mainly minor or guest characters, are not included but are mentioned in the articles for each season. Supporting characters and minor characters (if mentioned) are classed as recurring characters.

Actor	Character	First appearance	Last appearance	Seasons					
Actor	Character	First appearance	Last appearance	1	2	3	4	5	6
Burak Özçivit	Osman Bey	1	194	Starring	Starring	Starring	Starring	Starring	Starring
Ozge Torer	Bala Hatun	1	194	Starring	Starring	Starring	Starring	Starring	Starring
Yildiz Cagri Atiksoy	Malhun Hatun	46	156		Starring	Starring	Starring	Starring	
Emre Bey	Orhan Bey	131	191					Starring	Starring
Ömer Faruk Aran	Alaeddin Ali Bey	131	194					Starring	Starring
Yiğit Uçan	Boran Bey	1	194	Starring	Starring	Starring	Starring	Starring	Starring
Çağrı Şensoy	Cerkutay Bey	10	194	Starring	Starring	Starring	Starring	Starring	Starring
Emre Basalak	Gündüz Bey	1	94	Starring	Starring	Starring			
Kanbolat Görkem Arslan	Savcı Bey	29	56		Starring				
Leya Kirsan	Fatma Hatun	131	194					Starring	Starring
Ecem Sena Bayir	Prenses Holofira	131	191					Starring	Starring
Belgin Şimşek	Gonca Hatun	131	194					Starring	Starring
Ruzgar Aksöy	Turgut Bey	65	124			Starring	Starring		
Alpaslan Ozmol	Gurbuz Alp	105	141				Recurring	Recurring	
Ragıp Savaş	Dündar Bey	1	54	Starring	Starring				
Tamer Yiğit	Ertuğrul Bey	28	42		Recurring				
Burak Çelik	Göktuğ Alp	10	79	Starring	Starring	Starring			
Buse Arslan	Aygül Hatun	1	98	Recurring	Recurring	Recurring			
Deniz Barut	Valide Ismihan Sultan	105	127				Recurring		
Nurettin Sönmez	Bamsı Beyrek	1	60	Starring	Starring				
Didem Balçın	Selcan Hatun	6	91	Recurring	Recurring	Recurring			
Açelya Özcan	Ayşe Hatun	1	130	Recurring	Recurring	Recurring	Recurring		
Seda Yıldız	Şeyh Edebali	2	124	Recurring	Recurring	Recurring	Recurring		
Emin Gürsoy	Kumral Abdal	28	130		Recurring	Recurring			
Baran Taha	Subasi Aktemur Bey	90	130			Recurring	Recurring		
Erkan Avcı	Tekfur Aya Nikola	28	94		Starring	Starring			
Teoman Kumbaracıbaşı	Kara Şaman Togay	57	62		Starring				
Ipek Karapinar	Frigg	99	118				Recurring		
Nihat Altinkaya	Olof	99	118				Recurring		
Yeşim Ceren Bozoğlu	Hazal Hatun	24	54	Guest	Recurring				
Ayşegül Günay Demir	Zöhre Hatun	1	24	Recurring					
Seray Kaya	Lena Hatun	29	56		Recurring				
Ahmet Yenilmez	Demirci Davud (Note: Not to be confused with Demirci Bey, an antagonist in Season 1.)	28	98		Recurring				
Baris Yalcinsoy	Isaac / Karamusa Alp / Shaman	86	TBA						
Serkan Arslan	Avci Bey	105	115						
Tugrul Kizildemir	Kutlu Alp	20	TBA						
Dovletdzhan Yagshimuradov	Bälaban Alp	74	TBA						
Cüneyt Arkın	Aksakal leader (Note: Season 2)	28	TBA		Recurring				
Turpal Tölkaev	Turahan Alp	76	TBA						
Ali Karagac	Acar Alp	65	123						
Burak Yenilmez	Kutan Alp	65	123						
Hamza Gunëysu	Serhan Alp	51	82						
Bahtiyar Engin	David / İdris	28	46		Recurring				
Emel Dede	Gonca Hatun	1	71	Recurring	Recurring				
Celal Al	Abdurrahman Gazi	9	52	Recurring	Recurring				
Hasan Üner	Epharistos Kalanoz	52	56		Recurring				
İsmail Hakkı Ürün	Samsa Çavuş	2	16	Recurring					
Samet Aksoy	Oguz Alp	1	TBA						
Yusuf Korkmaz	Salguraģa Alp	63	TBA						
Ismail Alan	Yagiz Alp	14	TBA	Starring	Starring	Starring			
Hakkan Oncu	Dumrel Alp	20	TBA	Starring	Starring	Starring			
Ozgu Rakar	Ayaz Alp	1	TBA	Starring	Starring	Starring			
Kemal Ärda	Cinar Alp	33	TBA						
Begum Cagla Taskin	Ulgen Hatun	99	TBA						
Hamit Erenturk	Shahin Bey	99	121						
Çağkan Çulha	Bahadır Bey	19	27	Recurring					
Jaffa DZ	Shameel Alp	90	TBA						
Cahit Ozturk	Sarija Alp	1	106						
Murat Boncuk	Aykurt Alp	60	TBA						
Umut Karadağ	Yavlak Arslan	28	44		Recurring				
Maruf Otajonov	Geyhatu	30	86		Recurring				
Seçkin Özdemir	Komutan Flatyos	28	48		Recurring				
Alma Terzić	Prensesi Sofia	1	27	Starring					
Yurdaer Okur	Komutan Balgay	10	26	Recurring					
Tuğrul Çetiner	Efendi Yannis	1	18	Recurring					
Saruhan Hünel	Alişar Bey	1	23	Recurring					
Zeynep Tuğçe Bayat	Targun Hatun	34	46		Recurring				
Akbarxo'ja Rasulov	Noyan Subutay	23	26	Guest					
Ekrem İspir	Möngke Han	29	33		Guest				
Abdül Süsler	Komutan Kalanoz	1	8	Recurring					
Atılgan Gümüş	Komutan Böke	19	24	Guest					
Ayşen Gürler	Helen	1	64	Recurring	Recurring				
Şevket Çapkınoğlu	Megala	1	7	Recurring					
Burak Sarımola	Andreas	2	15	Recurring					
Uğur Aslan	Nizamettin	1	11	Recurring					
Hâzım Körmükçü	Tekfur Alexis (Note: Not to be confused with Alexis, who worked for Sofia.)	28	28		Guest				
Sercan Sert	Theokoles	2	3	Guest					
Mehmet Sabri Arafatoğlu	Demirci Bey (Note: Not to be confused with Demirci Davud, the blacksmith of the Kayı tribe in Season 2.)	2	27	Recurring					
Murat Karak	Şahin Bey	2	27	Recurring					
Volkan Basaran	Zorba	1	19	Recurring					
Eray Türk	Melik	15	22	Recurring					
Gökmen Bayraktar	Kuzgun Bey	28	30		Guest				
Nizamettin Özkaya	Alexis (Note: Not to be confused with Tefkur Alexis of İnegöl Castle.)	24	25	Guest					
Mert Turak	Petrus	40	56		Recurring				
Oğuz Kara	Ahmet Alp	28	74		Recurring				
Ömer Ağan	Saltuk Alp	1	89	Recurring	Recurring	Recurring			
Mohammad Mertoglu	Görkluce Alp	109	TBA	Recurrin	Recurrin	Recurrin			
Zabit Samedov	Gence Bey	35	TBA		Recurring				
Eren Vurdem	Konur Alp	2	26	Starring					
Eren Hacısalihoğlu	Batur Bey	1	15	Recurring					
Fatih Ayhan	Baysungur Alp	28	169		Recurring				
Atilla Güzel	Ayaz Alp	12	38	Recurring	Recurring				
Tolga Akkaya	Dumrul Alp	12	45	Recurring	Recurring				
Latif Koru	Sıddık Alp	3	27	Recurring					
Muammer Çagatay Keser	Kılıç Alp	1	21	Recurring					
Kani Katkici	Erkut Alp	1	16	Recurring					
Mete Deran	Çetin Alp	2	27	Recurring					
Ercan Kabadayi	Boğaç Alp	1	10	Recurring					
Kaya Demirkiran	Demirbüken Alp	1	6	Recurring					
Kadir Terzi	Kanturali Alp	1	6	Recurring					
Kadir Polatçi	Yaman Alp	1	10	Recurring					
Noyan Uzer	Frodi	99	TBA						
Caner Nalbantaoglu	Dan	99	117						
Hamed Almaqtary	Tacir	83	83	Guest					
Fatih Osmanlı	Sancar Alp	1	27	Recurring					
Sezanur Sözer	Eftalya	28	44		Recurring				
Kahraman Sivri	Arito Üsta	28	44		Recurring				
Ahmet Kılıç	Zülfikar Derviş	2	51	Recurring	Recurring				
Ali Sinan Demir	Tursun Fakıh	1	10	Recurring					
Murat Ercanlı	İnal Bey	35	43		Guest				
Sezgin Erdemir	Sungurtekin Bey	19	19	Guest					
Aslıhan Karalar	Burçin Hatun	1	27	Recurring					
Yağızkan Dikmen	Bayhoca	40	48		Recurring				
Abidin Yerebakan	Akça Derviş	2	TBA	Recurring	Recurring				
Serkan Tatar	Pehlivan Derviş	2	27	Recurring					
Serhan Onat	Aybars Bey	1	1	Guest					
Yaşar Aydınlıoğlu	Tekfur Yorgopolos	1	2	Guest					
Hazal Adiyaman	Princess Adelfa	17	23	Guest					
Yıldız Kültür	Şifacı Rabi'a Ana	28	28	Guest					
Kuzey Yücehan	Köni	14	14	Guest					
Funda Güray	Aksu Hatun	43	45		Guest				

== Casting ==
=== Malhun Hatun ===
The series was initially named Diriliş: Osman. Aslıhan Karalar, the actress who played Burçin Hatun, was imagined to play the role of Malhun Hatun, who did not appear in the first season. Aslıhan Karalar was the first actress confirmed to join the series. However, in series, Osman's first partner is Bala hatun who was played by Turkish actress Özge Törer. This was only verified after the series' first episode. Before Season 2, Özge Yağız and Yağmur Öztürk were expected to play the role of Malhun Hatun due to the fact that they both shared videos of them taking fencing lessons. This thought was dropped after Özge Yağız took part in the TV series Sol Yanım and Yağmur Öztürk took part in the TV series Acemi Anneler. Yağmur Öztürk was still, however, rumoured to play the role at some point. The 43rd episode trailer then revealed that Funda Güray was likely to play this role, however, it turned out that she would portray Aksu Hatun. It was later confirmed that Yıldız Çağrı Atiksoy would play the part.

=== Ertuğrul Gazi ===
Mehmet Bozdağ said there will be a surprise about this character in Kuruluş: Osman while Engin Altan Düzyatan, who plays Ertuğrul in Diriliş: Ertuğrul, said that he may give a surprise, but "no clear decision can be made". He may later appear in some dreams (like Süleyman Şah) or in a flashback. Ertuğrul was at first thought to appear in Season 1. When he didn't appear, he was thought to be played by Engin Altan and appear in the second season. Other rumours indicated that Ediz Hun would play his role. The character's appearance was When the first trailer was released, it was confirmed that Tamer Yiğit would portray Ertuğrul.

== See also ==
- List of Diriliş: Ertuğrul characters
- List of Kuruluş: Osman episodes
- List of awards and nominations received by Kuruluş: Osman
