= Kuruluş: Osman season 3 =

2022 Turkish television season

Kuruluş: Osman
- Season 3
- Starring: Burak Özçivit; Yıldız Çağrı Atiksoy; Özge Törer; Yiğit Uçan
- No. of episodes: 34

Release
- Original network: ATV
- Original release: 6 October 2021 – 15 June 2022

Season chronology
- ← Previous; Season 2

The third season of the Turkish TV series Kuruluş: Osman, created by Mehmet Bozdağ, premiered on 6 October 2021 and concluded on 15 June 2022. Filming for the season began in late August 2021.

== Production ==
The season was written and produced by Mehmet Bozdağ and directed by Metin Günay.

=== Filming ===
The season continues filming from the second season in Riva, Beykoz. Arif Alvi, the President of Pakistan, visited the Seljuk palace and Kayı tribe sets in Beykoz in August 2021. Filming of the season began on 30 August 2021.

=== Music ===
The theme music is by Zeynep Alasya. Alpay Göktekin, who composed the theme music for the previous season, died on 5 May 2020, so therefore, could only compose the music for season one of the series.

== Release ==
The season was released on October 9, 2022 and had 37 episodes altogether.

== Cast ==
=== Main characters ===
- Burak Özçivit as Osman Bey
- Yıldız Çağrı Atiksoy as Malhun Hatun
- Özge Törer as Bala Hatun
- Ruzgar Aksoy as Turgut Bey
- Yiğit Uçan as Boran Alp
- Burak Çelik as Göktug Alp
- Erkan Avcı as Aya Nikola

=== Supporting characters ===
- Didem Balçın as Selcan Hatun
- Seda Yıldız as Şeyh Edebali
- Çağrı Şensoy as Cerkutay
- Buse Arslan as Aygül Hatun
- Emel Dede as Gonca Hatun until ep. 71
- Şahin Ergüney as Ömer Bey

=== Minor characters ===
- Ömer Ağan as Saltuk Alp
- Emin Gürsoy as Kumral Abdal
- Ahmet Yenilmez as Demirci Davud
- Zabit Samedov as Gence Bey
- Oğuz Kara as Ahmet Alp
- Fatih Ayhan as Baysungur Alp
- Abidin Yerebakan as Akça Derviş
- Ahmet Kaynak as Bahadır Bey
- Gözel Rovshanova as Alaca Hatun

== Episodes ==
| No. overall | No. in season |
|---|---|
| 65 | 1 |
Pope Gregor has escaped from Emperor Andronikos II's prison, and is coming to take refuge with his old friend Rogatus Laskaris, Tekfur of Bilecik Castle. At the meeting place, Rogatus' right-hand man Theodor, a group of Catalans, and the Kayi Bey Osman (disguised in Byzantine attire), all compete to capture Gregor. Eventually, Osman captures Gregor and his assistant Andreas. Theodor reports his failure to Rogatus, who mistakenly believes that Michael Kosses, Tekfur of Hermankaya Castle, captured Gregor, while the Catalan leader Anselmo goes to Kosses, who had hired him to capture Gregor, to report his own failure. Back in Kayi tribe, Bala Hatun has not told anybody except Gonca of her pregnancy. However, Malhun Hatun's helper Gokce overhears their conversation and tells Malhun, causing Malhun to fear for the future of her son, Orhan. That evening, Rogatus and Kosses go to Inegol Castle for a dinner with the Tekfur Aya Nikola, where they agree to form a union against Osman after Nikola suspects him of capturing Gregor. The next day, Turgut Bey, an independent Turkmen Bey living in Kayi lands, raids the caravan of Kosses' sister, Mari and takes her to his tribe. While bringing her food, he saves her from a snake bite, and then reveals that his reason for capturing her is to use her as a bargaining chip to get back his own alps that were captured by Kosses. Kosses goes to Osman and asks for his help in getting Mari back from Turgut. Osman meets Turgut and offers to take Mari to Kosses and bring back Turgut's alps. Boran, Goktug and Cerkutay bring Mari to Kosses, and take Turgut's alps back. However, Kosses's soldiers attack and kill all of Turgut's alps on the way back, leaving Osman's alps ashamed and devastated. Upon hearing this, Osman prepares for revenge, but discovers that someone has killed his horse, Karayel.

== Future ==
Season 3 was released on 9 October. Filming took place in Riva, Beykoz.
