= Halime Hatun (character) =

- Diriliş: Ertuğrul character
- Esra Bilgiç as Halime Hatun
- First appearance: "Pilot" (2014)
- Last appearance: "Halime oğlu Osman" (2018)
- Based on: Halime Hatun
- Adapted by: Mehmet Bozdağ
- Portrayed by: Esra Bilgiç

In-universe information
- Full name: Numan'ın kızı Halime Hatun (Note: transl. Halime Hatun, daughter of Numan)
- Alias: Halime Sultan
- Nickname: "Ceylan" (Note: nickname given by Ertuğrul, transl. "Gazelle")
- Position: Hanım; Princess
- Affiliation: Kayı tribe Sultanate of Rum; Kınık tribe (bloodline)
- Weapon: Sword
- Family: Şehzade Numan (father); Yiğit Alp (brother)
- Spouse: Ertuğrul Gazi
- Children: Gündüz Bey (son); Savcı Bey (son); Osman Bey (son)
- Relatives: Alaeddin Keykubat (uncle); Hayme Ana (mother-in-law); Selcan Hatun (sister-in-law); Dündar Bey (brother-in-law); Malhun Hatun (daughter-in-law); Bala Hatun (daughter-in-law); Ayşe Hatun (daughter-in-law); Lena Hatun (daughter-in-law)
- Religion: Islam
- Origin: Konya
- Nationality: Selçuk; Oğuz Turkish

Halime Hatun, also known as Halime Sultan due to her royal status, is a character in the Turkish TV series Diriliş: Ertuğrul. Halime is portrayed by Turkish actress Esra Bilgiç and the character is based on the alleged mother of Osman I, Halime Hatun. In the series, she is shown as a Seljuk princess and Ertuğrul's first wife.

== Background ==
Halime Sultan grew up in her uncle Sultan Alaeddin Keykubat's palace. Born to Şehzade Numan, she spent several years with her father and brother in exile, fleeing from traitors and tyrants. When she was captured by the Templar knight Bisol, she and her family were saved by Ertuğrul, after Halime's father called for help when Ertuğrul was hunting a gazelle.

=== Personality ===
Halime is portrayed as a loyal woman, who is ready to do anything for Ertuğrul and is a great, loving mother for her children. She is also a skilled fighter along with an intelligent and respected Hanım. Her official description on the TRT 1 website says: "The daughter of a fugitive Turkmen prince, Halime can overcome any problem thanks to her patience and intelligence."

== Storyline ==
=== Season 1 ===
Halime Sultan, her brother Şehzade Yiğit, and her father Şehzade Numan are rescued by Ertuğrul who were being taken to the Templars. When Ertuğrul takes them to the tribe, they aren't welcomed by two people, Ertugrul's eldest adoptive sister and sister-in-law, Selçan Hatun, and Ertugrul's younger adoptive sister, Gökçe Hatun. Selçan is devious, wanting Ertugrul to marry Gökçe in order to fulfil her plan to kill the Kayı Bey, Süleyman Şah - her adoptive father - as he killed her biological father for betraying him. Whilst, Gökçe has an unrequited love for Ertuğrul.

As days pass, Ertuğrul and Halime fall in love with one another. It is later revealed that Halime and her father and brother are members of the Seljuk royal family and are wanted by the Templars for this reason. However, after Ertuğrul is saved by her in a Templars' ambush, Halime is taken to Aleppo where Emir El Aziz, the Ayyubid Emir of Aleppo, falls in love with her. When Sehzade Numan, who is later killed by Afşin Bey - a Seljuk operative, attempts to force his daughter to marry El Aziz so that he can become the Sultan of the Selçuk Empire, and after a series of other events, Halime is taken back to the Kayı. Some of the other issues that Ertuğrul had with the Emir because of the Templars are resolved. This leads to Ertuğrul and Halime's engagement after Gökçe tells Süleyman Şah to end her own engagement with Ertugrul, realising he will never see her as anything but a sister and that he is in love with Halime.

However, when Kurdoğlu Bey, Süleyman Şah's adoptive brother, betrays him and decides to become the Bey, Halime is captured, with a plan to eventually kill her. Halime is later rescued and saved by Ertuğrul's adoptive brother, Turgut Alp. During this, Selçan Hatun repents for her sins and asks for Halime's forgiveness for the way she treated her which Halime grants. From then on, Halime and Selçan become close friends and regard one another as sisters. After Kurdoğlu is defeated and beheaded by Ertuğrul, Ertuğrul and Halime marry one another. Süleyman Şah later dies from a combination of a boil infection and drowning which leads to the Kayı Tribe moving to Erzurum.

=== Season 2–4 ===
In the second season, Halime announces to Ertuğrul that she is pregnant with a baby boy. She becomes devastated however when Ertuğrul is captured by Noyan, a Mongol commander, and is then thought dead. She becomes happy again upon his return but when she tells Hayme Hatun, Ertuğrul's mother, about a nail that was nailed into Ertuğrul's hand, his position as Alpbaşı (transl. Chief Alp) is revoked, causing him to become angry at Halime. However, their issues are later resolved. Halime also supports her sister-in-law, Selcan, face Aytolun Hatun - the devious Hanım of the Dodurga Tribe, Hayme Hatun's birth tribe and the tribe that the Kayı are forced to stay with after a Mongol attack. Towards the end of the season, after a failed attempt on her life by Aytolun and after Noyan is defeafed, Ertuğrul's son is born, named Gündüz. Halime supports her husband in his decision to migrate west whilst Ertuğrul's elder brothers, Gündoğdu Bey and Sungurtekin Bey, wish to migrate east. The Kayi Tribe then divides with Halime tearfully bidding farewell to Selcan, who goes with her husband, Gündoğdu, east. On the journey, Halime is devastated upon the death of her brother, Yiğit, as a result of Sadettin Köpek's, a Seljuk Vizier's, ambush.

In the third season, Halime faces Aslıhan Hatun, Hanim of the Çavdar Tribe, who falls in love with Ertuğrul. After a series of events, their enmity is resolved and they become close friends. Halime is also shown as a powerful Hanım in the season working alongside her mother-in-law, Hayme Hatun. She also gives birth to Ertuğrul's second son, Savcı.

In the fourth season, Halime and the rest of the Kayı face the wrath of Emir Sadettin Köpek. Ertuğrul takes Halime with him to the Seljuk Royal Palace in Konya, the Seljuk capital city, in an attempt to expose Köpek's crime to Halime's uncle, Sultan Alaeddin, as she is familiar with the Palace and how it operates. Aslıhan Hatun is later killed by Köpek but avenged by Aslıhan's husband, Turgut, and Ertuğrul who kill Köpek. Halime later dies after giving birth to Ertuğrul's third and final son, Osman, leaving Ertuğrul, Hayme and Gündüz devastated.

=== Season 5 and Kuruluş: Osman ===
In the fifth season, having died 10 years prior, she is generally only referred to in passing. She is mentioned by her sister-in-law, Hafsa Hatun, the wife of Ertuğrul's adoptive brother, Bamsı Bey, who states that "stories of Ertuğrul and Halime's legendary love have been told." She has also been mentioned a few other times by other people, including Ertuğrul. Despite her only being mentioned a few times, she significantly influenced the plot and was a minor obstacle in Ertuğrul and İlbilge Hatun's marriage. Osman is also shown to be very attached to his mother, despite not remembering her, as he was the only son of Ertuğrul who opposed his marriage to İlbilge (but later accepted). After Aybars, Bamsı's son, was rescued from the Mongols and he went forward to hug his mother, Osman was shown to be very upset, clutching a scarf that belonged to his mother, as he also craved the attention and love of a mother. He is comforted by Selçan Hatun who tells him she will be a mother to him.

Halime is later mentioned in Kuruluş: Osman, the sequel series, referred to by Selcan in a conversation with Osman in the first season, and by an unwell Ertuğrul in the second season who goes to her grave and describes their imminent reunion in the afterlife, as well as being remembered by him in his prayers along with his other family members and friends who had died. Osman is seen smelling the scarf that he possesses that belonged to his mother. He gifts the scarf to his wife, Bala Hatun, who is very pleased.

== Positions ==
After Ertuğrul moved to the western borders with a portion of the Kayı, as Halime was the new Bey's wife, she became the Hanım, leader of the Hatuns of the tribe, succeeding Hayme Hatun.

Hanıms of the Kayı tribe (in fiction)
}}

Süleyman Şah's mother
Hayme Hatun (Note: She also became the ruling Bey after her husband's death.)
Halime Hatun	Selcan Hatun
Hayme Hatun	Unknown (Note: Presumably Sungurtekin Bey's wife or daughter.)
İlbilge Hatun (Note: It is thought that she died or disappeared between Diriliş: Ertuğrul and Kuruluş: Osman. Therefore, it is likely that Hayme Hatun, who also died in this period, or someone else, became the Hanım for some time before Selcan's arrival.) (Note: Zöhre becomes the substitute Hanım while Ertuğrul is in Konya, along with her husband being the Bey, before Selcan's arrival. During the journey from Kuruluş Osman to Kuruluş Orhan, after Bala Hatun’s death, Malhun Hatun became the hanim of kayi tribe)
Selcan Hatun
Bala Hatun
Malhun Hatun
Nilufer Hatun

== Casting and training ==
Esra Bilgiç, who portrays the role of Halime Hatun, began her career with Diriliş: Ertuğrul in 2014. Bilgiç left the series in 2018 due to the script of the new season, she said,

"We end the character of Halime Sultan, who I played with great love and great desire for every scene I spent for four full years, due to the fact that the story of the new season will be different. I am grateful to you for loving and owning me so much, for seeing me as one of your family, your home, from the very beginning to this day..."

Even after the series had ended, Bilgiç posted videos of her training and the hard-work and effort she had put in for the series with videos of her sword-fights and her going to the gym.

== Reception ==
Her death in the series was mourned by surprised Turkish fans on the Internet. The actress' lead role was "replaced" by Hande Soral, who was at first thought to play the role of 'Zeydan Hatun', but ended up portraying the role of İlbilge Hatun.

=== Pakistan ===
Like other actors who participated in the series, Esra Bilgiç, who plays the role of Halime, also became extremely popular in Pakistan. In 2020, she was recorded as the ninth-most-searched person in Pakistan and she became the brand ambassador of the Pakistani cricket team Peshawar Zalmi, which she has been criticised for by Pakistani actors as she "took their job", consumer electronics company QMobile and mobile network provider Jazz in 2020.

Alongside all this, she has also appeared in many Pakistani ads. Bilgiç, who once revealed "how she was humbled by the love she had received in the country", also shared a viral video of her learning Pakistani slang. After Priyanka Chopra, the UN goodwill ambassador, snubbed a Pakistani girl for calling out against her for warmongering, Esra Bilgic also tweeted about this and said, "Being patriotic doesn’t mean you should encourage war. You shouldn’t belong in a conversation concerning war as a UN goodwill ambassador. You were so disrespectful against a woman who just asked you a question about a statement that you shared with millions of people on your Twitter account." As the actress is a model in Pakistan, a video of her in the Pakistani national dress shalwar kameez also became a topic of interest on social media.

Despite some negative comments, mostly by men, against her for wearing "western clothes" while playing the role of a "religious" Halime Sultan, her fan base is still growing in Pakistan for her role in the series. She even hit out at someone once for their comments saying "a little advice; don't follow me". It is also rumoured that she will be visiting the country too (or that she was even in the country) after she posted an image of the Islamia University Peshawar with a caption saying "City of Flowers" on her Instagram account. As she is a brand ambassador for Peshawar Zalmi, it is thought that she may come to watch the cricket event Pakistan Super League, after this picture and exact same post by Javed Afridi, the CEO of Haier Pakistan and owner of Peshawar Zalmi.

After a woman was gang-raped in Pakistan in 2020, Bilgiç criticized the Lahore Capital City Police Officer (CCPO) Umer Sheikh when he blamed the woman for driving alone and saying that it was her fault. Among her fans is Pakistani actress Ayesha Omer, who also said that she would like to meet her. Like aforementioned, she received criticism by Pakistani actors for becoming a brand ambassador in their country, due to this, she received support by Pakistani actor-singer Agha Ali to continue with her work. Bilgiç also tried a range of Pakistani foods in a viral video powered by Jazz (one of the brands she is an ambassador of), she commented on the foods being very spicy and that biryani was her favourite.

=== Accolades ===
Bilgiç has won two awards for her role as Halime Hatun, the Social Awareness Awards, in the category Best TV Series Actress, and the Anatolia Media Awards in the category TV Series Actress of the Year, both in 2016. In 2017, she was also nominated for the Turkey Youth Awards in the category Best TV Actress.

== In other media ==
Ertugrul Bey's wife was portrayed as Hayme Ana in the Turkish television series Kuruluş/Osmancık (1988), adapted from a novel by the same name.

== See also ==
- List of Diriliş: Ertuğrul characters
- List of Kuruluş: Osman characters
