= Esra Bilgiç =

Turkish actress (born 1992)

- Born: 14 October 1992 (age 33); Ankara, Turkey
- Occupation: Actress
- Years active: 2014–present
- Spouse: Gökhan Töre (m. 2017; div. 2019)

Esra Bilgiç (Turkish: [esˈɾaː bilˈɟitʃ]; born 14 October 1992) is a Turkish actress. She is best known for playing Halime Hatun in the Turkish historical adventure television series Diriliş: Ertuğrul from 2014 to 2018. Among other roles, she starred in the 2020–2021 crime drama Ramo.

== Career ==
Bilgiç was born on 14 October 1992 in Ankara, Turkey. In 2014, she made her television debut in the Turkish historical adventure series Diriliş: Ertuğrul on TRT 1, alongside co-actors Engin Düzyatan and Hülya Darcan. The story of the series is centred around the life of Ertuğrul Bey, the father of Ottoman dynasty founder Osman Bey. Bilgiç played the role of Halime Hatun, mother of Osman, but left in 2018, due to changes in the new season.

She also appeared in Bir Umut Yeter alongside Tolgahan Sayışman and Hazal Subaşı. In 2020, Bilgiç appeared in a leading role in the Turkish film Adanış Kutsal Kavga with co-star İsmail Filiz. She is the female lead in the Turkish crime-drama television series Ramo with co-star Murat Yıldırım. Outside of Turkey, Bilgiç has seen wide popularity in Pakistan, leading her to become the brand ambassador of the Pakistani cricket team Peshawar Zalmi, consumer electronics company QMobile and mobile network provider Jazz in 2020.

From September 2021 until February 2022, she shared the lead role in the period drama Kanunsuz Topraklar with actor Uğur Güneş. The series was canceled after 16 episodes due to poor ratings.

In March 2022, Bilgiç appeared in a Victoria's Secret commercial for the "Love Cloud" collection.

== Personal life ==
As of 2024, she is studying law at Marmara University. In 2015, Bilgiç began dating a professional Turkish footballer, Gökhan Töre. The couple got married on 21 October 2017, and divorced on 17 June 2019. Turkish President Recep Tayyip Erdoğan and First Lady Emine Erdoğan were present at Bilgiç's wedding.

In August 2021, after the Taliban takeover of Afghanistan, Bilgiç posted retweets with hashtags including "I don’t want refugees in my country" and "I don’t want Afghans here." She later removed the retweets. Dawn described the original tweets as "hateful".

== Filmography ==
Digital Series
Year	Title	Role	Note
2024	Zamanın Kapıları		Leading role
2024	Bir İhtimal Daha Var	Seda Saygun	Leading role

TV series
Year	Title	Role	Note
2014–2018	Diriliş: Ertuğrul	Halime Hatun	Leading role
2018	Bir Umut Yeter	Derya Akar	Leading role
2020–2021	Ramo	Sibel Yıldırım Kaya	Leading role
2021–2022	Kanunsuz Topraklar	Gülfem Paşazade	Leading role

Films
Year	Title	Role	Note
2022	Adanış Kutsal Kavga	Cemre Haznedar	Leading role
2023	Atatürk	Madame Corrine	Supporting role
2024	Atatürk ll	Madame Corrine	Supporting role
2024	Romantik Hırsız	Alin	Leading role

== Awards and nominations ==
Bilgiç has won several awards. Some of them are:

Awards
Year	Awards Ceremony	Category	Project	Result	Ref.
2014	Antalya TV Awards	Best female actress in series	Diriliş: Ertuğrul	Won	
2015	Sosyal Farkındalık Ödülleri	Best female actress in series	Diriliş: Ertuğrul	Won	
2015	18. Sadri Alışık Theatre and Cinema Awards	Best female actress	Diriliş: Ertuğrul	Won	
2016	Anadolu Media Ödülleri	Best actress in series	Diriliş: Ertuğrul	Won	
2016	Türkiye Gençlik Ödülleri	Best female actress	Diriliş: Ertuğrul	Won	
