= Malhun Hatun (Kuruluş: Osman) =

Main Female Protagonist Character in Turkish TV series

- Kuruluş: Osman; Kuruluş: Orhan character
- Yıldız Çağrı Atiksoy as Malhun Hatun
- First appearance: "Hainler Temizlenecek" (2021)
- Last appearance: 12 June 2024
- Based on: Malhun Hatun
- Adapted by: Mehmet Bozdağ
- Portrayed by: Yıldız Çağrı Atiksoy; Bennu Yıldırımlar - Kurulus Orhan

In-universe information
- Full name: Malhun Hatun
- Title: Devlet Ana (Mother of state)
- Position: Bey Hatun, Hanim
- Affiliation: Bayındır tribe; Kayı tribe; Ottoman Empire
- Weapon: Sword, Bow & arrow
- Family: Ömer Bey (father); Three brothers (Note: Martyred)
- Spouse: Osman Bey
- Children: Orhan (son); Fatma Hatun (daughter); Alaeddin Pasha (step-son); Halime Hatun (step-daughter)
- Relatives: Kızıl Bey (grandfather); Ertuğrul Gazi (father-in-law); Halime Hatun (mother-in-law); Selcan Hatun (aunt-in-law); Gunduz Bey (brother-in-law); Ayşe Hatun (sister-in-law); Savcı Bey (brother-in-law); Lena Hatun (sister-in-law); Bala Hatun (co-wife); Efendize Elçim Hatun (daughter-in-law); Nilufer Hatun (daughter-in-law)
- Religion: Islam
- Nationality: Oğuz Turkish

Malhun Hatun was one of the main female protagonists in the Turkish TV series Kuruluş: Osman portrayed by Yıldız Çağrı Atiksoy. She was based on Malhun Hatun, wife of Osman Gazi. She was the second wife of the character Osman Bey.

== Background ==
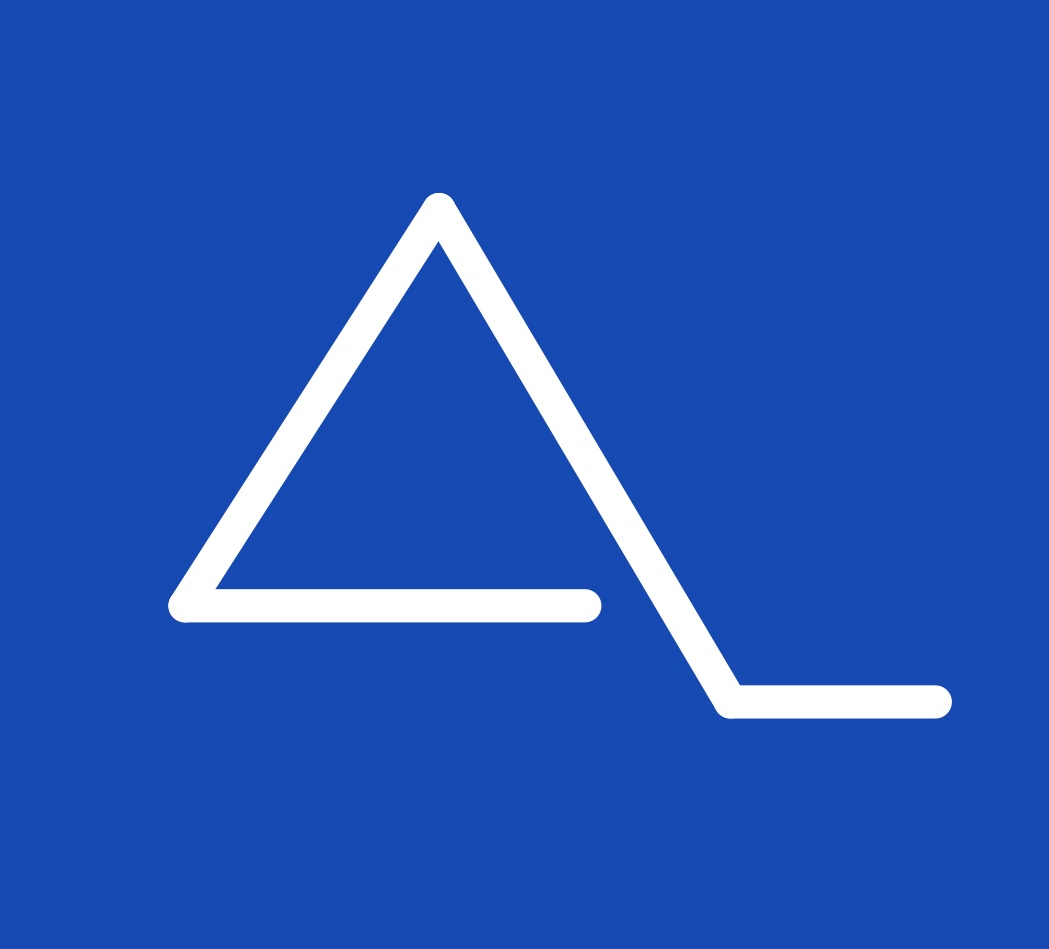
Flag of the Bayındır tribe

Malhun's mother died when she was a young girl. She was raised by her father Ömer Bey and saw her brothers fall as martyrs one after the other as she grew up. She showed her father that she was nothing less than a son and does everything she can possibly do for him.

=== Personality ===
Malhun has more of an assertive personality. Her fighting skills are on par with many male fighters, and she has the ability to lead a squad in battle. She has faced losses but plays an influential role in Kayı Obası and is a constant companion to Osman Bey.

== Storyline ==
=== Season 2 ===
After saving Osman Bey from Aya Nikola, Malhun arrives in the Kayı tribe. Malhun tells Osman that she is trying to find a place for her tribe to reside which results in Osman giving her some land in Bithynia. Malhun decides to help Osman find the traitors in the Kayı but, not trusting Osman Bey, she does not tell Osman when she finds Dündar's ring at the same place where the traitor İdris was killed by the more powerful traitor who wanted to cover up his tracks. She is wounded by Togay and later captured by Nikola, although later freed. She is eventually subjected to Osman's anger for hiding the ring after her father gives it to Osman. She later regrets hiding the ring and seemingly develops feelings for Osman Bey, troubling her father. Osman then initiates a major battle with the Byzantines, with the support of Malhun Hatun which is historically known as the Battle of Domanic She later marries Osman after he is advised by Edebali to marry another woman to get heir for his beylik and becomes pregnant soon after - giving birth to Osman's eldest son, Orhan.

=== Season 3 ===
Malhun, who learns that Bala Hatun is pregnant, engages in a power struggle with Bala and the conflict between the two Hatuns also seemingly affects the people of the tribe. But Selcan Hatun puts an end to any further conflicts by advising all the Hatuns of the tribe to work amicably. Their relationship takes a turn for the better, when Malhun Hatun decides to entrust Orhan to Bala Hatun, while she accompanies Osman Bey and his alps on his conquest.

During Osman and Malhun's time away, they have very heartfelt scenes together. Malhun expresses to Osman how she feels about Bala and her pregnancy, and Osman comforts her and tells her that he will always love her and to rest assured.

When the Kayi tribe is targeted by the Seljuk Vizier, Alamshah, Osman is framed for an assassination attempt on Sultan Mesud. Due to this, Gunduz Bey, Osman's brother, becomes the acting Bey of the tribe. He falls under Alamshah's influence and exiles Malhun, Bala and Selcan Hatun from the tribe - separating Malhun from Orhan. She later sneaks into the tribe with Aygul Hatun and takes him back and stands headstrongly against Gunduz and Alamshah, Osman eventually clears his name and they are all able to return to the tribe. However, tragedy strikes for Malhun as her father, Omer Bey, along with his loyal soldiers are secretly killed in a massacre by Barkin Bey, a traitorous bey who is engaged to Malhun's cousin, Selvi Hatun. She buries her father and vows to find his killers.

Several years have passed and Osman's strength and power has heightened with time. Orhan and Alaeddin Ali are kidnapped to lure Osman into a trap but Malhun works with Osman and Bala to rescue them from Bilicek Castle - which is later conquered. However, the same day Osman returns from Bilicek, victorious, is the same day Osman's adoptive mother, Selcan Hatun, dies - leaving everyone devastated. While the preparations for the Inegol conquest are underway, Osman's daughter Fatma who was sent to the highlands, returns to the tribe to the joy of her close ones.

=== Season 4 ===
In this season, The Kayi tribe has moved to a palace named ‘Yenisehir’. Malhun administrates the trade system of Yenisehir with the help of Aktemur and Ayse Hatun. With the arrival of Selcuk Valide Sultan Ismihan, Osman bey and Kayi tribe face major difficulties and Malhun resolves certain issues like such as when İsmihan Sultan spreads illness in Söğüt and Malhun takes care of people of Sogut and when Ismihan stops the goods for trade in the market of Yenişehir, Malhun goes herself to procure the goods, and gives a fitting response to Ismihan.Malhun demonstrates great patience when Orhan is paralysed after being given a poison at the command of Valide İsmihan. However, Malhun forgives Esma Hatun, who had poisoned her son Orhan. Valide İsmihan accuses Esma of murder attempt and falsely accuses herself of being injured, leading to Malhun being imprisoned. Malhun finds that she is pregnant again while in jail. When Osman Bey hears this, he immediately confronts İsmihan in anger and, with the help of Bala Hatun in court, proves Malhun's innocence. When Malhun tells Osman that she is pregnant, he becomes very happy. At the end of the season, Malhun gives Orhan a symbol of his grandfather, which is a ring, and tells him that she will always be there for him.

=== Season 5 ===
In season 5, set up years after the season 4, Malhun's status appears to have increased significantly. There is no further mention of her third child, which means she probably miscarried or the baby was dead. However, Orhan, Alaeddin and Fatma are now adults.In this season, the family faces internal and external challenges as Osman pursues the expansion of the Ottoman domain.

One of Malhun Hatun's significant arcs involves her clashes with Saadet Hatun. Recognizing Saadet's animosity, Malhun devises clever strategies to maintain her position and ensure stability within the Kayi tribe.Malhun is also shown to be deeply involved in the tribe's defense when Mongol forces, led by Karacelasun, attack the Uç Bazaar. Alongside Bala Hatun, she contributes to organizing resistance against these threats, emphasizing her role as both a protector and a leader within the Kayi tribe. Additionally, Malhun is protective of her son Orhan's future. She opposes his potential marriage to Holofira, a Christian woman, believing that such an alliance might not serve the interests of a rising Muslim state. Despite her reservations, Orhan's romantic endeavors form part of the season's drama

== Position ==
She administers Yenişehir trade. (Yenişehir'nin ticaret Hanımı/Chief lady of Yenisehir trade).

Devlet Ana (State Mother). As the mother of Osman's heir.

== Reception and awards ==
Malhun Hatun, one of the most important characters in the series, was a character waited by many fans for the appearance of due to her historical importance. The 46th episode, which marked her first appearance, was one of the reasons why the show was at the top that day and her character continues to attract attention. Yildiz Cagri Atiksoy won the Golden Palm Awards 2021 in the category of Best TV series Actress of 2021 for her role as Malhun Hatun. In 2023 she won Istanbul University Project Club Award for the Best Actress of the Year.

== In other media ==
Malhun has been portrayed by actress Sema Celebi in the Turkish television series Kuruluş Osmancık (1988), adapted from a novel by the same name. In the historical fiction series Kuruluş: Orhan , Malhun Hatun is being portrayed by actress Bennu Yildrimlir.

== Casting ==
At first, when the series was named Diriliş: Osman, Aslıhan Karalar, the actress who played Burçin Hatun, was thought to play the role of Malhun Hatun, but ended up doing the role of Burcin Hatun. In the series, Osman's first partner is Bala Hatun and she was played by the Turkish actress Özge Törer, this was only believed after the series' first episode was released. Before the release of season 2, Özge Yağız and Yağmur Öztürk were believed to play the role of Malhun Hatun due to the fact that they both shared videos of them taking fencing lessons. This thought was dropped after Özge Yağız took part in the TV series Sol Yanım and Yağmur Öztürk took part in the TV series Acemi Anneler. Yağmur Öztürk was still, however, rumoured to play the role at some point. The 43rd episode trailer then revealed that Funda Güray was likely to play this role, however, it turned out that she would play the role of "Aksu Hatun". It was later confirmed that Yıldız Çağrı Atiksoy would be playing the role.

== See also ==
- List of Diriliş: Ertuğrul characters
- List of Kuruluş: Osman characters
