= QMobile =

Pakistani electronics company

QMobile کیو موبائل
- Type: Private Company
- Industry: Telecommunications, Audio, Consumer Electronics
- Founded: 2009; 17 years ago
- Headquarters: Karachi, Pakistan
- Area served: Pakistan
- Products: Bar Phone, Smartphone, Tablets
- Revenue: ▲PKR 20 billion (2017)
- Subsidiaries: QBeats Music (qbeats.com.pk)
- Website: www.qmobile.com.pk

QMobile (Urdu: کیو موبائل) is a Pakistani consumer electronics marketing company which marketed Gionee smartphones in Pakistan. At its peak, it is one of the largest smartphone marketing brand in Pakistan with an estimate of one million mobile phones sold monthly. QMobile phones are assembled in Pakistan with basic parts imported from vendors in China and sold under its own brand.

== History ==
QMobile was launched in 2009. Its mobile phones were known for their low- and mid-ranged price range and were assembled with imported parts from China.

QMobile’s range of devices includes, some tablets and dozens of phones including touchscreen, QWERTY, and WiFi, all running Android OS. A windows phone named QMobile W1 was also launched in 2015. QMobile launched the first Android One smartphone in Pakistan. With the passage of time, Qmobile has lost its popularity and eventually its market share to other brands. But in August 2020, it made a return with View Max series, which gained significant popularity in Pakistan.

== Branding ==
In July 2020, QMobile appointed Ertugrul Ghazi famed Esra Bilgic as its brand ambassador for their View Max series.

== Smartphones ==
- Noir (A, I, E, J, X, M, W, Z, LT & S) series
- Bolt (A & T Series)
