= Eren Vurdem =

Turkish actor

- Born: 7 October 1988 (age 38); Konayl, Turkey
- Occupation: Actor
- Years active: 2009–present
- Spouse: none/not known

Eren Vurdem (born 7 October 1988) is a Turkish actor.

== Life and career ==
Vurdem was born in 1988 in Konya and is a graduate of the Haliç University Conservatory with a degree in theatre studies. He made his television debut in 2009 with the TV series Hesaplaşma and continued his career with supporting roles in the series İnadına Aşk, Şubat and Şefkat Tepe. His breakthrough came with his role in İnadına Aşk, where he portrayed the character of Çınar, and in Söz, where he played the role of Ateş Acar. Vurdem further rose to prominence by portraying Konur Alp in the historical drama Kuruluş: Osman. Between 2020 and 2021, he was a regular on Sadakatsiz, an adaptation of Doctor Foster.

== Filmography ==
Television series
| Year | Title | Role | Notes |
|---|---|---|---|
| 2009 | Hesaplaşma | | Supporting role |
| 2010–2012 | Şefkat Tepe | Erhan | Supporting role |
| 2012 | Şubat | Muyo | Supporting role |
| 2013 | Arka Sokaklar | Osman | Guest appearance |
| 2015–2016 | İnadına Aşk | Çınar Barutçu | Supporting role |
| 2017–2019 | Söz | Başçavuş Ateş Acar | Supporting role |
| 2019–2020 | Kuruluş: Osman | Konur Alp | Supporting role |
| 2020–2021 | Sadakatsiz | Mert Gelik | Supporting role |
| 2021 | Eşkıya Dünyaya Hükümdar Olmaz | Yakup | Supporting role |
| 2021 | Fandom | Ayaz | Supporting role |
| 2022–2023 | Ben Bu Cihana Sığmazam | Azamet | Leading role |
| 2024–2025 | Bir Gece Masalı | Selim Allame | |
| 2026 | Tuzlu Kahve | | Guest appearance |
Film
| Year | Title | Role | Notes |
| 2015 | Son Mektup | Erenköy Asker | Supporting role |
| 2016 | Yolculuk | | Supporting role |
| 2017 | Sümela'nın Şifresi 3: Cünyor Temel | Oğuzubillah | Supporting role |
| 2017 | Kurt Kapanı | Yavuz | Supporting role |
| 2019 | Ne Olur Gitme | | Leading role |
| 2020 | Türkler Geliyor: Adaletin Kılıcı | | Supporting role |
