= Yıldız Çağrı Atiksoy =

Turkish actress

- Occupation: Actress
- Years active: 2004–present
- Spouse: Berk Oktay (m. 2022)
- Children: 1

Yıldız Çağrı Atiksoy is a Turkish actress and model best known for her role as Malhun Hatun in the Turkish historical drama TV series Kuruluş: Osman.

== Personal life ==
She studied theatre for two years at the İzmir Ege Art Center and continued her education at the Müjdat Gezen Art Center. She also got lessons in cinema, technique and acting at Plato Film. She married actor Berk Oktay in September 2022. On 21 May 2024, she gave birth to their daughter Mira Milena Oktay.

== Career ==
Atiksoy started her career in 2004 with a small role in the Büyük Buluşma TV series. She played in fantasy child series "Kayıp Prenses".

Her breakthrough came in 2011 with Öyle Bir Geçer Zaman ki, in which she portrayed the character of Berrin Akarsu. Between 2014-15, she starred in the series Yedi Güzel Adam as Zehra. She played in romantic comedy "Evli ve Öfkeli". In 2017, she joined the cast of Savaşçı and played the role of Aslı Özkaynak until 2018. The following year she began starring in the TRT 1 series Şampiyon. In 2021, she joined the historical fiction series Kuruluş: Osman in the role of Malhun Hatun. She went on to win an award for Best TV Series Actress at the Golden Palm Awards 2021 for her performance.

== Filmography ==
=== Television ===
Year	Title	Role
2021–2024	Kuruluş: Osman	Malhun Hatun
2019–2020	Şampiyon	Suna
2017–2018	Savaşçı	Aslı Özkaynak
2015–2016	Evli ve Öfkeli	Mine
2014–2015	Yedi Güzel Adam	Zehra
2013	Görüş Günü Kadınları	Gülay
2010–2013	Öyle Bir Geçer Zaman ki	Berrin Akarsu Taşer
2009	Bahar Dalları	Bahar Ziyadegil
2008	Kayıp Prenses	Defne
2008	Gazi	Leyla/Aslı
2007	Yersiz Yurtsuz	Hazal Şanoğulları
2006	Ah İstanbul	Ahu
2006	Yağmurdan Sonra	Işık Karuzo
2006	Emret Komutanım	Nurse
2005	Aşk Oyunu	Gülşen/Ayşen
2004	Büyük Buluşma	Guest appearance

=== Film ===
Year	Title	Role
2026	D.I.S.C.O	Seda
2018	Baba Nerdesin Kayboldum	Oya
2008	Miras	Irem

== Awards and nominations ==
Year	Awards	Category	Work	Result	Ref.
2020	International Izmir Film Festival	Golden Artemis: Best Actress (TV Series)	Şampiyon	Nominated	
2021	Golden Palm Awards 2021	Best TV Series Actress of the Year	Kuruluş: Osman	Won	
2023	9 Altın 61 ÖDüLLERI	Best Actress of the Year	Kuruluş: Osman	Won	
