= Yiğit Uçan =

Turkish actor (born 1987)

- Born: December 11, 1987 (age 38); Istanbul, Turkey
- Occupation: Actor
- Years active: 2012–present

Yiğit Uçan is a Turkish actor best known for his roles as Boran Bey in the Turkish historical fiction series Kuruluş: Osman and as Şehzade Bayezid in the historical fiction series Muhteşem Yüzyıl: Kösem.

== Early life ==
Yiğit Uçan was born in Istanbul, Turkey, on December 11, 1987. Of Bosniak descent, he is the younger brother of actor Cem Uçan. He attended Avcılar 50. Yıl Lisesi for his high school education before studying at Anadolu University.

== Filmography ==
=== Film ===
Year	Title	Role
2012	Kurt Kanunu	
2014–2016	Filinta	Ejder
2016–2017	Muhteşem Yüzyıl: Kösem	Şehzade Bayezid
2017		
2017	Söz	Sebastian
2018–2019	Mehmetçik: Kut'ül Amare	Şamil
2019	Eşkıya Dünyaya Hükümdar Olmaz	Yavuz Sivri
2019–2025	Kuruluş: Osman	Boran Bey
2025–2026	Kuruluş: Orhan	Boran Bey
