= Arslanbek Sultanbekov =

Turkish folk musician and poet (born 1965)

Arslanbek Sultanbekov (born 23 April 1965) is a Nogai folk musician and poet.

== Biography ==
Sultanbekov was born on April 23, 1965, in the aul Erkin-Khalk, in Karachay–Cherkess Autonomous Oblast of the Soviet Union. He finished high school in 1983. Until 1985, he fulfilled his military duty in the province of Arkhangelsk.

In 1985, he graduated from music school with a specialization in classical guitar. In 1989, having created a Nogai music group, they released their first CD called Nogay Keşeler (Nogai Nights). In the same year, he achieved first place at the Bard Festival of Karachay-Cherkess Republic. In 1994, he took the title of Karachay-Cherkess Republic National Artist and "The Most Beautiful Sound of the Republic". He has composed music for the verses of 15th to 17th-century Nogai poets he studied, such as Şal-Kiyiz Tilenşi oğlu, Asan Kaygılı, Kaz-Tuvgan Süyüniş oğlu and Dosmambet Azavlı.

In 1997, in St. Petersburg, he released his second CD, Nogai El (Nogai Homeland), for which Ali Bey Asakayev made the arrangements. Also in 1997, he attended the Turkic Folk Festival in Moscow. One of Arslanbek's songs won the name of "Song Of The Festival". In 2004, Arslanbek Sultanbekov moved to Astana, capital of Kazakhstan, where he played in the Presidential Orchestra of Kazakhstan. In 2005, he won two awards in the "patriotic song composing competition" organized for the 60th anniversary of the end of World War II. In 2008, he published a CD named Aşşı Su (Bitter Water) in Kazakhstan.

Since 2018, he has been married to film director Karina Satlykova. He has a daughter named Derya.

== Discography ==
- Nogay Keşeler (1992)
- Nogay El (1998)
- Aşşı Su (2008)
- Dombıra (2016)
- Osman Bey (2020)
- Yalan Dünya
- Türkler Geliyor (2020)
- Fetih Marşı (2020)
