= Diriliş: Ertuğrul season 1 =

2014 Turkish television season

Diriliş: Ertuğrul
- Season 1
- Official poster
- Starring: Engin Altan Düzyatan; Esra Bilgiç; Serdar Gökhan; Hakan Vanlı; Serdar Deniz
- No. of episodes: 26

Release
- Original network: TRT 1
- Original release: 10 December 2014 – 17 June 2015

Season chronology
- Next → Season 2

The first season of the Turkish TV series, Diriliş: Ertuğrul, created by Mehmet Bozdağ precedes the second season of the Diriliş: Ertuğrul and the first season of the historical drama television series premiered on 10 December 2014 and concluded on 17 June 2015.

== Plot ==
Süleyman Şah, Bey of the Kayı sends his son, Ertuğrul, to ask for land from the Emir of Aleppo. This is made almost impossible when the Kayı are put in a series of problems with the Templars after saving Şehzade Numan, Halime Sultan, and Şehzade Yiğit because of the traitor in the Emir's palace, Nasir, who works for the Templars but is later killed by Ertuğrul and the truth is shown to the Emir. A brand new problem also arises with Kurdoğlu, Süleyman Şah's brother, who seeks his brother's Beylik with the help of Selcan Hatun, Ertuğrul's sister-in-law and adoptive sister, who wants revenge from Süleyman Şah as he killed her treacherous father, Alptekin Bey. Ertuğrul, who loves Halime, marries her after much difficulty. Selcan's husband, Gündoğdu becomes jealous of his brother Ertuğrul as he is respected as the tribe hero but gradually calms down. Towards the end of the season, Kurdoğlu is beheaded, Ertuğrul successfully defeats the Templars and captures their castle, and Selcan repents. This is followed by Süleyman Şah's death and the tribe's migration to Erzurum as part of Süleyman Şah's will before he died.

== Production ==
Preparations for season 1 began in February 2014. In five months, the stories and drawings were ready. Gambat from Mongolia had drawings made in three months. The teams started their work in May 2014. The decoration and art team consisted of sixty people and worked for 4 months for the first episode. 4000 square metres of fabric were used for costumes and decor. As for the choreography of the show, Nomad, the special choreography crew of movies such as The Expendables 2, 47 Ronin, and Conan the Barbarian, from Kazakhstan, was invited to Turkey. The crew prepared special choreographies for actors, horses, and other scenes. The cast took riding, sword fighting, and archery lessons for 3 months. There were 25 horses on the set, attended by a veterinarian, who specially trained them. All are maintained on a horse farm in Riva. A special area similar to a zoo (but on a smaller scale) was created for all the animals which appear in the show, which include gazelles, sheep, goats, nightingales and partridges. The shooting time of the first episode was about a month.

Season one was filmed around Beykoz and Riva in Istanbul. Diriliş: Ertuğrul set up two plateaus for Riva and Beykoz Kundura Factory for the first season. The plateau in Riva was erected on a total area of 40,000 m^{2} with 35 tents built according to the original. In the Beykoz Kundura factory, Aleppo, Aleppo Palace, supply room, guest rooms, corridors, dungeons, Karatoygar room, Seljuk pavilion, temple halls, and rooms, lodges, and tent interiors were built on a closed area of 6,000 m^{2}. In the Kundura factory, the Aleppo Bazaar, the interior of the fortress, the interior of the tent by Süleyman Şah, the dungeon, the corridor, and the altar of the temple were built on an open area of 5,000 m^{2}.

== Cast ==
Cast

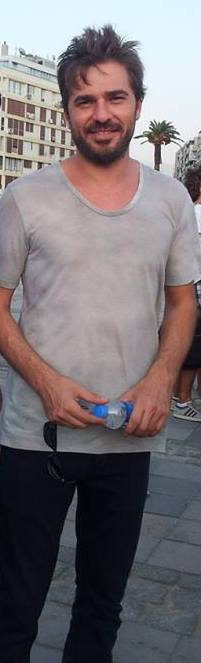
Engin Altan Düzyatan (Ertuğrul Bey)

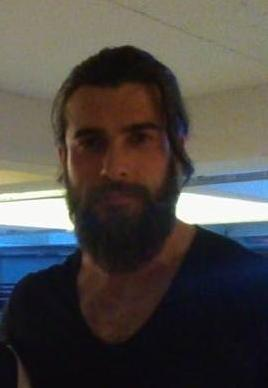
Cengiz Coşkun (Turgut Alp)

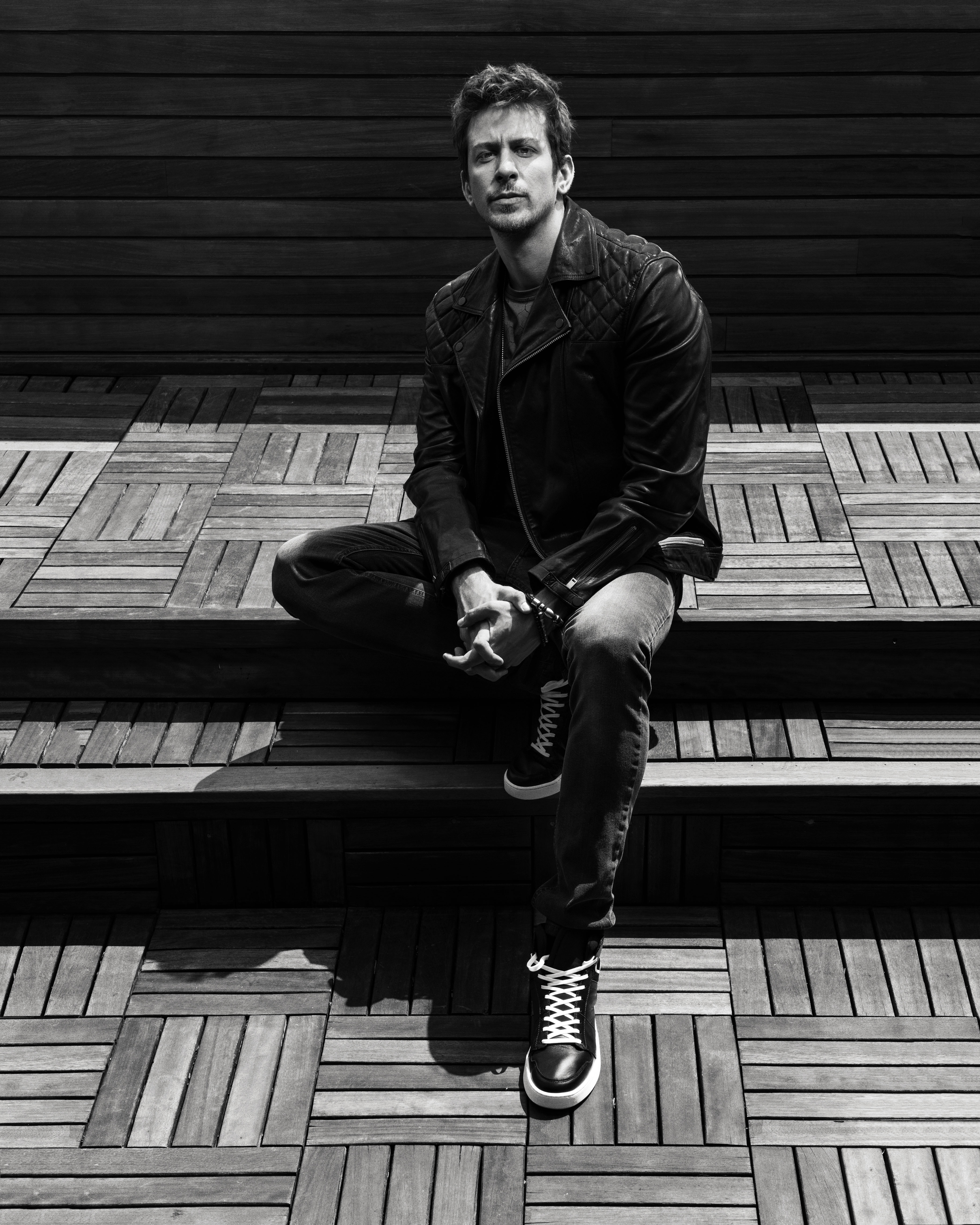
Birand Tunca (Bisol)

=== Main characters ===
- Engin Altan Düzyatan as Ertuğrul
- Hakan Vanlı as Kurdoğlu Bey
- Hülya Darcan as Hayme Ana
- Serdar Gökhan as Süleyman Şah
- Esra Bilgiç as Halime Sultan
- Serdar Deniz as Titus
- Cengiz Coşkun as Turgut Alp
- Didem Balçın as Selcan Hatun
- Kaan Taşaner as Gündoğdu Bey

=== Supporting characters ===
- Cavit Çetin Güner as Doğan Alp
- Nurettin Sönmez as Bamsı Beyrek
- Hande Subaşı as Aykız Hatun
- Burcu Kıratlı as Gökçe Hatun
- Levent Öktem Üstad-ı Azam Petruccio Manzini
- Mehmet Çevik as Deli Demir
- Ozman Sirgood as İbn-i Arabi
- Mehmet İnci as Emir El Aziz
- Arda Anarat as Dündar Bey
- Reshad Strik as Ömer Alp (formerly Claudius)

=== Minor characters ===
- Turgut Tunçalp as Afşin Bey
- Sedat Savtak as Şehzade Numan
- Burak Temiz as Şehzade Yiğit
- Can Kahraman as Kara Toygar
- Tolga Sala as Hamza Alp
- Gökhan Karacık, Derviş İshak
- Celal Al as Abdurrahman Alp
- Atilla Engin as Kardinal Thomas
- Burak Çimen as Nâsır
- Zeynep Aydemir as Eftelya
- Fahri Öztezcan as İlyas Fakıh
- Sedat Erdiş as Alpargu Bey
- Dilek Serbest as İzadora
- Gökhan Atalay as Atabey Şahabettin Tuğrul
- Hamit Demir as Akçakoca Bey
- Büşra Çubukçuoğlu as Leyla Sultan
- Ayşegül İşsever as Dadı Ümmülhayr (El Aziz's aunt)
- Özlem Aydın as Elenora
- İskender Altın as Ömer (formerly Giovanni)
- Melikşah Özen as Melikşah Alp

=== Guest characters ===
- Zafer Altun as Baybora
- Hüseyin Özay as Korkut Bey
- Kıvanç Kılıç as Aykutlu
- Birand Tunca as Bisol
- Diler Öztürk as Alptekin Bey

== Episodes ==
No. overall	No. in season	Title	Directed by	Written by	Original release date	Turkey viewers (millions)
1	1	"Pilot"	Emre Konuk	Mehmet Bozdağ and Atilla Engin	10 December 2014	5.54
The poverty-stricken Kayı search for a new home. Meanwhile, Ertuğrul saves a family of Selçuk royals from the Templars and brings them to the camp. Matters are therefore worsened for the Kayı, many of whom oppose the new arrivals. Kara Toygar threatens the Kayi camp when Suleyman Shah refuses to turn over the prisoners. Titus learns the excruciating truth about his brother. In the search for a new camp, Suleyman sends Ertugrul to Aleppo and fuels fraternal jealously. Kurdogu makes a deal with Kara Toygar.
2	2	"Av, Part 1"	Emre Konuk	Mehmet Bozdağ and Atilla Engin	17 December 2014	5.82
On the way to Aleppo, a dangerous enemy crosses paths with Ertugrul. Halime and her family come under attack. Fate hands Titus a golden chance for revenge, but the timing is not right. Selcan conspires with Gokce to boost their status in the family. A premonition saves Ertugrul's life as Titus raises the stakes against him. Ustadi Azam turns up the heat on his rivals.
3	3	"Av, Part 2"	Metin Günay	Mehmet Bozdağ, Atilla Engin, Mustafa Burak Doğu, Hale Aksu Engin and Alp Emre Oduncu	24 December 2014	5.96
Suleyman's prayers are answered, but Gundodgu's life hangs by a thread. Kurdoglu puts another plan into action. A mysterious messenger puts a damper on the Kayi tribe's festivities. Suleyman presses Halime's father about his true identity. Sensing imminent danger, Sehzade Numan asks Suleyman for a favor. Suleyman shows Kara Toygar that he has the upper hand - but not for long.
4	4	"Hain Olan"	Metin Günay	Mehmet Bozdağ, Atilla Engin, Mustafa Burak Doğu, Hale Aksu Engin, Alp Emre Oduncu and Ahmet Turgut	7 January 2015	6.13
The prisoner exchange goes awry. At the camp, Hayde stands up to Kurdoglu, who exploits another opportunity to strike against Suleyman. Kurdoglu puts his plan in motion, but Ertugrul is one step ahead of him. Selcan tries to turn the tables in her favor. Kurdoglu intervenes on behalf of Kara Toygar. Selcan's maneuvering pays off, but Gundogdu spoils everything.
5	5	"Ertuğrul"	Metin Günay	Mehmet Bozdağ, Mustafa Burak Doğu, Hale Aksu Engin, Alp Emre Oduncu and Ahmet Turgut	14 January 2015	5.93
On the way to Aleppo, Ertugrul and Halime walk into lion's den. Gundogdu and Kurdoglu have a heated face-off. Ustadi Azam is determined to eliminate anyone who stands in the way of his campaign. Suleyman's greatest threat is close by. Selcan tries to kill two birds with one stone, but her ambition becomes her downfall. With Halime in critical condition, Ertugrul's group splits up.
6	6	"Süleyman Şah"	Metin Günay	Mehmet Bozdağ, Mustafa Burak Doğu, Hale Aksu Engin, Alp Emre Oduncu and Ahmet Turgut	21 January 2015	5.60
Ustadi Azam uses Ibn Arabi to tighten the screws on Giovanni. An informant pulls the wool over Sahabettin's eyes. Sahabettin falls deeper into love's trap. The Knights Templar's lethal weapon strikes the Kayi tribe on the eve of their migration. Sahabettin is key to Ertugrul's plan, but El Aziz stands in the way. Turgut and Yigit are still missing, but Ertugrul has a more immediate problem.
7	7	"İlahi Adalet"	Metin Günay	Mehmet Bozdağ, Mustafa Burak Doğu, Hale Aksu Engin, Alp Emre Oduncu and Aslı Zeynep Peker Bozdağ	28 January 2015	5.06
After narrowly escaping a tragic fate, Ertugrul makes a radical plan as time runs out for Sahabettin. With El Aziz unwavering in his decision, Sahabettin prepares to embrace his fate, but a hooded stranger makes a surprise appearance. Izadora takes Yigit under her wing, Nasir controls El Aziz as a puppet leader and orders a thorough manhunt to finish what he started.
8	8	"Hesap Vakti"	Metin Günay	Mehmet Bozdağ, Mustafa Burak Doğu, Hale Aksu Engin, Alp Emre Oduncu and Aslı Zeynep Peker Bozdağ	4 February 2015	4.87
Ertugrul cautions Numan, who puts himself in the firing line at El Aziz's palace. A visitor gives Turgut hope. Deli Demir heads for Aleppo and cannot believe what he sees upon arrival. Ertugrul puts his life on the line to set a trap for Nasir. Titus brushes up against a sworn enemy from the past. During a confrontation with Nasir, Ertugrul faces a difficult choice.
9	9	"Büyük Rüya"	Metin Günay	Mehmet Bozdağ, Atilla Engin, Mustafa Burak Doğu, Hale Aksu Engin, Alp Emre Oduncu and Aslı Zeynep Peker Bozdağ	18 February 2015	5.71
Leyla helps Ertugrul at a critical moment, but her absence draws attention. Seeking answers about her family, Izadora makes a deal with Turgut. Ertugrul makes a narrow escape. Nasir has an elaborate plan for Halime, who struggles to make El Aziz see the truth. Aykiz takes matters into her own hands and pays Effelya a visit. Ustadi Azam goes after a mole on his own turf.
10	10	"Diriliş Vakti"	Metin Günay	Mehmet Bozdağ, Atilla Engin and Aslı Zeynep Peker Bozdağ	25 February 2015	5.61
Gundogdu and Selcan come to blows over her ambitions. Ertugrul brings pressure to bear on Effelya, but the tribe needs her alive. To infiltrate the Knights Templar's base, Ertugrul deliberately leaks information. Numan's decision deals a major blow to Halime. Ertugrul captures an important prisoner on the way. Ustadi Azam grooms Yigit for the final stage of his plan.
11	11	"Hain Kim?"	Metin Günay	Mehmet Bozdağ, Atilla Engin and Aslı Zeynep Peker Bozdağ	4 March 2015	6.44
A message arrives at the Kayi camp and Selcan decides it is time to settle accounts with Suleyman. Marcus falls for the Kayi tribe ruse. Titus wreaks havoc on the camp. A surprise visitor knocks on Afsin's door, and Numan leaves Ertugrul no choice but to walk away from Halime. As Titus's plan spirals out of control, he and Kurdoglu look for a way out. Sahabettin watches them closely.
12	12	"Gönlümüz Halep"	Metin Günay	Mehmet Bozdağ, Atilla Engin and Aslı Zeynep Peker Bozdağ	11 March 2015	5.72
The Knights Templar's position in Aleppo depends on Eftelya, who tries to turn Ertugrul against Halime. Eftelya decides her own fate. A showdown between Ertugrul and Titus gets interrupted and Ertugrul questions Kara Toygar's true motives. Nasir oversteps his bounds with El Aziz and Halime seizes her chance to appeal on behalf of the Kayi tribe.
13	13	"Bedrin Aslanları"	Metin Günay	Mehmet Bozdağ, Atilla Engin and Aslı Zeynep Peker Bozdağ	18 March 2015	5.28
In pitting herself against Selcan, Aykiz plays with fire. Ertugrul rushes to head off the diplomatic mess created by Nasir. Selcan falls out with Hayme's favor. Ertugrul walks into an important meeting and exposes a conspiracy against his tribe. El Aziz hands down harsh sentence to Layla and Nanny. Ertugrul and Gundogdu return home to a slew of shocking news.
14	14	"Gün Birlik Günü"	Metin Günay	Mehmet Bozdağ, Atilla Engin and Aslı Zeynep Peker Bozdağ	25 March 2015	5.50
News about Halime sends Ertugrual back on the road. Claudius accepts a mission that puts Ibn Arabi in harm's way. Kurdoglu tries to turn Suleyman and Gundogdu against Ertugrul, who negotiates with El Aziz at knifepoint. Ustadi Azam loses his grip on Aleppo. At the camp, public opinion is not in Suleyman's favor and Hayme cracks down on Selcan.
15	15	"Adalet Ordusu"	Metin Günay	Mehmet Bozdağ, Atilla Engin and Aslı Zeynep Peker Bozdağ	1 April 2015	5.62
Claudius' mission hits a snag. Hayme discovers the Selcan has a personal vendetta, but Gundogdu stands by Selcan. Gundogdu unwittingly becomes a part of Kurdoglu's scheme. Hayme gives Halime and Gokce a dilemma. Gundogdu squares off with Ertugrul. Selcan stirs the pot at the family meal, where an unexpected guest arrives with distressing news for Halime.
16	16	"Davamız"	Metin Günay	Mehmet Bozdağ, Atilla Engin and Aslı Zeynep Peker Bozdağ	8 April 2015	5.31
Cardinal Thomas and Titus carry out their plan with Turgut, whose decisions spell disaster for Ertugrul. Suleyman meets with the Seljuks, but Ertugurul's return throws the camp into disarray. Halime refuses the Seljuk sultan's offer. With their greatest obstacle out of the way Ustadi Azam and Kurdoglu advance on their target, but Gundogdu tests Kurdoglu's loyalty.
17	17	"Er Meydanı"	Metin Günay	Mehmet Bozdağ, Atilla Engin and Aslı Zeynep Peker Bozdağ	15 April 2015	5.30
A visitor brings news of Turgut to the Kayi camp and puts Kurdoglu in an unfavorable position. A murder plot unravels. Kurdoglu incurs Selcan's wrath. Izadora helps Suleyman connect the dots and Eftelya gets her hands on an important letter. Ertugrul and Suleyman put Kurdoglu on the stand, but Gundogdu steps in. Thomas tests Ustadi Azam's patience.
18	18	"Diriliş İçin"	Metin Günay	Mehmet Bozdağ, Atilla Engin and Aslı Zeynep Peker Bozdağ	22 April 2015	5.98
Turgut is not out of the woods yet. Selcan pulls strings to influence Gundogdu and Hayme loses control of the situation. Gokce overhears Selcan's secret plan, and Suleyman invites a contest for power that threatens to pit his sons against each other. Gokce sees Selcan's true colors and confronts her. Gundugodu plays into Kurdoglu's hands, but someone more powerful has a hidden plan.
19	19	"Beylik Zamanı"	Metin Günay	Mehmet Bozdağ, Atilla Engin and Aslı Zeynep Peker Bozdağ	29 April 2015	5.37
Selcan loses favor with Gundogdu as her ambitions get the best of her. Kurdoglu unleashes another weapon to sow chaos in the camp. While Suleyman gives him the benefit of the doubt, Kurdoglu misleads Suleyman's men. Yigit's life is in the enemy hands. After losing their only witness, Ertugrul and his men are back to square one on the hunt for the traitor, but Izadora gives them another lead.
20	20	"Büyük Oyun"	Metin Günay	Mehmet Bozdağ, Atilla Engin and Aslı Zeynep Peker Bozdağ	6 May 2015	5.76
Kurdoglu takes advantage of Ertugrul's absence. When the Knights Templar outnumber Ertugrul, his wit is the only thing that can save him. Kurdoglu tries to force Selcan's hand and makes Turgut his right-hand man. Ertugrul has valuable information that Ustadi Azam needs. Struggling to keep order among his subjects, Kurdoglu hands down Suleyman's sentence and sets a dangerous trap for him and Hayme.
21	21	"Zulüm Devam Etmez"	Metin Günay	Mehmet Bozdağ, Atilla Engin and Aslı Zeynep Peker Bozdağ	13 May 2015	6.02
Selcan repents and decides to mend fences with those she has betrayed. Ertugrul meets an unlikely ally. Ertugrul prepares to settle accounts with Kurdoglu who is suspicious of Ayhan's loyalties. The Kayi tribe's fate depends on Turgut. The Knights Templar's plan comes apart at the seems and Izadora pays a price. Claudius causes a rift between Thomas and Ustadi Azam.
22	22	"Zafer Günü, Part 1"	Metin Günay	Mehmet Bozdağ, Atilla Engin and Aslı Zeynep Peker Bozdağ	20 May 2015	6.42
A confrontation between Ertugrul and Kurdoglu ends in bloodshed. Within Ustadi Azain in grave condition, Thomas gains the upper hand. Kurdoglu's judgement day arrives, but Thomas still has one advantage over the Kayi tribe. Ibn Arabi convinces Selcan to change her ways. Titus is determined to eradicate the Kayi tribe. Claudius brings urgent news to Ertugrul who plans an offensive campaign into enemy territory.
23	23	"Zafer Günü, Part 2"	Metin Günay	Mehmet Bozdağ, Atilla Engin and Aslı Zeynep Peker Bozdağ	27 May 2015	5.51
After Deli Demir and Afsin Bey find a way to infiltrate the Knights Templar, the Kayi tribe readies for battle. Ertugrul's army catches the Knights Templar off guard. In a tight spot, Titus suspects there's an informant from within. Under Titus's watch, Omer plays a risky double game. Selcan's sudden realization changes her fate.
24	24	"Kutlu Fetih"	Metin Günay	Mehmet Bozdağ, Atilla Engin and Aslı Zeynep Peker Bozdağ	3 June 2015	5.21
Omer pays a heavy price for his betrayal. Yigit helps to lead Ertugrul and his army on the road to victory. Turgut gets his sweet revenge. Within Titus still a threat to the Kayi army. Ertugruls men set out on a manhunt. Gundogdu responds unexpectedly to Selcan's big news. At the Kayi camp, danger still lingers in the shadows.
25	25	"Milletin Dirilişi, Part 1"	Metin Günay	Mehmet Bozdağ, Atilla Engin and Aslı Zeynep Peker Bozdağ	10 June 2015	4.87
Selcan atones for her crimes and risks her life for Gundogdu, who confronts a dangerous enemy from the past. Ibn Arabi leaves Ertugrul with a valuable relic. A perilous journey lies ahead for Ertugrul and Suleyman. As Ertugrul consolidates power across Anatolia, Hayme fears that an ominous premonition may come true.
26	26	"Milletin Dirilişi, Part 2"	Metin Günay	Mehmet Bozdağ, Atilla Engin and Aslı Zeynep Peker Bozdağ	17 June 2015	4.06
As the Kayi tribe struggles with its sudden loss of Süleyman Şah, Hayme calls a meeting to form a strategy against new threats.
