= Diriliş: Ertuğrul season 2 =

2015 Turkish television season

Diriliş: Ertuğrul
- Season 2
- Official poster
- Starring: Engin Altan Düzyatan; Esra Bilgiç; Kaan Taşaner; Uğur Güneş; Barış Bağcı /> Ahmad Harhash
- No. of episodes: 35

Release
- Original network: TRT 1
- Original release: 30 September 2015 – 8 June 2016

Season chronology
- ← Previous; Season 1 Next → Season 3

The second season of the Turkish TV series, Diriliş: Ertuğrul, created by Mehmet Bozdağ succeeds the first season and precedes the third season of Diriliş: Ertuğrul. The second season of the historical drama television series premiered on 30 September 2015 and concluded on 8 June 2016.

== Plot ==
The Kayı settled in Erzerum, seek refuge with Dodurga, after the Mongols, led by Baycu Noyan, massacre half their tribe. This leads to Ertuğrul facing Tuğtekin who is jealous of him all along. Gündöğdü is misled by a threat within Dodurga; Aytolun and Gümüştekin. Ayotlun married Tuğtekin's father, Korkut Bey, so that she could help his brother, Gümüştekin become the margrave of all Turkmen tribes(Üç Bey), with the help of Emir Sadettin Köpek. After killing Korkut, only Selcan is aware of this threat and constantly tries to warn Gündöğdü, who ignores her for her misdeeds in past. Along with these schemes, Kocabaş, Tuğtekin's alp who works for Baycu Noyan, turns Tuğtekin against Ertuğrul, making their relationship worse but is later killed by Ertuğrul and his relationship with Tuğtekin gradually improves. Aytolun and Gümüştekin are killed after their treachery is caught. After killing Tuğtekin, Noyan is supposedly killed by Ertuğrul, and the tribe split between 1000 migrating to Ahlat with Gündöğdü, and 400 migrating to Western Anatolia with Ertuğrul.

== Production ==
Season 2 was based around the current events happening in the year at the time. Metin Günay, the director, said,

"All conflicts in Anatolia, Mesopotamia, Asia and the Middle East as of the 13th century, are similar to today's conflicts. As such, the audience will find today's political international conflicts in the 13th century, while watching in the news and in daily life. As of the period, there is a Mongol invasion that collapsed like a dark cloud over Anatolia."

== Reception ==
Even the season's trailers became a great hit in Turkey, with a record-breaking hit, the season teaser, trailer, and internet promotion reached more than 10 million people over the internet in three days and received close to 3 million clicks. Thousands of positive comments also came to the series via social media.

== Cast ==
Cast

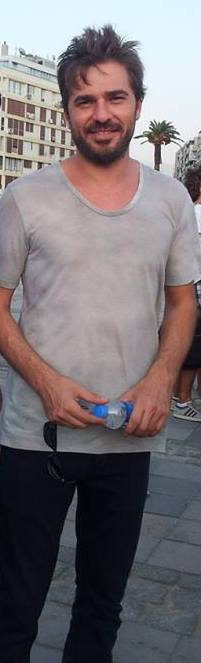
Engin Altan Düzyatan (Ertuğrul Bey)

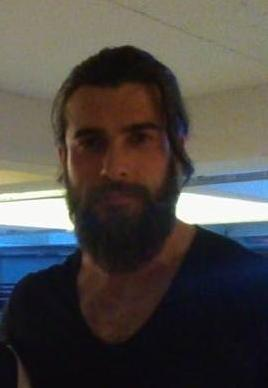
Cengiz Coşkun (Turgut Alp)

=== Main characters ===
- Engin Altan Düzyatan as Ertuğrul Bey
- Uğur Güneş as Tuğtekin Bey
- Hülya Darcan as Hayme Ana
- Esra Bilgiç as Halime Sultan
- Barış Bağcı as Baycu Noyan
- Cengiz Coşkun as Turgut Alp
- Cavit Çetin Güner as Doğan Alp
- Didem Balçın as Selcan Hatun
- Kaan Taşaner as Gündoğdu Bey

=== Supporting characters ===
- Hüseyin Özay as Korkut Bey
- Ezgi Esma as Banu Çiçek
- Nurettin Sönmez as Bamsı Beyrek
- Murat Garipağaoğlu as Sadettin Köpek
- Ayberk Pekcan as Artuk Bey
- Ozman Sirgood as İbn-i Arabi
- Celal Al as Abdurrhahman Alp
- Burcu Kıratlı as Gökçe Hatun
- Evrim Solmaz as Aytolun Hatun
- Zeynep Kızıltan as Goncagül Hatun
- Sezgin Erdemir as Sungurtekin Bey
- Mehmet Çevik as Deli Demir
- Mehmet Polat as Gümüştekin Bey

=== Minor characters ===
- Edip Zeydan as Dumrul Alp
- Gökhan Öskay as Kaya Alp
- Melih Özdoğan as Samsa Alp
- Kaptan Gürman as Geyikli
- Gökhan Karacık as Derviş İshak
- Atilla Kılıç as Boğaç Alp
- Çağlar Yiğitoğulları as Ulu Bilge Şaman
- Hakan Serim as Günkut Alp
- Melikşah Özen as Melikşah Alp
- Bogaçhan Talha Peker as Turalı Alp
- Muharrem Özcan as Tangut
- Tolga Sala as Hamza Alp
- Evren Erler as Kocabaş Alp

=== Guest characters ===
- Serdar Gökhan as Süleyman Şah
- Hande Subaşı as Aykız Hatun
- Even Sakcı as Efrasiyab
- Onur Şenay as Atabey Ertokuş
- Sedat Kalkavan as Karabek
- Arda Anarat as Dündar Bey
- Burak Temiz as Yiğit Alp

- Ahmad Harhash as Samjat Khan

== Episodes ==
No. overall	No. in season	Title	Directed by	Written by	Original release date	Turkey viewers (millions)
27	1	"Bir Karış Toprak Vermeyiz"	Metin Günay	Mehmet Bozdağ, Atilla Engin & Aslı Zeynep Peker Bozdağ	30 September 2015	5.27
The Mongols, under Noyan's command, attack the Kayı tribe. Ertuğrul is captured by Tangut, Noyan's right-hand-man, while the rest of the tribe seeks refuge in the Dodurga tribe. The Dodurga tribe is ruled by Korkut, Hayme's brother.
28	2	"Boyun Eğmeyeceğiz"	Metin Günay	Mehmet Bozdağ, Atilla Engin & Aslı Zeynep Peker Bozdağ	7 October 2015	6.01
Aykız is buried after being burnt in the Mongol attack. Gündoğdu and Korkut's son, Tuğtekin set out to find Ertuğrul, but return with the news of Ertuğrul's death. This false news turns into great pain for the Kayı tribe. When Halime heard the news of her husband's death, she was near to losing her child. Tuğtekin, the ambitious nephew of Hayme Ana, takes command of the alps of the Dodurga and the Kayı causing great troubles for all the alps. Meanwhile, Ertuğrul is tortured by Mongols and he struggles to escape from them.
29	3	"Birlik Vakti"	Metin Günay	Mehmet Bozdağ, Atilla Engin & Aslı Zeynep Peker Bozdağ	14 October 2015	6.33
The Kayı and Dodurga people ally with the Selçuk Sultan Alaeddin Keykubat. Noyan torments Ertuğrul to join his ranks. Ertuğrul refuses to do so, causing Noyan's brutal reaction by piercing his hand with a nail to make it almost impossible to hold a sword. However, Ertuğrul manages to escape by confronting Tangut and the Mongol soldiers.
30	4	"Beklenen Kahraman"	Metin Günay	Mehmet Bozdağ, Atilla Engin & Aslı Zeynep Peker Bozdağ	21 October 2015	6.81
Ertuğrul is determined to go to his tribe as soon as possible and start preparations to take measures against the Mongols. The sudden appearance of Ertuğrul with his alps creates great excitement and happiness for his lovers. It also causes a great shock for Tuğtekin and Korkut's devious wife, Aytolun, Tuğtekin's stepmother. Ertuğrul is determined to keep the head of alps duty that his father gave him. Due to this decision, he faces Korkut Bey, his mother, Gündoğdu, and, Tuğtekin, also affecting the alps of both tribes.
31	5	"Yalnız Değilsin"	Metin Günay	Mehmet Bozdağ, Atilla Engin & Aslı Zeynep Peker Bozdağ	28 October 2015	7.17
Ertuğrul fails to become the head of alps. Korkut, Hayme and Gündoğdu mourn over this decision. However, they believed that Ertuğrul just wanted revenge. The injury of Ertuğrul's hand was a factor in Hayme's decision. The removal of Ertuğrul from his duties leaves the Kayı alps in great astonishment.
32	6	"Kutlu Uyanış"	Metin Günay	Mehmet Bozdağ, Atilla Engin & Aslı Zeynep Peker Bozdağ	4 November 2015	6.74
Ertuğrul comes face to face with his mother Hayme and his brother Gündoğdu due to the strife of Aytolun, Koçabaş, the Mongol traitor, and Tuğtekin. Everyone wants to spend a peaceful and warm winter to meet their needs while Ertuğrul starts the preparations for a war against the Mongols with the help of Geyikli and his alps Doğan and Turgut.
33	7	"Diriliş Günü, Part 1"	Metin Günay	Mehmet Bozdağ, Atilla Engin & Aslı Zeynep Peker Bozdağ	11 November 2015	7.23
In order to break Ertuğrul's will to fight, both the traitors inside and the enemy Mongols outside want to keep him under pressure. Ertuğrul also confronts his mother Hayme and his elder brother Gündoğdu causing breaks and splits in the family. Ertuğrul decides to continue his struggle alone, without any hesitation despite all the negative conditions. Hamza Alp joins the Mongols, seeking revenge on Gündoğdu who blamed him for allying with them in the first place, he helps them recruit more Turk warriors. Seeing this, Abdurrahman is imprisoned with the death penalty for being a traitor in the tribe as he stayed around with Hamza.
34	8	"Diriliş Günü, Part 2"	Metin Günay	Mehmet Bozdağ, Atilla Engin & Aslı Zeynep Peker Bozdağ	18 November 2015	7.66
Neither Gündoğdu, Hayme or Ertuğrul agree to the execution of Abdurrahman, who was entrusted by Ertuğrul's father Süleyman Şah. However, Gündoğdu and Hayme suggested to dismiss him from his duties. In the meanwhile, Ertuğrul plans to free him and succeeds in rescuing Abdurrahman. Knowing this, Hayme exiles Ertuğrul from the camp to prevent any further unrest.
35	9	"Yalnız Değilsin"	Metin Günay	Mehmet Bozdağ, Atilla Engin & Aslı Zeynep Peker Bozdağ	25 November 2015	7.15
Hayme is caught between her principal obligations and her maternal feelings following the exile of Ertuğrul, she regrets that she exiled Ertuğrul with his injured hand. A Persian merchant Efrasiyab comes to the tribe to trade but is secretly working for Mongols. İbn-i Arabi appears in Ertuğrul dream and orders him to open the box he gave back in season 1. Ertuğrul sends Abdurrahman to the Mongols to spy for him.
36	10	"Diriliş Ateşi"	Metin Günay	Mehmet Bozdağ, Atilla Engin & Aslı Zeynep Peker Bozdağ	2 December 2015	8.08
Aytolun and Tuğtekin are pleased by Hayme's exile of Ertuğrul. Aytolun wants to increase her effectiveness in the camp by marrying Tuğtekin to Gökçe. Seeing all this, Selcan goes over her. Meanwhile, Goncagül, Aytolun's niece, and Ertokuş Bey from Konya come to the tribe. Ertokuş meets with Ertuğrul and tells him about his long lost brother, Sungurtekin, which Kocabaş listens to and reveals to Noyan.
37	11	"Beklenen Şafak"	Metin Günay	Mehmet Bozdağ, Atilla Engin & Aslı Zeynep Peker Bozdağ	9 December 2015	8.60
Gümüştekin, Aytolun's brother, comes from Konya with Ertuğrul's death warrant further increasing the situation. Hayme Ana and Gündoğdu realize that they have made a big mistake by not listening to Ertuğrul from the beginning. The plans of the trio, Aytolun, Gümüştekin, and Goncagül were to kill Korkut and his son to make Gümüştekin the Turkic margarve. Ertokuş is killed by Tangut.
38	12	"Milletim İçin"	Metin Günay	Mehmet Bozdağ, Atilla Engin & Aslı Zeynep Peker Bozdağ	16 December 2015	8.90
Noyan starts to destroy the two tribes from the inside through his spies. Selcan and Aytolun continue with their escalated disagreements, Tuğtekin goes to find Ertuğrul due to his death warrant.
39	13	"İhanetin Bedeli"	Metin Günay	Mehmet Bozdağ, Atilla Engin & Aslı Zeynep Peker Bozdağ	23 December 2015	9.11
Ertuğrul advises Tuğtekin to realize who the real traitor is. Not paying attention, Tuğtekin attacks Ertuğrul who fights and leaves. Meanwhile, Noyan attacks Tuğtekin, nearly kills him, and sends Koçabaş to the tribes to blame Ertuğrul for this. Ertuğrul comes to the camp and decapitates Koçabaş causing an increasingly suspicious behaviour towards him from everyone.
40	14	"Baş Koydum"	Metin Günay	Mehmet Bozdağ, Atilla Engin & Aslı Zeynep Peker Bozdağ	30 December 2015	9.20
Karabek, a Mongol spy in the Selçuks, comes to the tribe to see the death penalty of Ertuğrul. Ertuğrul is prisoned in the tribe till his punishment is decided. Halime and Deli Demir are followed by Tangut who were going to Konya to inform the Sultan about Ertuğrul. Noyan prepares his Mongols to attack the tribe.
41	15	"Allah Var Gam Yok"	Metin Günay	Mehmet Bozdağ, Atilla Engin & Aslı Zeynep Peker Bozdağ	13 January 2016	9.48
The court warrants a death penalty for Ertuğrul as revenge for Korkut's son's death. Tuğtekin is being treated by Artuk Bey, Ertuğrul's ally and the Dodurga medic, and İbn-i Arabi in Geyikli's cave. Mongols attack the tribe at night following Noyan's command.
42	16	"Hilalin Gölgesinde"	Metin Günay	Mehmet Bozdağ, Atilla Engin & Aslı Zeynep Peker Bozdağ	20 January 2016	9.86
On the execution day, Ertuğrul's three alps save him. İbn-i Arabi brings Tuğtekin to the tribe who announces the betrayal of Koçabaş, decreasing the tension in the camp. It provides an environment of peace and solidarity between the two camps that hadn't existed for a long time. Tuğtekin and Gökçe's marriage preparations begin. Ertuğrul informs Abdurrahman not to return to the Mongols through Geyikli.
43	17	"Kutlu Fetih"	Metin Günay	Mehmet Bozdağ, Atilla Engin & Aslı Zeynep Peker Bozdağ	27 January 2016	9.37
The unity and solidarity between the Kayı and the Dodurga tribes disrupt Noyan's plans. Noyan injures Abdurrahman severely for deceiving them. Meanwhile, the tribe makes preparations to attack the Mongols.
44	18	"Zaferin Şerefi"	Metin Günay	Mehmet Bozdağ, Atilla Engin & Aslı Zeynep Peker Bozdağ	3 February 2016	8.87
Ertuğrul goes to a caravanserai to meet Sungurtekin where Noyan attacks both of them. The alps of both the tribes attack the Mongols and kill all of them capturing Hamza. Meanwhile, Ertuğrul successfully brings his injured brother Sungurtekin back to the camp. Noyan kidnaps Selcan with the help of Erfrasiyab.
45	19	"Sefer Bizim Zafer Allah'ındır"	Metin Günay	Mehmet Bozdağ, Atilla Engin & Aslı Zeynep Peker Bozdağ	10 February 2016	9.24
Gümüştekin and Aytolun plan to steal the Oğuz seal from Sungurtekin to give it to Emir Saddatein Köpek. Ertuğrul goes to the Byzantine border to see the new place for the migration of his tribe with his alps. There he also fights some Byzantine soldiers.
46	20	"Hak ile Batılın Savaşı"	Metin Günay	Mehmet Bozdağ, Atilla Engin & Aslı Zeynep Peker Bozdağ	17 February 2016	9.65
Ertuğrul and his alps experience new adventures and meet new people on their journey. Sungurtekin's seal is stolen in the tent of his mother, Hayme by Goncagül. Death punishment is suggested for Hamza.
47	21	"Hakkın Sesi"	Metin Günay	Mehmet Bozdağ, Atilla Engin & Aslı Zeynep Peker Bozdağ	24 February 2016	9.31
Gündoğdu rescues Selcan and captures Noyan. Hamza is martyred by Noyan. Gündoğdu brings Noyan to the tribe to execute in front of the whole tribe aimed to give strength and courage to other Turkmen tribes. On the day of execution, Noyan is saved by Emir Saadettin. Tangut controls the command of the remaining Mongols.
48	22	"Fetih Ateşi"	Metin Günay	Mehmet Bozdağ, Atilla Engin & Aslı Zeynep Peker Bozdağ	2 March 2016	9.21
Noyan's failure to be executed creates a great disappointment in the tribe. Saadettin makes other plans with Tangut. Ertuğrul and his alps set out to return to the tribe after their long journey.
49	23	"Kirli Oyun"	Metin Günay	Mehmet Bozdağ, Atilla Engin & Aslı Zeynep Peker Bozdağ	9 March 2016	9.93
Saadetin hands over Noyan to Tangut to kill him. However, Deli Demir and Sungurtekin go after Noyan. Tangut is killed by Sungurtekin after he martyrs Deli Demir. The seal that disappeared in Hayme's tent came out of Tangut. Ertuğrul decides to settle accounts with Gümüştekin by talking to his elder brothers and Artuk Bey. Selcan tells Korkut about his first wife's death and how Aytolun killed her.
50	24	"Büyük Mücadele"	Metin Günay	Mehmet Bozdağ, Atilla Engin & Aslı Zeynep Peker Bozdağ	16 March 2016	9.67
The tension between Ertuğrul and Gümüştekin has a great impact on the camp. Aytolun and Gümüştekin decide to kill Korkut Bey, who realized their plans. Aytolun poisons him on Tuğtekin's wedding night and blames Banu Çiçek, Doğan's lover, for his death. Selcan tells Ertuğrul everything she knew and Ertuğrul orders Doğan to help Banu Çiçek escape from the prison.
51	25	"Fırsat Vermeyeceğiz"	Metin Günay	Mehmet Bozdağ, Atilla Engin & Aslı Zeynep Peker Bozdağ	23 March 2016	9.92
Tuğtekin wants to punish Banu Çiçek, who he thinks is his father's murderer, as soon as possible. Ertuğrul believes that Korkut Bey's death is caused by Gümüştekin and Aytolun without any evidence to prove it. After learning about Gümüştekin's intentions, Ertuğrul postpones the court through his mother. The abduction of Banu Çiçek by Doğan increases further tension in the camp.
52	26	"Adalet Vakti"	Metin Günay	Mehmet Bozdağ, Atilla Engin & Aslı Zeynep Peker Bozdağ	30 March 2016	9.99
Tuğtekin holds Ertuğrul responsible for the escape of Banu Çiçek. Gündoğdu is assigned to capture Doğan and Banu Çiçek. Goncagül, after seeing that Selcan met Banu Çiçek, came to the camp and told her aunt what she saw. Doğan is captured by Gündoğdu Bey. On the other hand, Sadettin gathers all Turkmen beys in the caravanserai. In this meeting, Gümüştekin is appointed as the Uç Bey of the Turkmen tribes which Ertuğrul opposes.
53	27	"Kutlu Gün"	Metin Günay	Mehmet Bozdağ, Atilla Engin & Aslı Zeynep Peker Bozdağ	6 April 2016	10.41
Banu Çiçek meets Selcan to give her the evidence. According to Ertuğrul's plan, Selcan and Banu Çiçek make Aytolun talk. Aytolun confesses to everything she did, especially the death of Duru Hanım, Korkut's first wife, and Korkut Bey himself. Tuğtekin, who was in a secret place with Ertuğrul, hears all of Aytolun's confessions. On the other hand, Gümüştekin reaches his goals and becomes the Uç Bey. He returns to the camp with great glory and everyone swears allegiance to him.
54	28	"Gaza Yolu"	Metin Günay	Mehmet Bozdağ, Atilla Engin & Aslı Zeynep Peker Bozdağ	13 April 2016	9.13
Aytolun and Goncagül set out to kill Selcan. Hayme Ana confronts Aytolun saying that she knows all that she has done. Aytolun threatens to kill Halime by kicking on Halime's womb but gets killed by an arrow shot by Abdurrahman. Goncagül escapes to Köpek. Ertuğrul brings Gümüştekin to the camp and decides to execute him. Köpek again comes to the camp and demands that the criminal be handed over to him. Ertuğrul beheads Gümüştekin's and then hands it over to him much to his anger.
55	29	"Hak Yolu"	Metin Günay	Mehmet Bozdağ, Atilla Engin & Aslı Zeynep Peker Bozdağ	20 April 2016	8.87
Winter ends and spring arrives. Ertuğrul explains the idea of migrating to the Byzantine border. But after opposition, Ertuğrul tells that he will go to the Byzantine border alone if necessary. Gündoğdu goes to Erzurum with his mother for the treatment of his arm from the physicians. Saadettin asks Noyan to capture Yiğit and Dündar, who were training in Konya.
56	30	"Adalet Oyunu"	Metin Günay	Mehmet Bozdağ, Atilla Engin & Aslı Zeynep Peker Bozdağ	27 April 2016	9.34
Noyan successfully captures Dündar and Yiğit with the information Saadettin gave him. Ertuğrul and his alps could not stop him. Gündoğdu returns from Erzurum. Noyan intrigues Yiğit to become the Sultan and take his father's revenge.
57	31	"Devletin İstikbali"	Metin Günay	Mehmet Bozdağ, Atilla Engin & Aslı Zeynep Peker Bozdağ	4 May 2016	9.06
Saadettin writes a letter to the Sultan that Şehzade Yiğit has declared himself the Sultan. Turgut is captured by Noyan and is saved by the intervention of Yiğit. Saadettin gives Dündar to Sungurtekin to win his trust. Ertuğrul, Tuğtekin and Sungurtekin raid the cave of Noyan. In the meantime, Noyan captures Gökçe.
58	32	"Bizim Yolumuz"	Metin Günay	Mehmet Bozdağ, Atilla Engin & Aslı Zeynep Peker Bozdağ	11 May 2016	9.58
Gökçe kills Goncagül. Meanwhile, Saadettin plans to trap Tuğtekin. Noyan martyrs both Gökçe and Tuğtekin.
59	33	"Devletin Bekası"	Metin Günay	Mehmet Bozdağ, Atilla Engin & Aslı Zeynep Peker Bozdağ	25 May 2016	8.93
Ertuğrul saves Yiğit. Tuğtekin and Gökçe's corpses are brought to the camp. Ertuğrul captures Noyan to take him to the Sultan and also pierces his hand with a nail.
60	34	"Kutlu Mücadele, Part 1"	Metin Günay	Mehmet Bozdağ, Atilla Engin & Aslı Zeynep Peker Bozdağ	1 June 2016	8.77
Akça Bey becomes the new head of the Dodurga with the help of Saadettin. Sungurtekin goes after Yiğit with the help of Gündoğdu. Meanwhile, Ertuğrul supposedly kills Noyan. Sungurtekin gets injured in the fight.
61	35	"Kutlu Mücadele, Part 2"	Metin Günay	Mehmet Bozdağ, Atilla Engin & Aslı Zeynep Peker Bozdağ	8 June 2016	9.00
Sungurtekin's injury further increases the tension in Kayı tribe. Gündoğdu becomes the new Bey of Kayı by giving gold coins to the Beys. Ertuğrul declares that he will migrate to the Byzantine border with some people. Köpek attacks on the migrating tribe and Yiğit gets killed.
