= Diriliş: Ertuğrul season 5 =

2018 Turkish television season

Diriliş: Ertuğrul
- Season 5
- Official poster
- Starring: Engin Altan Düzyatan; Hande Soral; Nurettin Sönmez; Ali Ersan Duru; İlker Aksum
- No. of episodes: 108

Release
- Original network: TRT 1
- Original release: 7 November 2018 – 29 May 2019

Season chronology
- ← Previous; Season 4 Next → Kuruluş: Osman season 1

The fifth season of the Turkish TV series, Diriliş: Ertuğrul, created by Mehmet Bozdağ succeeds the fourth season of Diriliş: Ertuğrul and precedes the first of Kuruluş: Osman. The fifth season of the historical drama television series premiered on 7 November 2018 and concluded on 29 May 2019.

== Plot ==
After 10 years in Söğüt, in a Mongol-controlled Selçuk state, Ertuğrul faces many Mongol commanders including Alıncak and Subutai, along with the Selçuk assassin working with the Mongols, Beybolat. Beybolat is disguised with the name, Albastı who is a brother of İlbilge hatun and he arrives following the death of his father, Umur Bey, Bey of the Umuroğlu tribe, who was sent to become the new tax collector of Söğüt. Umur Bey was killed by the disgraced Byzantine commander, Dragos, disguised as the Söğüt Zangoç (transl. bellringer), who seeks to take over the town. Beybolat, who becomes his father's successor, and Dragos, who takes control over Lefke Castle after killing the innocent Tekfur Yannis, cause many problems for Ertuğrul including Beybolat's control over Söğüt for a while. İlbilge, Beybolat's sister, is the only person in her family supporting justice. With her help, Ertuğrul, defeats and kills both Beybolat and Dragos. Following Beybolat's death, Ertuğrul faces Arikbuka, a feared Mongol spy and Alıncak's blood brother, along with the spy, Qiyat, who works for Hulagu against Berke, Ertuğrul's ally and the Han of the Golden Horde. The season ends with the death of Arikbuka and Qiyat along with Ertuğrul's marriage to İlbilge Hatun.

== Cast ==
Cast

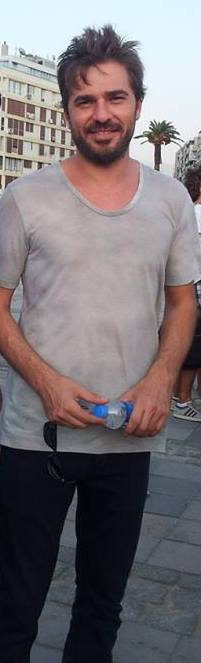
Engin Altan Düzyatan (Ertuğrul Bey)

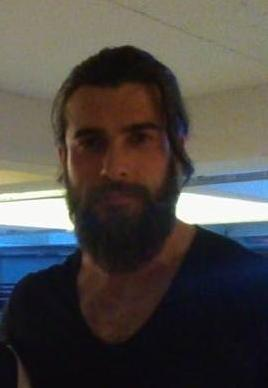
Cengiz Coşkun (Turgut Alp)

=== Main characters ===
- Engin Altan Düzyatan as Ertuğrul Bey
- Ali Ersan Duru as Beybolat Bey/Albastı
- Hülya Darcan as Hayme Ana
- Hande Soral as İlbilge Hatun
- İlker Aksum as Komutan Dragos (disguised as Zangoç)
- Cengiz Coşkun as Turgut Alp
- Nurettin Sönmez as Bamsı Beyrek

=== Supporting characters ===
- Didem Balçın as Selcan Hatun
- Kaan Taşaner as Gündoğdu Bey
- Ayberk Pekcan as Artuk Bey
- Celal Al as Abdurrahman Alp
- Engin Benli as Alıncak
- Arif Diren as Gündüz Alp
- Rümeysa Arslan as Prensesi İrene
- Emre Üçtepe as Osman Bey
- Burçin Abdullah as Hafsa Hatun
- Ali Buhara Mete as Mergen
- Uğur Karabulut as Uranos
- Öykü Çelik as Sırma Hatun
- Ali Savaşcı as Emir Bahattin
- Emre Erçil as Arikbuka

=== Minor characters ===
- Edip Zeydan as Dumrul Alp
- Hakan Serim as Günkut Alp
- Dursun Ali Erzincanlı as the Imam of Söğüt
- Kerem Bekişoğlu as Savcı Bey
- Orçun Iynemli as Mikis
- Alper Yaman as Çağrı
- Koray Şahinbaş as Tara
- Halit Özgür Sarı as Süleyman Alp
- Melikşah Özen as Melikşah Alp
- Şafak Baskaya as Yınal Alp
- Ayşun Demir as İlçin Hatun
- Esra Balıkci as Mengü Hatun
- Çağla Naz Kargı as Aslıhan Hatun (Bamsı's daughter)
- Enes Göçmen as Aybars Bey
- Armagan Oguz as Ataç Bey
- Aytek Sayan as Komutan Lais
- Enis Yıldız as Tekfur Yannis

=== Guest characters ===
- Serdar Gökhan as Süleyman Şah
- Ozman Sirgood as İbn-i Arabi (voice only)
- Ünal Silver as Umur Bey
- Mertcan Tekin as Sultan İzzeddin Keykavus
- Süleyman Karaahmet as Berke Han

== Episodes ==
No. overall	No. in season	Title	Directed by	Written by	Original release date	Turkey viewers (millions)
122	1	"Sırlar Yıllarda Burada"	Metin Günay	Mehmet Bozdağ, Atilla Engin & Aslı Zeynep Peker Bozdağ	7 November 2018	14.84
123	2	"Episode 123"	Metin Günay	Mehmet Bozdağ, Atilla Engin & Aslı Zeynep Peker Bozdağ	14 November 2018	14.71
124	3	"Episode 124"	Metin Günay	Mehmet Bozdağ, Atilla Engin & Aslı Zeynep Peker Bozdağ	21 November 2018	15.71
125	4	"Episode 125"	Metin Günay	Mehmet Bozdağ, Atilla Engin & Aslı Zeynep Peker Bozdağ	28 November 2018	14.33
126	5	"Episode 126"	Metin Günay	Mehmet Bozdağ, Atilla Engin & Aslı Zeynep Peker Bozdağ	5 December 2018	15.19
127	6	"Episode 127"	Metin Günay	Mehmet Bozdağ, Atilla Engin & Aslı Zeynep Peker Bozdağ	12 December 2018	15.33
128	7	"Episode 128"	Metin Günay	Mehmet Bozdağ, Atilla Engin & Aslı Zeynep Peker Bozdağ	19 December 2018	15.47
129	8	"Episode 129"	Metin Günay	Mehmet Bozdağ, Atilla Engin & Aslı Zeynep Peker Bozdağ	26 December 2018	15.48
130	9	"Episode 130"	Metin Günay	Mehmet Bozdağ, Atilla Engin & Aslı Zeynep Peker Bozdağ	2 January 2019	16.47
131	10	"Episode 131"	Metin Günay	Mehmet Bozdağ, Atilla Engin & Aslı Zeynep Peker Bozdağ	16 January 2019	16.44
132	11	"Episode 132"	Metin Günay	Mehmet Bozdağ, Atilla Engin & Aslı Zeynep Peker Bozdağ	23 January 2019	14.83
133	12	"Episode 133"	Metin Günay	Mehmet Bozdağ, Atilla Engin & Aslı Zeynep Peker Bozdağ	30 January 2019	15.27
134	13	"Episode 134"	Metin Günay	Mehmet Bozdağ, Atilla Engin & Aslı Zeynep Peker Bozdağ	6 February 2019	14.95
135	14	"Episode 135"	Metin Günay	Mehmet Bozdağ, Atilla Engin & Aslı Zeynep Peker Bozdağ	13 February 2019	15.73
136	15	"Episode 136"	Metin Günay	Mehmet Bozdağ, Atilla Engin & Aslı Zeynep Peker Bozdağ	20 February 2019	15.32
137	16	"Episode 137"	Metin Günay	Mehmet Bozdağ, Atilla Engin & Aslı Zeynep Peker Bozdağ	27 February 2019	16.02
138	17	"Episode 138"	Metin Günay	Mehmet Bozdağ, Atilla Engin & Aslı Zeynep Peker Bozdağ	6 March 2019	15.85
139	18	"Episode 139"	Metin Günay	Mehmet Bozdağ, Atilla Engin & Aslı Zeynep Peker Bozdağ	13 March 2019	15.18
140	19	"Episode 140"	Metin Günay	Mehmet Bozdağ, Atilla Engin & Aslı Zeynep Peker Bozdağ	20 March 2019	15.49
141	20	"Episode 141"	Metin Günay	Mehmet Bozdağ, Atilla Engin & Aslı Zeynep Peker Bozdağ	27 March 2019	14.67
142	21	"Episode 142"	Metin Günay	Mehmet Bozdağ, Atilla Engin & Aslı Zeynep Peker Bozdağ	3 April 2019	15.31
143	22	"Episode 143"	Metin Günay	Mehmet Bozdağ, Atilla Engin & Aslı Zeynep Peker Bozdağ	10 April 2019	15.20
144	23	"Episode 144"	Metin Günay	Mehmet Bozdağ, Atilla Engin & Aslı Zeynep Peker Bozdağ	17 April 2019	15.36
145	24	"Episode 145"	Metin Günay	Mehmet Bozdağ, Atilla Engin & Aslı Zeynep Peker Bozdağ	24 April 2019	14.55
146	25	"Episode 146"	Metin Günay	Mehmet Bozdağ, Atilla Engin & Aslı Zeynep Peker Bozdağ	1 May 2019	14.20
147	26	"Episode 147"	Metin Günay	Mehmet Bozdağ, Atilla Engin & Aslı Zeynep Peker Bozdağ	8 May 2019	13.92
148	27	"Episode 148"	Metin Günay	Mehmet Bozdağ, Atilla Engin & Aslı Zeynep Peker Bozdağ	15 May 2019	11.68
149	28	"Episode 149"	Metin Günay	Mehmet Bozdağ, Atilla Engin & Aslı Zeynep Peker Bozdağ	22 May 2019	11.87
150	29	"Diriliş"	Metin Günay	Mehmet Bozdağ, Atilla Engin & Aslı Zeynep Peker Bozdağ	29 May 2019	11.44
