= Diriliş: Ertuğrul season 3 =

2016 Turkish television season

Diriliş: Ertuğrul
- Season 3
- Official poster
- Starring: Engin Altan Düzyatan; Esra Bilgiç; Cem Uçan; Kürşat Alnıaçık; Çağdaş Onur Öztürk
- No. of episodes: 30

Release
- Original network: TRT 1
- Original release: 26 October 2016 – 14 June 2017

Season chronology
- ← Previous; Season 2 Next → Season 4

The third season of the Turkish TV series, Diriliş: Ertuğrul, created by Mehmet Bozdağ succeeds the second season and precedes the fourth season of Diriliş: Ertuğrul. The third season of the historical drama television series premiered on 26 October 2016 and concluded on 14 June 2017. Season 3, and consequently season 4, were the only two seasons to be filmed in Nevşehir rather than Riva.

== Plot ==
The poor Kayı newcomers face Ural of the rich Çavdar trade-veterans. Although Ural isn't the Bey of his tribe, he seeks more and more power, becoming jealous of the Kayı whenever something good happens. Meanwhile, the Templars who have infiltrated Hanlı Pazar, led by Hancı Simon, seek to kill Ertuğrul as he did to the Templars years back. Ertuğrul defeats Hancı Simon and conquers Hanlı Pazar, leaving Ural more jealous than ever. When Ural is accused of killing the Tekfur of Karacahisar, Andros, and causing problems for the Kayı, Ural is sentenced to death, however, he is saved by the devious Emir Saadettin. After the death of Candar, the Çavdar Bey, and Ural's father, Ural seeks help from the new Tekfur of Karacahisar, Vasilius, who lays an ambush for Doğan and Dündar which results in Doğan Alp being martyred and Dündar being seriously injured. Ural is later killed by Ertuğrul in an attempt to become the Bey of the Çavdar. When Vasilius attempts to ambush the Selçuk Sultan, he fails and is killed by Ertuğrul. Because of this, the Sultan makes Ertuğrul the Uç Bey angering Emir Saadettin who vows to end Ertuğrul. At the end of the season, Ertuğrul falls into an ambush set by the new Tekfur of Karacahisar, Ares.

== Cast ==
Cast

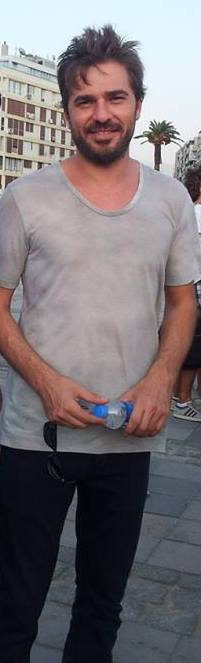
Engin Altan Düzyatan (Ertuğrul Bey)

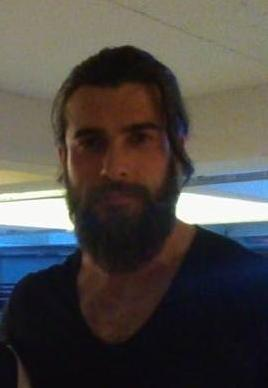
Cengiz Coşkun (Turgut Alp)

ayesha Hussain

=== Main characters ===
- Engin Altan Düzyatan as Ertuğrul Bey
- Hülya Darcan as Hayme Ana
- Esra Bilgiç as Halime Hatun
- Cengiz Coşkun as Turgut Alp
- Nurettin Sönmez as Bamsı Beyrek
- Kürşat Alnıaçık as Ural Bey
- Çağdaş Onur Öztürk as Tekfur Vasilius
- Cem Uçan as Aliyar Bey

=== Supporting characters ===
- Gülçin Santırcıoğlu as Çolpan Hatun/ Ekaterina
- Cavit Çetin Güner as Doğan Alp
- Burçin Abdullah as Hafsa Hatun (formerly Helena)
- Gülsim Ali as Aslıhan Hatun
- Ayberk Pekcan as Artuk Bey
- Ozman Sirgood as İbn-i Arabi
- Lebip Gökhan as Hancı Simon
- Erden Alkan as Candar Bey
- Murat Garipağaoğlu as Sadettin Köpek
- Ezgi Esma as Banu Çiçek
- Batuhan Karacakaya as Dündar Bey

=== Minor characters ===
- Gökhan Karacık as Derviş İshak
- Osman Albayrak as Batuhan Alp
- Celal Al as Abdurrahman Alp
- Edip Zeydan as Dumrul Alp
- Gökhan Öskay as Kaya Alp
- Melikşah Özen as Melikşah Alp
- Gökhan Bekletenler as Haçaturyan Usta
- Melih Özdoğan as Samsa Alp
- Hakan Serim as Günkut Alp
- Sedef Şahin as Maria
- Elif Sümbül Sert as Amanda
- Cenk Kangöz as Philip
- Fırat Topkorur as Petrus (disguised as Tüccar Hasan)
- Yaman Tümen as Gündüz Alp
- Mehmet Pala as Kutluca Alp
- Renan Karagözoğlu as Acar Bey
- Nazlı Yanılmaz as Günyelı Hatun

=== Guest characters ===
- Hande Subaşı as Aykız Hatun
- Serhat Barış as Tristan
- Mert Soyyer as Aleko
- Gökmen Kasabalı as Francisco
- Burak Hakkı as Sultan Alaeddin Keykubat (disguised as Ebu Mansur)
- Cemal Hünal as Tekfur Ares
- Demir Parscan as Toktamış Bey
- Ozan Gözel as Laskaris
- Janbi Ceylan as Teo

== Episodes ==
No. overall	No. in season	Title	Directed by	Written by	Original release date	Turkey viewers (millions)
62	1	"Bir Milletin Dirilişi (Note: transl. "Resurrection of a Nation")"	Metin Günay	Mehmet Bozdağ, Atilla Engin & Aslı Zeynep Peker Bozdağ	26 October 2016	11.19
63	2	"Fetih Vaktidir (Note: transl. "Time for Conquest")"	Metin Günay	Mehmet Bozdağ, Atilla Engin & Aslı Zeynep Peker Bozdağ	2 November 2016	9.59
64	3	"Hakikatin Pesinde, Part 1 (Note: transl. "In Pursuit of the Truth, Part 1")"	Metin Günay	Mehmet Bozdağ, Atilla Engin & Aslı Zeynep Peker Bozdağ	9 November 2016	10.12
65	4	"Hakikatin Pesinde, Part 2 (Note: transl. "In Pursuit of the Truth, Part 2")"	Metin Günay	Mehmet Bozdağ, Atilla Engin & Aslı Zeynep Peker Bozdağ	16 November 2016	11.42
66	5	"Diriliş Ruhu (Note: transl. "The Soul of Resurrection")"	Metin Günay	Mehmet Bozdağ, Atilla Engin & Aslı Zeynep Peker Bozdağ	23 November 2016	10.83
67	6	"Birlik Zamanı (Note: transl. "Time for Unity")"	Metin Günay	Mehmet Bozdağ, Atilla Engin & Aslı Zeynep Peker Bozdağ	30 November 2016	11.68
68	7	"Kutlu Dava (Note: transl. "A Blessed Cause")"	Metin Günay	Mehmet Bozdağ, Atilla Engin & Aslı Zeynep Peker Bozdağ	7 December 2016	11.69
69	8	"İntikam Günü (Note: transl. "The Day of Vengeance")"	Metin Günay	Mehmet Bozdağ, Atilla Engin & Aslı Zeynep Peker Bozdağ	14 December 2016	13.71
70	9	"Kutlu Zafer (Note: transl. "A Blessed Victory")"	Metin Günay	Mehmet Bozdağ, Atilla Engin & Aslı Zeynep Peker Bozdağ	21 December 2016	13.17
71	10	"Fetih Içın (Note: transl. "For Conquest")"	Metin Günay	Mehmet Bozdağ, Atilla Engin & Aslı Zeynep Peker Bozdağ	28 December 2016	12.62
72	11	"Beyimizin Yolunda (Note: transl. "On our Bey's Path")"	Metin Günay	Mehmet Bozdağ, Atilla Engin & Aslı Zeynep Peker Bozdağ	11 January 2017	12.9
73	12	"Bir Ölür Bin Diriliriz (Note: transl. "If One Dies, a Thousand Will Rise")"	Metin Günay	Mehmet Bozdağ, Atilla Engin & Aslı Zeynep Peker Bozdağ	18 January 2017	13.21
74	13	"Zafere Doğru (Note: transl. "A Proper Victory")"	Metin Günay	Mehmet Bozdağ, Atilla Engin & Aslı Zeynep Peker Bozdağ	25 January 2017	12.42
75	14	"Hesap Günü (Note: transl. "Day of Reckoning")"	Metin Günay	Mehmet Bozdağ, Atilla Engin & Aslı Zeynep Peker Bozdağ	1 February 2017	12.61
76	15	"İlahi Adalet (Note: transl. "Divine Justice")"	Metin Günay	Mehmet Bozdağ, Atilla Engin & Aslı Zeynep Peker Bozdağ	8 February 2017	12.45
77	16	"Adalet Tecelli Edecek (Note: transl. "Justice will be Served")"	Metin Günay	Mehmet Bozdağ, Atilla Engin & Aslı Zeynep Peker Bozdağ	15 February 2017	12.88
78	17	"Davamız Bir (Note: transl. "Our Cause is One")"	Metin Günay	Mehmet Bozdağ, Atilla Engin & Aslı Zeynep Peker Bozdağ	22 February 2017	12.9
79	18	"Kimiz Biz (Note: transl. "Who We Are")"	Metin Günay	Mehmet Bozdağ, Atilla Engin & Aslı Zeynep Peker Bozdağ	8 March 2017	12.53
80	19	"Yemin Ettik (Note: transl. "We Swore an Oath")"	Metin Günay	Mehmet Bozdağ, Atilla Engin & Aslı Zeynep Peker Bozdağ	15 March 2017	13.42
81	20	"Gayemiz (Note: transl. "Our Aim")"	Metin Günay	Mehmet Bozdağ, Atilla Engin & Aslı Zeynep Peker Bozdağ	22 March 2017	13.27
82	21	"Birlikte Yürümek (Note: transl. "We Walk United")"	Metin Günay	Mehmet Bozdağ, Atilla Engin & Aslı Zeynep Peker Bozdağ	29 March 2017	12.86
83	22	"Zalimler İçin Yaşasın Cehennem (Note: transl. "Long Live Hell for Tyrants")"	Metin Günay	Mehmet Bozdağ, Atilla Engin & Aslı Zeynep Peker Bozdağ	5 April 2017	14.12
84	23	"İyi (Note: transl. "Good")"	Metin Günay	Mehmet Bozdağ, Atilla Engin & Aslı Zeynep Peker Bozdağ	12 April 2017	13.87
85	24	"Kötü (Note: transl. "Bad")"	Metin Günay	Mehmet Bozdağ, Atilla Engin & Aslı Zeynep Peker Bozdağ	19 April 2017	14.38
86	25	"Allah İyiliği Destekler (Note: transl. "Allah gives goodness")"	Metin Günay	Mehmet Bozdağ, Atilla Engin & Aslı Zeynep Peker Bozdağ	3 May 2017	13.81
87	26	"Vasilius"	Metin Günay	Mehmet Bozdağ, Atilla Engin & Aslı Zeynep Peker Bozdağ	10 May 2017	11.03
88	27	"Daha Yüksek, Part 1 (Note: transl. "Even Higher, Part 1")"	Metin Günay	Mehmet Bozdağ, Atilla Engin & Aslı Zeynep Peker Bozdağ	17 May 2017	12.13
89	28	"Daha Yüksek, Part 2 (Note: transl. "Even Higher, Part 2")"	Metin Günay	Mehmet Bozdağ, Atilla Engin & Aslı Zeynep Peker Bozdağ	31 May 2017	10.85
90	29	"Bir Köpek Bir Köpektir (Note: transl. "A 'Köpek' (transl. 'dog') is a 'Köpek' ")"	Metin Günay	Mehmet Bozdağ, Atilla Engin & Aslı Zeynep Peker Bozdağ	7 June 2017	10.31
91	30	"Mutluluktan Sonra Umutsuzluk (Note: transl. "After Happiness, Despair")"	Metin Günay	Mehmet Bozdağ, Atilla Engin & Aslı Zeynep Peker Bozdağ	14 June 2017	9.6
