= Diriliş: Ertuğrul season 4 =

2017 Turkish television season

Diriliş: Ertuğrul
- Season 4
- Official poster
- Starring: Engin Altan Düzyatan; Esra Bilgiç; Cengiz Coşkun; Murat Garipağaoğlu; Cemal Hünal
- No. of episodes: 30

Release
- Original network: TRT 1
- Original release: 25 October 2017 – 6 June 2018

Season chronology
- ← Previous; Season 3 Next → Season 5

The fourth season of the Turkish TV series, Diriliş: Ertuğrul, created by Mehmet Bozdağ, succeeds the third season and precedes the fifth and final season of Diriliş: Ertuğrul. The fourth season of the historical drama television series premiered on 25 October 2017 and concluded on 6 June 2018.

== Plot ==
It is believed that Ertuğrul is dead despite the truth being that he is actually captured by some slave traders. Meanwhile, Emir Sadettin convinces Dündar, Ertuğrul's brother and the new Kayı Bey, into selling Hanlı Pazar and moving back to Gündoğdu's tribe but is stopped upon Ertuğrul's return and is forthwith banished. After Ertuğrul's son, Gündüz, is kidnapped, Ertuğrul declares war against Karacahisar and is successful in conquering it. Following Ares' capture, Ertuğrul takes him to the Sultan and tells him to confess to the Sultan about Sadettin Köpek's misdeeds. The plan nearly works but Köpek is saved by the Sultan's wife, Mahperi Hatun and leads to an event turning Tekfur Ares, later killed by Noyan, into a Muslim. Soon after that, the Sultan is killed and Köpek's increase in power in the palace creates problems for the new Sultan, Gıyaseddin. Gıyaseddin allies with Ertuğrul and with the help of Hüsamettin Karaca, Köpek is beheaded. After this, Ertuğrul faces the return of Noyan but is successful in defeating him and his devious sister, Alangoya, who attempted to kill Ertuğrul's son, Osman, who was born on the same day as his mother's death. Noyan prepares for a battle, historically known as the Battle of Köse Dağ and the Kayı move to Söğüt.

== Cast ==
Cast

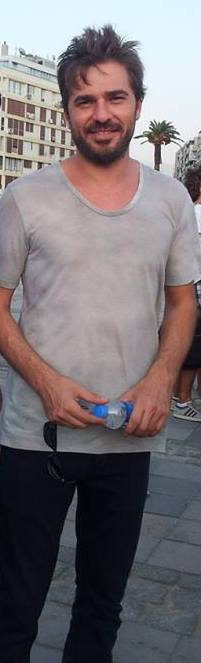
Engin Altan Düzyatan (Ertuğrul Bey)

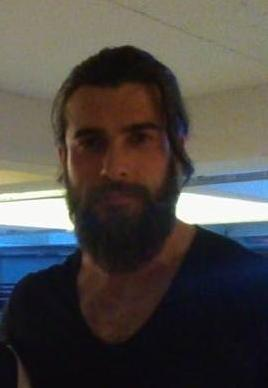
Cengiz Coşkun (Turgut Alp)

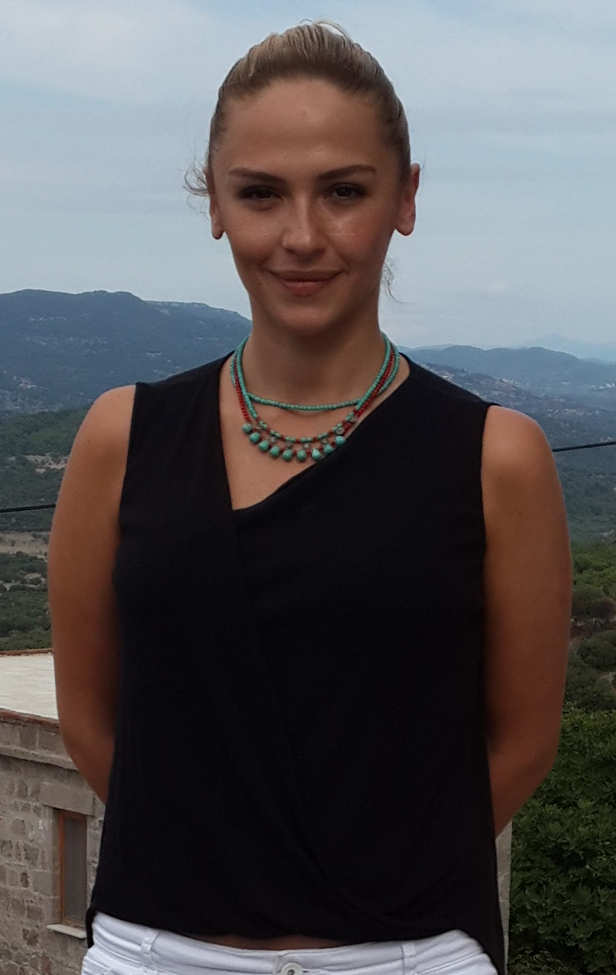
Sinem Öztürk (Mahperi Hatun)

=== Main characters ===
- Engin Altan Düzyatan as Ertuğrul Bey
- Hülya Darcan as Hayme Ana
- Esra Bilgiç as Halime Hatun
- Cengiz Coşkun as Turgut Alp
- Nurettin Sönmez as Bamsı Beyrek
- Murat Garipağaoğlu as Sadettin Köpek
- Burak Dakak as Sultan Gıyaseddin Keyhüsrev
- Cemal Hünal as Tekfur Ares / Ahmet Alp

=== Supporting characters ===
- Gülsim Ali as Aslıhan Hatun
- Burçin Abdullah as Hafsa Hatun
- Ayberk Pekcan as Artuk Bey
- Ozman Sirgood as İbn-i Arabi
- Burak Hakkı as Sultan Alaeddin Keykubat
- Engin Öztürk as Günalp Bey
- Ertuğrul Postoğlu as Bahadır Bey
- Ogün Kaptanoğlu as Titan
- Sinem Öztürk as Mahperi Hatun
- Barış Bağcı as Baycu Noyan
- Sezgin Erdemir as Sungurtekin Bey
- Batuhan Karacakaya as Dündar Bey

=== Minor characters ===
- Sera Tokdemir as Marya
- Melih Özdoğan as Samsa Alp
- Celal Al as Abdurrhahman Alp
- Edip Zeydan as Dumrul Alp
- Hasan Küçükçetin as Atabey Şemseddin Altun Aba
- Orhan Kılıç as Atsiz Bey
- Arda Öziri as Göktug
- Ergun Taş as Aziz
- Hakan Serim as Günkut Alp
- Yaman Tümen as Gündüz Alp
- Hakan Bozyiğit as Komutan Kostas
- Aslıhan Güner as Karaca Hatun
- Gürbey İleri as Sancar Bey
- Beyzanur Mete as Alçiçek Hatun
- Hakan Onat as Komutan Angelos
- Melikşah Özen as Melikşah Alp

=== Guest characters ===
- Serdar Gökhan as Süleyman Şah
- Gönül Nagiyeva as Alangoya (spies under the name Almıla Hatun)
- Burak Demir as Hüsamettin Karaca
- Oya Unustası as Sügay Hatun
- Ali Bühara Mete as Mergen (disguised as Eynece)
- Hasan Şahintürk as Tekfur Kritos
- Mert Soyyer as Aleko
- Levent Sülün as Simko
- Alper Atak as Antheus
- Merve Kızıl as Esma Hatun
- Sezanur Sözer as Eftalya
- Kaan Çakır as Ögedei Han

== Episodes ==
| No. overall | No. in season | Title | Directed by | Written by | Original release date | Turkey viewers (millions) |
|---|---|---|---|---|---|---|
| 92 | 1 | "Yalancı (Note: transl. "Liar")" | Metin Günay | Mehmet Bozdağ, Atilla Engin & Aslı Zeynep Peker Bozdağ | 25 October 2017 | 13.04 |
Ertugrul bey is seen as died by the kayi but he is saved by a slave trader who plans to sell him to tekfur Ares
| 93 | 2 | "Köleler (Note: transl. "Slaves")" | Metin Günay | Mehmet Bozdağ, Atilla Engin & Aslı Zeynep Peker Bozdağ | 1 November 2017 | 12.98 |
| 94 | 3 | "Beceriksiz Bey (Note: transl. "Incompetent Bey")" | Metin Günay | Mehmet Bozdağ, Atilla Engin & Aslı Zeynep Peker Bozdağ | 8 November 2017 | 13.66 |
| 95 | 4 | "Diriliş Ertuğrul Vakti (Note: transl. "Time for Diriliş: Ertuğrul")" | Metin Günay | Mehmet Bozdağ, Atilla Engin & Aslı Zeynep Peker Bozdağ | 15 November 2017 | 14.68 |
| 96 | 5 | "Hayatta olduğu İçin Sevin (Note: transl. "Rejoice Because He Is Alive")" | Metin Günay | Mehmet Bozdağ, Atilla Engin & Aslı Zeynep Peker Bozdağ | 22 November 2017 | 16.4 |
| 97 | 6 | "Titan" | Metin Günay | Mehmet Bozdağ, Atilla Engin & Aslı Zeynep Peker Bozdağ | 29 November 2017 | 14.79 |
| 98 | 7 | "Evlilik (Note: transl. "Marriage")" | Metin Günay | Mehmet Bozdağ, Atilla Engin & Aslı Zeynep Peker Bozdağ | 6 December 2017 | 16.52 |
| 99 | 8 | "Ödlek (Note: transl. "Coward")" | Metin Günay | Mehmet Bozdağ, Atilla Engin & Aslı Zeynep Peker Bozdağ | 20 December 2017 | 16.69 |
| 100 | 9 | "Müzakere (Note: transl. "Discussion")" | Metin Günay | Mehmet Bozdağ, Atilla Engin & Aslı Zeynep Peker Bozdağ | 27 December 2017 | 16.73 |
| 101 | 10 | "İyi Kötü ve Bahadır (Note: transl. "Good, Bad and Bahadır")" | Metin Günay | Mehmet Bozdağ, Atilla Engin & Aslı Zeynep Peker Bozdağ | 10 January 2018 | 16.03 |
| 102 | 11 | "Yeni Bir Hainin Sonu (Note: transl. "The End of Another Traitor")" | Metin Günay | Mehmet Bozdağ, Atilla Engin & Aslı Zeynep Peker Bozdağ | 17 January 2018 | 17 |
| 103 | 12 | "Büyük Zafer (Note: transl. "Great Victory")" | Metin Günay | Mehmet Bozdağ, Atilla Engin & Aslı Zeynep Peker Bozdağ | 24 January 2018 | 16.38 |
| 104 | 13 | "Allah'ın Kanunları, Allah'ın Adaleti (Note: transl. "Allah's Laws, Allah's Justice")" | Metin Günay | Mehmet Bozdağ, Atilla Engin & Aslı Zeynep Peker Bozdağ | 31 January 2018 | 14.94 |
| 105 | 14 | "Yeni Sorun (Note: transl. "A New Problem")" | Metin Günay | Mehmet Bozdağ, Atilla Engin & Aslı Zeynep Peker Bozdağ | 7 February 2018 | 14.62 |
| 106 | 15 | "Zalim Köpek (Note: transl. "Cruel Köpek")" | Metin Günay | Mehmet Bozdağ, Atilla Engin & Aslı Zeynep Peker Bozdağ | 14 February 2018 | 14.69 |
| 107 | 16 | "Ares ve Saadettin (Note: transl. "Ares and Sadettin")" | Metin Günay | Mehmet Bozdağ, Atilla Engin & Aslı Zeynep Peker Bozdağ | 21 February 2018 | 14.47 |
| 108 | 17 | "Ahmet, Ares Değil (Note: transl. "Ahmet, not Ares")" | Metin Günay | Mehmet Bozdağ, Atilla Engin & Aslı Zeynep Peker Bozdağ | 28 February 2018 | 15.13 |
| 109 | 18 | "Zalim İçin Güzel Bir Gün (Note: transl. "A Great Day for the Cruel")" | Metin Günay | Mehmet Bozdağ, Atilla Engin & Aslı Zeynep Peker Bozdağ | 7 March 2018 | 15.61 |
| 110 | 19 | "Saray Kahramanı (Note: transl. "The Hero of the Palace")" | Metin Günay | Mehmet Bozdağ, Atilla Engin & Aslı Zeynep Peker Bozdağ | 14 March 2018 | 15.06 |
| 111 | 20 | "Hata (Note: transl. "Mistake")" | Metin Günay | Mehmet Bozdağ, Atilla Engin & Aslı Zeynep Peker Bozdağ | 21 March 2018 | 14.81 |
| 112 | 21 | "Bir Şey Yanlış (Note: transl. "Something is Wrong")" | Metin Günay | Mehmet Bozdağ, Atilla Engin & Aslı Zeynep Peker Bozdağ | 28 March 2018 | 13.9 |
| 113 | 22 | "Ah Aslıhan Ah" | Metin Günay | Mehmet Bozdağ, Atilla Engin & Aslı Zeynep Peker Bozdağ | 4 April 2018 | 14.66 |
| 114 | 23 | "İyi Hainler (Note: transl. "Good Traitors")" | Metin Günay | Mehmet Bozdağ, Atilla Engin & Aslı Zeynep Peker Bozdağ | 11 April 2018 | 14.6 |
| 115 | 24 | "Köpeğin Sonu (Note: transl. "The End of Köpek")" | Metin Günay | Mehmet Bozdağ, Atilla Engin & Aslı Zeynep Peker Bozdağ | 18 April 2018 | 14.99 |
| 116 | 25 | "Halime oğlu Osman (Note: transl. "Halime's son Osman")" | Metin Günay | Mehmet Bozdağ, Atilla Engin & Aslı Zeynep Peker Bozdağ | 2 May 2018 | 12.62 |
| 117 | 26 | "Yeni Sorun (Note: transl. "A New Problem")" | Metin Günay | Mehmet Bozdağ, Atilla Engin & Aslı Zeynep Peker Bozdağ | 9 May 2018 | 13.11 |
| 118 | 27 | "Moğollar (Note: transl. "Mongols")" | Metin Günay | Mehmet Bozdağ, Atilla Engin & Aslı Zeynep Peker Bozdağ | 16 February 2018 | 10.77 |
| 119 | 28 | "Süt Anne (Note: transl. "Milk Mother")" | Metin Günay | Mehmet Bozdağ, Atilla Engin & Aslı Zeynep Peker Bozdağ | 23 May 2018 | 9.97 |
| 120 | 29 | "Barış Konuşmaları (Note: transl. "Peace Talks")" | Metin Günay | Mehmet Bozdağ, Atilla Engin & Aslı Zeynep Peker Bozdağ | 30 May 2018 | 10.51 |
| 121 | 30 | "Anadolu Planları (Note: transl. "Anatolian Plans")" | Metin Günay | Mehmet Bozdağ, Atilla Engin & Aslı Zeynep Peker Bozdağ | 6 June 2018 | 9.69 |
