= Diriliş: Ertuğrul =

2014 Turkish television series

- Also known as: Ertugrul Ghazi; Resurrection: Ertuğrul
- Genre: Historical; Adventure; Action; Islamic
- Created by: Mehmet Bozdağ
- Based on: Ertuğrul
- Directed by: Metin Günay
- Starring: Engin Altan Düzyatan; Esra Bilgiç; Kaan Taşaner; Hülya Darcan; Didem Balçın; Cengiz Coşkun; Nurettin Sönmez; Hande Soral
- Composers: Zeynep Alasya; Alpay Göltekin
- Country of origin: Turkey
- Original language: Turkish
- No. of seasons: 5
- No. of episodes: 150 (448 on Netflix) (470 on PTV Home) (list of episodes)

Production
- Executive producer: Kemal Tekden
- Production locations: Riva, Istanbul, Turkey
- Running time: 105–165 minutes; (Netflix 42–44 minutes; PTV Home 45–47 minutes)
- Production company: Tekden Film

Original release
- Network: TRT 1
- Release: 10 December 2014 – 29 May 2019

Related
- Kuruluş: Osman; Kuruluş: Orhan

Diriliş: Ertuğrul, translated as Resurrection: Ertuğrul, is a Turkish historical drama television series inspired by the life of Ertuğrul Bey, the father of Osman I, founder of the Ottoman Empire. Created and produced by Mehmet Bozdağ under Bozdağ Films, the series originally aired on TRT 1 from 2014 to 2019. It portrays Ertuğrul’s leadership of the Kayı tribe amid political conflicts, warfare, and shifting alliances in 13th-century Anatolia. The series is the first installment in Bozdağ Film’s Ottoman saga, which continues with Kuruluş: Osman and Kuruluş: Orhan.

The series was filmed in Riva, a village in the Beykoz district of Istanbul, Turkey, and premiered on TRT 1 in Turkey on 10 December 2014. The show aired for five seasons until 29 May 2019. It was written by Mehmet Bozdağ and directed by Metin Günay.

Netflix streamed the show internationally from 2016-17 through 2023.

The show has been well received in Turkey and other countries such as Pakistan and Azerbaijan, although several countries in the Arab world have banned the show and fatwas have been issued against it. The show has also been criticised for furthering a perceived political agenda for the government of Turkey.

== Plot ==
Ertrugrul was a 13th-century Turkic Muslim nomad warrior from Central Asia. Surrounded by the Mongols to the east and the Crusaders and Byzantines to the west; like other Turkic tribes, Ertrugrul's tribe too was pushed west by the Mongols. The Ertrugrul's Turkmen did fight for a homeland, which was established by Ertrugrul's son Osman as the Ottoman Empire. Ertrugrul TV serial attempts to present a vivid imagining of a 13th-century Turkic Asian community and Muslim culture.

=== Season 1 ===
Süleyman Şah, Bey of the Kayı sends his son, Ertuğrul, to ask for land from the Emir of Aleppo. This is made almost impossible when the Kayı are put in a series of problems with the Templars after saving Şehzade Numan, Halime Sultan, and Şehzade Yiğit because of the traitor in the Emir's palace, Nasir, who works for the Templars but is later killed by Ertuğrul and the truth is shown to the Emir. A problem also arises with Kurdoğlu Bey, Süleyman Şah's adoptive brother, who seeks his brother's Beylik with the help of Selcan Hatun, Ertuğrul's adopted sister and sister-in-law, who wants revenge from Süleyman Şah as he killed her treacherous father, Alptekin Bey. Ertuğrul, who loves Halime, marries her after much difficulty. Selcan's husband, Gündoğdu, grows angry regarding Ertuğrul's actions but eventually calms down and supports his brother. Towards the end of the season, Kurdoğlu is beheaded, Ertuğrul successfully defeats the Templars and captures their castle, and Selcan repents. This is followed by Süleyman Şah's death and the tribe's migration to Erzurum as part of Süleyman Şah's will before he died.

=== Season 2 ===
The Kayı, settled in Erzurum, seek refuge with the Dodurga after the Mongols, led by Baycu Noyan, massacre half their tribe. This leads to Ertuğrul facing Tuğtekin, his cousin, who is jealous of him along with Gündoğdu again who is misled by the big threat within the Dodurga; Aytolun and her brother Gümüştekin. Aytolun married Tuğtekin's father, Korkut Bey, so that she could help Gümüştekin become the margrave of all the Turkmen tribes with the help of Emir Sadettin after killing Korkut. Only Selcan is aware of this threat and constantly attempts to warn Gündoğdu, who ignores her for her misdeeds in the past. Along with these schemes, Kocabaş, Tuğtekin's alp who works for Baycu Noyan, turns Tuğtekin against Ertuğrul making their relationship worse but is later killed by Ertuğrul, and his relations with Tuğtekin gradually improves. Aytolun and Gümüştekin are killed after their treachery is caught when Selcan's words are listened to and Korkut is killed. Noyan is supposedly killed by Ertuğrul after the death of Tuğtekin and the tribe is split between 1000 migrating to Ahlat with Gündoğdu and 400 migrating to Western Anatolia with Ertuğrul.

=== Season 3 ===
The poor Kayı newcomers face Ural of the rich Çavdar trade-veterans. Although Ural isn't the Bey of his tribe, he seeks more and more power, becoming jealous of the Kayı whenever something good happens to the small tribe. Meanwhile, the Templars who have infiltrated Hanlı Pazar, led by Hancı Simon, seek to kill Ertuğrul as he did to the Templars years back. Ertuğrul defeats Hancı Simon and conquers Hanlı Pazar, leaving Ural more jealous than ever. When Ural is accused of killing the Tekfur of Karacahisar, Andros, and causing problems for the Kayı, Ural is sentenced to death, however, he is saved by the devious Emir Sadettin. After the death of Candar, the Çavdar Bey, and Ural's father, Ural seeks help from the new Tekfur of Karacahisar, Vasilius, who wants to rid the Turks of the land, but is killed by Ertuğrul in an attempt to become the Bey of the Çavdar. When Vasilius attempts to ambush the Selçuk Sultan, he fails and is killed by Ertuğrul. Because of this, the Sultan makes Ertuğrul the Uç Bey angering Emir Sadettin, who vows to end Ertuğrul. At the end of the season, Ertuğrul falls into an ambush set by the new Tekfur of Karacahisar, Ares.

=== Season 4 ===
It is believed that Ertuğrul is dead despite the truth being that he is actually captured by some slave traders. Meanwhile, Emir Sadettin convinces Dündar, Ertuğrul's brother and the new Kayı Bey, into selling Hanlı Pazar and moving back to Gündoğdu's tribe but is stopped upon Ertuğrul's return and is forthwith banished. After Ertuğrul's son, Gündüz, is kidnapped, Ertuğrul declares war against Karacahisar and is successful in conquering it. Following Ares' capture, Ertuğrul takes him to the Sultan and tells him to confess to the Sultan about Sadettin Köpek's misdeeds. The plan nearly works but Köpek is saved by the Sultan's wife, Mahperi, and leads to an event turning Ares, later killed by Noyan, into a Muslim. Soon after that, the Sultan is poisoned to death and Köpek's increase in power in the palace creates problems for the new Sultan, Gıyaseddin. Gıyaseddin allies with Ertuğrul and with the help of Hüsamettin Karaca, Köpek is beheaded. Halime dies in childbirth, giving birth to Ertuğrul's third and youngest son - the prophesied Osman. After this, Ertuğrul faces the return of Noyan but is successful in defeating him and his devious sister, Alangoya, who attempted to kill Osman. Noyan prepares for a battle, historically known as the Battle of Köse Dağ, and the Kayı move to Söğüt.

=== Season 5 ===
After 10 years in Söğüt, in a Mongol-controlled Selçuk state, Ertuğrul faces many Mongol commanders including Alıncak and Subutai, along with the Selçuk assassin working with the Mongols, Beybolat. Beybolat is disguised with the name, Albastı, and he arrives following the death of his father, Umur Bey, Bey of the Umuroğlu tribe, who was sent to become the new tax collector of Söğüt. Umur Bey was killed by the disgraced Byzantine commander, Dragos, disguised as Söğüt Zangoç (transl. bellringer), who seeks to take over the town. Beybolat, who becomes his father's successor, and Dragos, who takes control over Lefke Castle after killing the innocent Tekfur Yannis, cause many problems for Ertuğrul including Beybolat's control over Söğüt for a while. İlbilge, Beybolat's sister, is the only person in her family supporting justice; with her help, Ertuğrul, defeats and kills both Beybolat and Dragos. Following Beybolat's death, Ertuğrul faces Arikbuka, a feared Mongol spy and Alıncak's blood brother, along with the spy, Qiyat, who works for Hulagu against Berke, Ertuğrul's ally and the Han of the Golden Horde. The season ends with the death of Arikbuka and Qiyat along with Ertuğrul's marriage to İlbilge Hatun.

== Episodes ==
Series	Episodes	Originally released		
Series	Episodes	First released	Last released	Network
1	26 (Note: 76 on Netflix)	10 December 2014	17 June 2015	TRT 1
2	35 (Note: 103 on Netflix)	30 September 2015	8 June 2016	TRT 1
3	30 (Note: 91 on Netflix)	26 October 2016	14 June 2017	TRT 1
4	30 (Note: 90 on Netflix)	25 October 2017	6 June 2018	TRT 1
5	29 (Note: 88 on Netflix)	7 November 2018	29 May 2019	TRT 1

== Cast and characters ==
- Engin Altan Düzyatan as Ertuğrul Bey:
  Ertuğrul Bey, based on the historical figure of the same name, is the son of Süleyman Şah and Hayme Hatun, husband of Halime Hatun and İlbilge Hatun, and the father of Gündüz Alp, Savcı Bey and Osman Bey. After the death of his father, he leads a portion of the tribe to the western borders of the Sultanate of Rum and establishes himself as the Bey of his own Kayı tribe. He frequently battles against Templars, Mongols and Byzantines. Düzyatan was initially reluctant to accept the role, fearing the show would be "ridiculous". He read 13th century works such as the Book of Dede Korkut in preparation for the part. Düzyatan called Ertuğrul "a real hero", and "smart, mature and just", praising his "vision, strength, purpose in life and all of his values", comparing him to Batman and Spider-Man.
- Kaan Taşaner as Gündoğdu Bey:
  Gündoğdu Bey, based on the historical figure of the same name, is the eldest son of Süleyman Şah and older half-brother of Ertuğrul. He is married to Selcan Hatun and has two sons. For the first season, Taşaner "preferred Gündoğdu to behave like [himself]". By February 2019, Taşaner was in negotiations to reprise the role for the fifth season.
- Hülya Darcan as Hayme Hatun:
  Hayme Hatun, based on the historical figure of the same name, is the widow of Süleyman Şah and mother of Ertuğrul. Darcan "found some of [Hayme's] characteristics in [herself], such as her patience, love of children, and sense of justice and self-sacrifice", with co-star Hande Subaşı describing Darcan as "like a mother" to the other actors during filming. Commentators praised Hayme's characterization, with Darcan hoping Hayme would be an example for women.
- Didem Balçın as Selcan Hatun:
  Selcan Hatun, loosely based on the Book of Dede Korkut character Princess Saljan, is the wife of Gündoğdu, elder sister of Gökçe Hatun and sister-in-law of Ertuğrul. Balçın felt that Selcan was "a respected woman" as "she left her individuality and thought of the whole", and that her depiction was "important in terms of showing the importance given to a woman." Balçın reprised the role in the sequel, Kuruluş: Osman.
- Esra Bilgiç as Halime Hatun:
  Halime Hatun, based on the historical figure of the same name, is the first wife of Ertuğrul, the mother of his children, and the Hanım of the Kayı tribe. Bilgiç made her acting debut in the series, calling it "an unbelievable opportunity" for her. Bilgiç described Halime as "cool-headed", with comparisons made to Hürrem Sultan; Bilgiç felt there were differences between the pair. She practiced swordfighting for the role, and said her role was ended after the fourth season as "the story of the new season [was] changed".
- Cengiz Coşkun as Turgut Alp:
  Turgut Alp, based on the historical figure of the same name, is an alp of Ertuğrul Bey. Coşkun said he was excited "to revive such an important historical character", visiting Turgut Alp's grave during filming for the second season. Coşkun trained for one year for the role, and was considered for five different roles before being cast as Turgut, saying that he joined the series as "there was no project describing the founding period of the Ottoman Empire" at the time. He characterized Turgut as "a person who solves problems [...] with his intelligence" rather than with weapons.
- Nurettin Sönmez as Bamsı Beyrek:
  Bamsı Beyrek, based on the Book of Dede Korkut character of the same name, is an alp of Ertuğrul Bey. Sönmez did not appear in part of the second season due to a foot injury incurred in a motorcycle accident. Sönmez said he "focused on the [...] effects of the conditions and atmosphere of the period on people", and "set [his] heart on being Bamsı Beyrek." Sönmez called Bamsı "a duty man", saying he was "like a walking heart" and "very attached to his brothers [fellow alps]". Sönmez reprised the role in Kuruluş: Osman.
- Hande Soral as İlbilge Hatun:
  İlbilge Hatun, loosely based on the historical figure El Bilga Khatun, is the daughter of Umur Bey of the Umuroğlu tribe and sister of Beybolat Bey and Sırma Hatun. She is the second wife of Ertuğrul Bey. With İlbilge taking Halime Hatun's role in the series, TRT 1 coordinator Kurtuluş Zaman said Ertuğrul "fall[s] in love with the sister of his worst enemy", adding her love with Ertuğrul was "as if [it was] the first season".

== Production ==
The series is written and produced by Mehmet Bozdağ and directed by Metin Günay. The theme music is by Alpay Göktekin. Broadcasting began in December 2014 on TRT 1 (Turkey).

Bozdağ stated:

An artist's task is to reconstruct history. The history changes with the opinion of the author. And for one thing, there is very little information about the period we are presenting – not exceeding 4–5 pages. Even the names are different in every source. The first works written about the establishment of the Ottoman State were written about 100–150 years after its establishment. There is no certainty in this historical data. But history has a soul. We think that we describe the spirit of the 13th century in history. We are shaping a story by dreaming.

The Daily Sabah reported TRT representative İbrahim Eren as claiming that the series aims to strengthen the national sentiment of Turkish people by "teaching the audience how the Turkish state came into existence, through a combination of history and quality entertainment."

=== Development process ===
Preparations for the first season began in February 2014. In five months, the stories and drawings were ready. Gambat from Mongolia had drawings made in three months. The teams started their work in May 2014. The decoration and art team consisted of sixty people and worked for 4 months for the first episode. 4000 square meters of fabric were used for costumes and décor. As for the choreography of the show, Nomad, the special choreography crew of movies such as The Expendables 2, 47 Ronin, and Conan the Barbarian, from Kazakhstan, was invited to Turkey. The crew prepared special choreographies for actors, horses, and other scenes. The cast took riding, sword fighting and archery lessons for 3 months. There were 25 horses on the set, attended by a veterinarian, who specially trained them. All are maintained on a horse farm in Riva. A special area similar to a zoo (but on a smaller scale) was created for all the animals which appear in the show, which include gazelles, sheep, goats, nightingales and partridges. The shooting time of the first episode was about a month. A total of 5000 people were cast for all 5 seasons of the show.

=== Costume designs ===
For the series, around 1800 costumes and thousands of war supplies and accessories were made from scratch. The TV series is a milestone in Turkey with respect to its administration of art. Copper and other metallic accessories are accumulated from various parts of Turkey. Nearly everything all over Turkey was 'confiscated', from jewellery to a piece of cloth. Wooden materials were made by hand, one by one.

=== Shooting locations ===
Season	Shooting location	Ref.
1	Riva, Istanbul, Turkey	
2	Riva, Istanbul, Turkey	
3	Nevşehir, Turkey	
4	Nevşehir, Turkey	
5	Riva, Istanbul, Turkey	

Season one was filmed around Beykoz and Riva in Istanbul. Diriliş: Ertuğrul set up two plateaus for Riva and Beykoz Kundura Factory for the first season. The plateau in Riva was erected on a total area of 40,000 m^{2} with 35 tents built according to the original. In the Beykoz Kundura factory, Aleppo, Aleppo Palace, supply room, guest rooms, corridors, dungeons, Kara Toygar's room, the Seljuk pavilion, temple halls, and rooms, lodges, and tent interiors were built on a closed area of 6,000 m^{2}. In the Kundura factory, the Aleppo Bazaar, the interior of the fortress, the interior of the tent by Süleyman Şah, the dungeon, the corridor, and the altar of the temple were built on an open area of 5,000 m^{2}.

== Reception ==
Turkish president Recep Tayyip Erdoğan with the cast of season 1 in 2015

The pilot episode was the most watched Turkish television episode on the day of its release. Recep Tayyip Erdoğan, president of Turkey, visited the set with his family more than once. The series has been called a Turkish Game of Thrones, and fans include Venezuela's president Nicolás Maduro and the queen of Malaysia Tunku Azizah Aminah Maimunah Iskandariah.

The series is one of Turkey's most successful television exports, and echoes with the message of Erdoğan and his party. According to professor Burak Özçetin, "They are, in a way, rewriting the Ottoman history for the current Turkish public."

Along with Turkey, the series is popular in Azerbaijan, due to a perceived common heritage. The series has attracted audience from several other countries, especially those with large Turkish or Muslim populations.

=== Pakistan ===
The Prime Minister of Pakistan, Imran Khan, praised the show publicly and recommended people in Pakistan to watch it. He requested the state-owned Pakistan Television Corporation (PTV) to dub the Turkish series into Urdu and broadcast it on TV. PTV secured television rights for the series from TRT, and the first episode was eventually aired in Pakistan on the first day of Ramadan (24 April) on PTV Home in 2020.

The show is called Ertugrul Ghazi in Pakistan, and was noted to be a major success there particularly due to Khan's recommendation, and also partly due to the COVID-19 pandemic quarantine. PTV's YouTube channel for the series had gained over 5 million subscribers as of June 2020. According to PTV, the series in Urdu had acquired a viewership of over 130 million people as of mid-May, and as of September, its subscribers crossed 10 million. 25 per cent of the series YouTube audience overall in the world is from Pakistan. It has been very successful in Pakistan (ratings were even better than in Turkey).

Several of the actors expressed gratitude for the attention from Pakistani fans, Engin Altan Düzyatan and Esra Bilgiç adding that they would like to visit the country. In December 2020, the Turkish embassy in Pakistan announced that Düzyatan will be visiting Pakistan. He arrived in Lahore and visited historical Lahori sites including Badshahi Mosque on his short trip.

=== Bangladesh ===
The series was popular in Bangladesh.

Turkish Ambassador to Bangladesh Mustafa Osman Turan said that the Turkish TV series plays a significant role in bringing the people of the two fraternal countries together. "People of Bangladesh learn about Turkey's history, culture, and norms through Turkish series, and thus a cultural bond is developing between the people of the two Muslim countries," he added.

=== India ===
The series is also quite popular with Indian Muslims and amongst Kashmiri Muslims in particular in Jammu and Kashmir, where people see it as an inspiration in the Kashmir conflict despite internet shutdowns. A Kashmiri public relations professional said "Every Kashmiri must watch it. A small tribe of 2,000 people triumph. It's inspirational. If you have a goal and the will to achieve it, nothing can come in your way." Abhinav Pandya, author, compares Diriliş: Ertuğrul's success in India with that of the Israeli drama Fauda, saying that "Just as Fauda fandom signals the shift of India's influencers towards a more militant and exclusionary nationalism, the Ertugrul craze is a signpost written for the alienation of many of India's 180 million Muslims from that dominant political culture and their search for solidarity elsewhere. " According to Renuka Narayanan while TV series provides interesting window into imagined Muslim culture of 13 century, the serial does not seem to be innocent enough. Narayanan says the serial amounts to be state-endorsed vigorous promotion of Islamic revivalism by the Turkish government. Episodes are peppered with the word ‘kafir’ or ‘infidel’. Ertrugrul's aide Bamsi, otherwise a captivating character, jokes ad nauseam about killing non-Muslims, and Ertrugrul constantly declares his ambition of making the whole world Muslim. His enemies, be they Christian or Mongol, are portrayed as amoral and cruel. The script even takes a subtle dig at Iranians by naming a slimy trader-spy ‘Afrosiyab’ after a Persian hero. Narayanan contemplates re-mosqueing of Hagia Sophia is a strong influence of reel life on real life, bemoaned by writers like Orhan Pamuk and moderates in Turkish society.

=== Arab world ===
On 10 February 2020, Diriliş: Ertuğrul was banned in Egypt, Saudi Arabia and the United Arab Emirates. Egypt's Dar al-Ifta al-Misriyyah announced it was forbidden to watch the series. It also targeted Turkey's President Erdoğan in a statement, stating that his intention was to restore the Ottoman Empire in the Middle East and restore sovereignty over the Arab countries that had previously been under Ottoman rule. Despite the ban, the series remained quite popular in these countries.

=== Political agenda ===
Some journalists have commented on the series political agenda. Hüseyin Topel says that Diriliş: Ertuğrul is more effective than any other TRT series at conveying aspects of the government agenda, and that the AKP government messages in the series increased as the show grew more popular. Selim Aydın also names the series as one criticized for being a mouthpiece of the government. The show blurs the difference between entertainment and state-sanctioned propaganda, according to Josh Carney in a study published in Review of Middle East Studies; he points at a four-minute commercial that TRT (and a private pro-government channel, A Haber) ran to promote the 2017 Turkish constitutional referendum, presenting Turkish prime minister Recep Tayyip Erdoğan as a successor to a list of historic Turkish leaders including Ertuğrul, using the music from the show. Unlike other similar shows, such as The Magnificent Century (which ran on Turkish TV from 2011 to 2014 and focuses on Suleiman the Magnificent), it has female characters that are "equal partners" to the men in the show.

== Sequel ==
The series proceeds with Kuruluş: Osman which is situated after Ertuğrul goes to Konya and Dündar returns to the tribe. The new series began in November 2019 and focuses on Ertuğrul's son, Osman Bey, based on Osman I, the founder of the Ottoman Empire.

== Historical accuracy ==
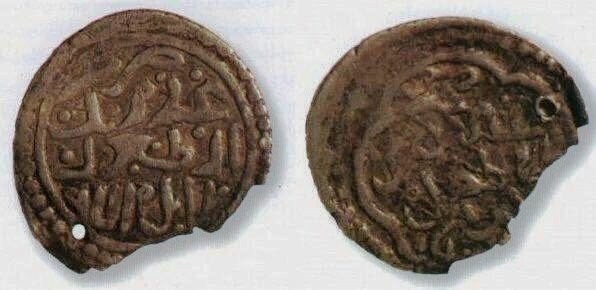
Minted coins by Osman I, indicating the existence of Ertuğrul and that the father of Ertuğrul was Gündüz Alp

Bozdağ has noted that historical records from the period are scarce. Historical inconsistencies include:

- Halil İnalcık stated that Ertuğrul's father was Gündüz Alp, not Süleyman Şah. The coins exhibited in the Istanbul Archeology Museum also support the claim that Ertuğrul's father was Gündüz Alp.
- Sungur Tekin returned to their ancestral homeland with his brother Gündoğdu after the death of Süleyman Şah in history. In the series, Ertuğrul decides to go with them and later separate.
- Afşin Bey, who came to Kayı in the series, is a Seljuk commander who fought in the Battle of Malazgirt in real history. It is impossible for someone who was on the stage of history in 1071 to communicate with the Kayı in 1225.
- In the series, Ertuğrul's wife, Halime Hatun, is shown as the daughter of a Seljuk prince, but Halime Hatun did not have any blood ties with the Seljuk ancestry.
- Baiju Noyan is a commander who turned the Anatolian Seljuks into a state dependent on the Mongols in history and has no contact with Kayı. In the series, he fought with the Kayı and was even taken as prisoner by them in an episode.
- The encounter between İbn-i Arabi and Ertuğrul Bey in the series has been criticised because the age difference between them is very high. The historical Ibn Arabi died in 1240 and Ertuğrul Bey in the 1280s. The Crusader threat has also been perceived to have been exaggerated over the Mongol threat.

== See also ==
- List of Islam-related films
