= Division of the Kayı tribe =

13th century Oghuz Turkic migration

Division of the Kayı
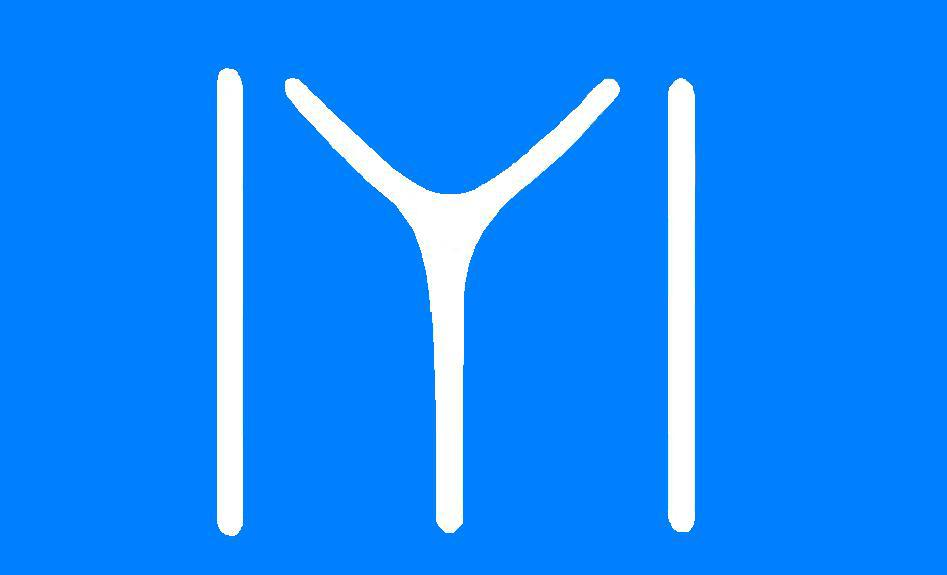
- Flag of the Kayı tribe
Location	Near Aleppo
Result	400 people migrate to Söğüt with Ertuğrul and 1000 people migrate to Central Asia with Gündoğdu Bey

Belligerents
Ertuğrul and his supporters	Gündoğdu Bey and his supporters

Strength
400 people	1000 people

After the death of Ertuğrul's father, the Oghuz Turkic Kayı tribe was divided when Ertuğrul's elder brothers, Gündoğdu Bey and Sungurtekin Bey (Note: also known as Sungurtekin Gazi, Songur Tigin or Sungur Tekin), decided to migrate to Central Asia, while Ertuğrul and his younger brother Dündar wanted to migrate to Söğüt.

== Sungur Tekin and Gündoğdu ==
The only information existing about the lives of Ertuğrul's elder brothers is about what they did before the division of the Kayı tribe.

Sungurtekin Bey and Gündoğdu Bey were both very close to the government of the Sultanate of Rum.

=== Biographies ===
Sungurtekin (Ottoman Turkish: سنقوردكن) worked as a spy for the Seljuks in Ögedai's army and passed on the information he got but was possibly killed when he was caught. However, according to other sources, he returned to the tribe.

Gündoğdu Bey ' (Ottoman Turkish: كونطوغدى) took part in the Battle of Yassıçemen where he fought alongside his brother, Ertuğrul, and Sultan Alaaddin Keykubad I of the Sultanate of Rum. After this, Ertuğrul clothed Gündoğdu with something called Hilat, an armour worn after victory.

== Division of the tribe ==
There isn't much information about the older brothers of Ertuğrul, however, one of the things that they are known for is that they migrated to Ahlat rather than Söğüt, which was where Ertuğrul migrated from Sivas. Most of the tribe wanted to migrate to Central Asia, their homeland, and therefore, 1000 people migrated to Central Asia with the older brothers, and 400 people migrated with the younger brothers. According to sources, Hayme Hatun was with Ertuğrul in this migration. The reason why Ertuğrul and Dündar decided to migrate to Söğüt was either that they wanted to escape the Mongol onslaught, what the Turkmen tribes had been doing for decades, or that they wanted to populate the area gifted to Ertuğrul by Keykubad I with Oghuz Turks.

== Aftermath ==
Gündoğdu Bey and Sungurtekin Bey lived unremarkably quiet lives and only verbal accounts of them were told by different people through time. Hence, they were forgotten about as time passed and they were said to not be "paid attention to" as a punishment for not migrating with Ertuğrul. Not mentioned in Mongol records, it was also said that they were attacked in a great Mongol invasion where they suffered big losses. As they silently disappeared from history, not even their graves could be found till this day.

=== In modern days ===
In Turkmenistan, the Kayı tribe is one of the main divisions of the Geklen Turkmens living in the Balkan Region and consists of the following clans: adnakel, ak kel, alatelpek, bagly, barak, burkaz, ganjyk, gapan, garabalkan, garawul, garagol, garagul, garadaşly, garakel, garga, garyşmaz and others. The Kayı are also a clan among the Bayat Turkmens of the Lebap Region. The Kayıs in Turkmenistan probably migrated with Gündoğdu Bey and Sungurtekin Bey and thus it is very likely that they indeed survived after their migration to Central Asia.

=== In popular culture ===
In the Turkish TV series, Diriliş: Ertuğrul and its sequel, Kuruluş: Osman, Sungurtekin Gazi is played by the Turkish actor Sezgin Erdemir. In Diriliş: Ertuğrul, Gündoğdu Bey was portrayed by the Turkish actor Kaan Taşaner. The Kayı were also divided in the series.
