= Kemal Tekden =

Turkish politician

Member of the Grand National Assembly
- Incumbent
- Assumed office 1 November 2015
- Constituency: Kayseri (June 2015)

Personal details
- Born: January 1, 1959 (age 67) Kayseri, Turkey
- Party: Justice and Development Party
- Children: 3
- Education: Istanbul University

Kemal Tekden (born January 1, 1959) is a Turkish politician and businessman.

== Biography ==
Kemal Tekden graduated from Istanbul University Faculty of Medicine. Leaving the civil service in 1993, he opened the first private medical center in Kayseri. Later on, he ventured into politics, having announced his candidacy for the membership of the parliament of Kayseri for the 7 June elections in 2014, becoming one of the 500 deputies from the 4th rank with the AK Party, which won 317 seats. He is married and has three children. He is also one of the producers of the series, Diriliş: Ertuğrul on TRT 1.

== Filmography ==
- Diriliş: Ertuğrul (2014) - executive producer
