= Turgut Alp (fictional character) =

Character from 2014 Turkish TV show

- Diriliş: Ertuğrul character Kuruluş: Osman character
- Cengiz Coşkun as Turgut Alp
- First appearance: "Pilot" (2014)
- Based on: Turgut Alp
- Adapted by: Mehmet Bozdağ
- Portrayed by: Cengiz Coşkun

In-universe information
- Full name: Konur Alp oğlu Turgut Alp (Note: transl. Turgut Alp, son of Konur Alp)
- Aliases: Turgut Bey; Judas (when brainwashed); Turgut Alpbaşı (Note: transl. Chief Alp Turgut); Turgut Gazi ( Kuruluş:Osman)
- Position: Bey (formerly); Alpbaşı (transl. Chief Alp) (formerly)
- Affiliation: Kayı tribe Çavdar tribe Sultanate of Rum; Knights Templar (when brainwashed)
- Weapon: Battleaxe
- Family: Konur Alp (father); Süleyman Şah (adoptive father); Hayme Hatun (adoptive mother); Ertuğrul Bey (adoptive brother); Bamsı Beyrek (adoptive brother); Doğan Alp (adoptive brother)
- Spouses: Aykız Hatun; Aslıhan Hatun
- Relatives: Deli Demir (father-in-law); Aliyar Bey (brother-in-law)
- Religion: Islam
- Nationality: Oğuz Turkish

Kuruluş:Osman

Turgut Alp, also known as Turgut Bey, is a character in the Turkish TV series Diriliş: Ertuğrul and Kuruluş Osman. Turgut is portrayed by Turkish actor Cengiz Coşkun both in Diriliş Ertuğrul and in Kuruluş Osman. The character is based on one of the companions of Ertuğrul, the father of Osman I.

== Background ==
Turgut was born as the son of Konur Alp, but was soon orphaned after his parents' deaths in unknown circumstances. He was later found in a forest by Ertuğrul Bey, along with two other orphans, Bamsı Beyrek and Doğan Alp. He was brought to the Kayı tribe and grew up as the adoptive son of Süleyman Şah and Hayme Hatun, and became blood brothers with Bamsı and Doğan. He also fell in love with Aykız, the daughter of the Kayı blacksmith Deli Demir, as a child.

=== Personality ===
Turgut is shown as a brave warrior of the Kayı willing to do anything for his Bey surviving the harshest of times. The TRT 1 website states about his character; "A fearsome axe-wielding warrior, Turgut is one of the most skilled alps of the Kayi tribe. Although his loyalty is put to the test, he remains a close friend and confidant of Ertugrul."

== Storyline ==
=== Season 1 ===
Turgut Alp is shown as one of Ertuğrul Bey's main alps and is preparing for a wedding with his childhood sweetheart Aykız. Following an ambush by the Templars, who are after Ertuğrul, him and Şehzade Yiğit, the brother of Ertuğrul's lover Halime, are captured and taken to the Templar Castle. Turgut is tortured, poisoned and then brainwashed while the Templars attempt to make Yiğit the leader of the Selçuks after manipulating him into following them. Meanwhile, at the Kayı tribe, Aykız attempts to save Turgut with the help of Ertuğrul but they fail as Turgut is brainwashed. After Ertuğrul captures the Templars' Kardinal Thomas, the Templars give Turgut back to Ertuğrul in exchange. However, Turgut is still brainwashed and attacks and wounds Ertuğrul, Doğan and Bamsı, only for them to be saved by Ertuğrul's half-brother, Gündoğdu Bey. After being taken to the tribe and continuously being given the poison used to brainwash him by the tribe's traitor Kurdoğlu Bey, Turgut is imprisoned for some time but he comes back to his senses later because of Aykiz his lover. on and he even saves Ertuğrul's family after they were exiled by Kurdoğlu. Kurdoğlu is also later beheaded and Turgut marries Aykız, with her father Deli Demir's consent. Once all the problems are solved, including the death of the leader of the Knights Templar, the Kayı move to Erzurum, following the will of Ertuğrul's father and the Kayı Bey, Süleyman Şah.

=== Season 2–3 ===
Following the Kayı being forced to take refuge with the Dodurga due to a Mongol attack led by Baycu Noyan, a pregnant Aykız is killed much to Turgut's devastation. When Ertuğrul is exiled for being rebellious, Turgut is shown to move out with his Bey. After preventing the loyal Abdurrahman Alp from being executed, he is devastated when his father-in-law Deli Demir dies. After Yiğit returns, Turgut is captured by Noyan while Yiğit attempts to show the Mongols that he supports them and that he is rebelling against the Sultan. Following a series of events, including Turgut being saved, Turgut leaves the Kayı tribe out of anger after Ertuğrul stops him from killing Noyan. Ertuğrul allows him to leave, leading to him discovering the treachery of a Dodurga alp, Boğaç, and eventually killing him before he could murder Ertuğrul's son Gündüz. After Yiğit is killed in Boğaç's ambush, Ertuğrul continues to lead a portion of his tribe to Western Anatolia, separating from his elder brother Gündoğdu. In the third season, Turgut works as Ertuğrul's spy in the Public Market. Maria, the sister of the Public Market's devious owner, is shown to love Turgut, although when she finds out that Turgut had been betraying her brother Simon, a Templar official, she seeks revenge, wanting him dead. Turgut successfully kills Maria whilst Ertuğrul defeats Simon, the Public Market's owner, and conquers the market.

=== Season 4–5 and Kuruluş: Osman ===
For political reasons, Ertuğrul requests Turgut to marry Aslıhan, the daughter of Candar Bey and the Bey of the Çavdar tribe, who had an unrequited love for Ertuğrul, and became the Bey upon her brother Aliyar's death in the third season. Though the marriage began due to political reasons, Turgut and Aslıhan later fell in love with one another. Sadettin Köpek, a traitorous Seljuk Vizier, is in love with Aslıhan, leading to Köpek poisoning both of them on their wedding night through jealousy, although both are cured by Artuk Bey. Later on, after Köpek's intentions become clearer after the death of the Sultan, Aslıhan attempts to kill him but fails and Aslihan is killed by him instead, devastating Turgut who swears revenge against Köpek. After Ertuğrul beheads the dog Köpek, thereby avenging Aslıhan, and defeating the returned Noyan, the Kayı move to Söğüt. In the fifth season, Osman, son of Ertuğrul, saves two girls and their father who were fleeing from the disgraced Byzantine commander, Dragos. The elder girl is shown to have romantic affections towards Turgut, although this remains unrequited. Later on, Ertuğrul tasks Turgut and his new ally, Mergen, to search for a chest kept by the Mongols. After Turgut disguises himself as a "Mongol-spy-in-the-Turks", he and Mergen are successful in taking the chest. Meanwhile, Beybolat Bey, a Selçuk assassin working with the Mongols to wipe out rebelling Oğuz tribes, captures Ertuğrul in an ambush while almost killing Turgut by stabbing him . Both survive, Beybolat and Dragos are killed, and the series ends with Turgut and Ertuğrul heading off for war. Turgut is again mentioned in the sequel series, Kuruluş: Osman, once by Selcan Hatun in passing in conversation with Osman in season 1, and again when being remembered by Ertuğrul in his final moments in season 2. Another Turgut Alp is shown in Season 3 and the whereabouts of the Original Turgut are not mentioned. Original Turgut comes back in series' 190th episode.

== Positions ==
After Ertuğrul migrated to the Western borders, he appointed Turgut as the Alpbaşı, literally meaning 'Chief Alp'. This gave Turgut command of all the alps of his tribe, although his post was given to Bamsı when he became the Bey of the Çavdar tribe after marrying Aslıhan Hatun.

Alpbaşıs of the Kayı tribe (in fiction)

Unknown (Note: Either Süleyman Şah, Alptekin Bey or most likely Kurdoğlu Bey.)
Ertuğrul Bey
Tuğtekin Bey (Note: Joint with the Dodurga tribe, whilst Tuğtekin himself is a Dodurga.)
Gündoğdu Bey (Note: Joint with the Dodurga tribe.)
Sungurtekin Bey (Note: Joint with the Dodurga tribe.)
Turgut Alp (Note: Joint with the Çavdar tribe after Kutluca Alp's martyrdom.)	Sungurtekin Bey (Note: Joint with the Dodurga tribe, before the Dodurgas migrate to the western borders of the state.)
Bamsı Beyrek (Note: Joint with the Çavdar tribe before the Kayıs migrate to Söğüt.)	Unknown (Note: Possibly Dündar Bey, İltekin Bey, Süleyman Alp or Sungurtekin's son.)
Abdurrahman Alp
Bamsı Beyrek
Gündüz Bey
Batur Bey
Savcı Bey
Göktuğ Alp
Gündüz Bey

Notes:

Beys of the Çavdar tribe (in fiction)

Yenal Bey (Note: Father of Candar and Bahadır.)
Candar Bey	Bahadır Bey (Note: The tribe eventually merges again with Aslıhan's.)
Aliyar Bey (Note: Ural briefly became the Bey by force during Aliyar's reign.)
Aslıhan Hatun (Note: Bahadır Bey briefly becomes the Bey of both the Çavdar tribes by force during Aslıhan’s reign.)
Turgut Bey
Unknown (Note: The new Çavdar Bey is mentioned to be loyal to the Mongols in Kuruluş: Osman.)

== Reception ==
Diriliş: Ertuğrul has been well received in Pakistan. The actor who portrays Turgut Alp, Cengiz Coşkun, signed a contract with Pakistani actor Hamza Ali Abbasi's sister, Fazeela Abbasi's brand. On Instagram, Fazeela Abbasi said that it was the "launch of 1st ever Men’s exclusive Skin Care line in Pakistan & Gulf" with Coşkun as the face of the brand. This has been criticised by some people who believe that local artists in Pakistan deserve to be the face of these brands. Cengiz Coşkun and Nurettin Sönmez, who plays the role of Bamsı Alp, also signed endorsement deals with one of Pakistan's leading brands Junaid Jamshed J. Cengiz Coşkun and Gülsim Ali both also wished Pakistan a happy Independence Day.

Cengiz Coşkun was invited to a Pakistani television talk show to talk about the Diriliş: Ertuğrul's unexpected popularity in the country. In the talk show, Pakistani cricketer Shahid Afridi was also invited, which led to a friendly conversation between the cricketer and the Resurrection Ertugrul star. Afridi said, “Some of my friends were pushing me to watch this drama. When they told me it had 500 episodes, I said, ‘Are you crazy’? My schedule was very busy. But once I went to Bangladesh for matches, that’s when I started watching it, and this was one and a half years ago. I liked the drama so much, I finished it in just 40 days.” Coşkun also expressed his wish to visit the country as soon as the COVID-19 pandemic is over. The actor also said that he received marriage proposals on Instagram from many Pakistani women in the interview, joking that he "couldn't marry everyone". Despite many fans' wishes, Cengiz Coşkun will not appear in the sequel series, Kuruluş: Osman, as confirmed by the actor himself in an interview with ARY News. It is unknown if the character will still be recast for the series.

In 2017, Coşkun also won the Turkey Youth Awards in the category Best Supporting Actor in a TV Series.

== In other media ==
In the Turkish television series Kuruluş "Osmancık" (1988), Turgut Alp was portrayed by Turkish actor Zekai Müftüoğlu.

== See also ==
- List of Diriliş: Ertuğrul characters
- List of Kuruluş: Osman characters
