= Hayme Hatun =

Mother of Ertuğrul, grandmother of Osman I

- Died: 1267; Çarşamba, Domaniç
- Burial: Domaniç
- Spouse: Suleyman Shah or Gündüz Alp
- Issue: Sungurtekin; Gündoğdu; Ertuğrul; Dündar

Hayme Hatun, also known as Hayma Ana (Mother Hayma), was the grandmother of Osman I, who was the founder of the Ottoman Empire. She was the mother of Ertuğrul Gazi, and Gündoğdu, who were the leaders of the Kayı clan of the Oghuz Turks. She was bestowed with and known by the title of Devlet Ana (State Mother) of the Ottoman Empire.

== Name ==
Her name appears as Haymana, Hayme Hatun, Hayme Sultan, Ayva Ana and Ayvana. The name Hayma Ana seems to be an obvious transference of the topographic term haymana, or "prairie", into a personal name.

== Burial place ==
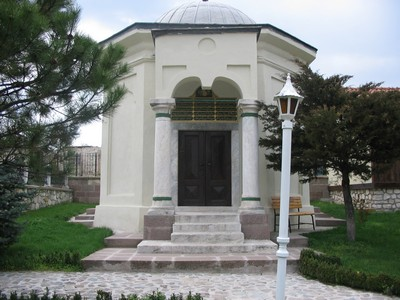
Closer view of the mausoleum of Hayma Ana

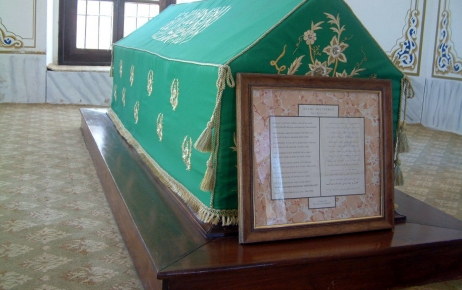
Tomb of Hayma Ana

Hayma Ana's last resting place is at Çarşamba, a village near Domaniç, in a pasture area, close to a route connecting the lowlands east of Bursa with Tavşanlı. In 1892 Abdul Hamid II commissioned the restoration of the tomb of Hayme Ana.

== Family ==
She was of Turkish descent and belonged to a Turkmen family of the Dodurga tribe. She was the grandmother of Osman I, the founder of the Ottoman Empire. She had four sons:

- Gündoğdu Bey
- Sungurtekin Bey
- Ertuğrul Gazi (father of Osman I), Bey of Söğüt
- Dündar Bey
- Suleman Shah (Hayme Hatun husband)(father of Ertugrul, Sungurtekin, Dundar)

== In popular culture ==
Hayme Hatun has been portrayed by Hülya Darcan in Turkish TV series Diriliş: Ertuğrul.

== See also ==
- Ottoman family tree (more detailed)
- Ottoman Empire
- Ottoman dynasty
- Halime Hatun
