= Forty-seven Ronin (disambiguation) =

Forty-seven Ronin refers to a case involving the samurai code of honor.

Forty-seven Ronin may also refer to:

- The 47 Ronin (1941 film), a Japanese film directed by Kenji Mizoguchi
- Chūshingura: Hana no Maki, Yuki no Maki, released as 47 Ronin in the United States and in Australia, a 1962 Japanese film directed by Hiroshi Inagaki
- 47 Ronin (1994 film), a Japanese film directed by Kon Ichikawa
- 47 Ronin (2013 film), an American film starring Keanu Reeves

== See also ==
- The Loyal Ronins, a historical novel by Tamenaga Shunsui, translated into English by Edward Greey and Shinichiro Saito in 1880
