= Riva, Istanbul =

Riva Çayağzı
- Neighbourhood
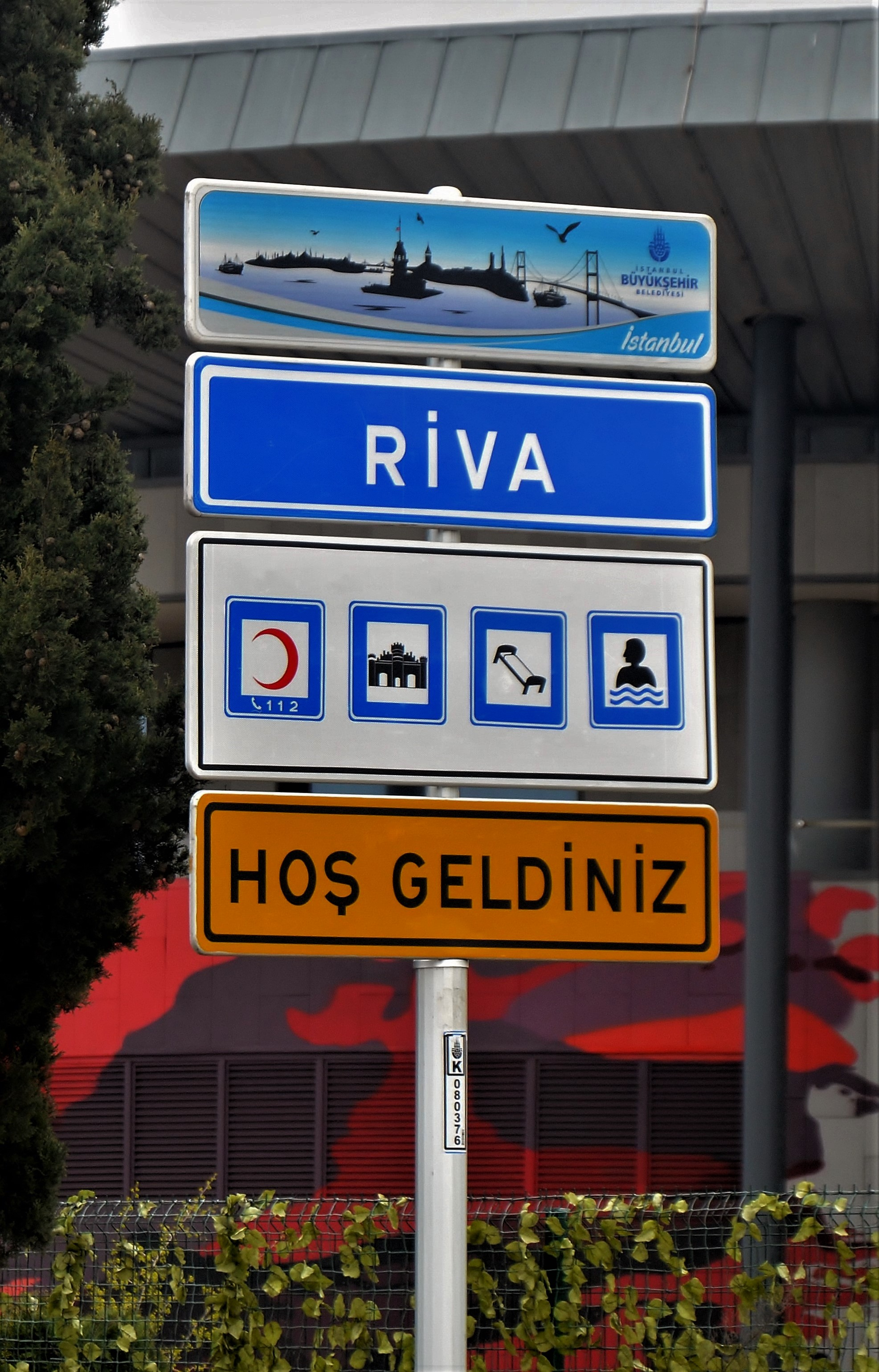

- Location within Turkey Location within Istanbul
- Coordinates: 41°13′28″N 29°13′08″E
- Country: Turkey
- Province: Istanbul
- District: Beykoz
- Elevation: 15 m (49 ft)
- Population (2022): 2,885
- Time zone: UTC+3 (TRT)
- Postal code: 34829
- Area code: 0216

Riva (also called Çayağzı) is a neighbourhood in the municipality and district of Beykoz, Istanbul Province, Turkey. Its population is 2,885 (2022). This place is the filming location of the Turkish TV show hit called Diriliş: Ertuğrul and its sequel Kuruluş: Osman. It is a coastal village in the Anatolian part of Greater Istanbul, situated between Anadolu Feneri and Şile. Çayağzı creek flows to Black Sea with in the village and there is a wide beach to the west of the creek. The distance to Beykoz center is about 16 kilometres (9.9 mi). Before the First World War, majority of the village population was composed of Greeks. But after the population exchange between Greece and Turkey in the 1920s, Greeks left the village and Turks from the Black Sea region settled in the village.

Although a part of Greater Istanbul, the village still keeps some rural features. The Byzantine era Riva Castle sits on a hill where the Riva Stream (also known as the Rheba or Live Stream) meets the Black Sea.

The headquarters of the Turkish Football Federation (TFF) is located in Riva.

== Gallery ==
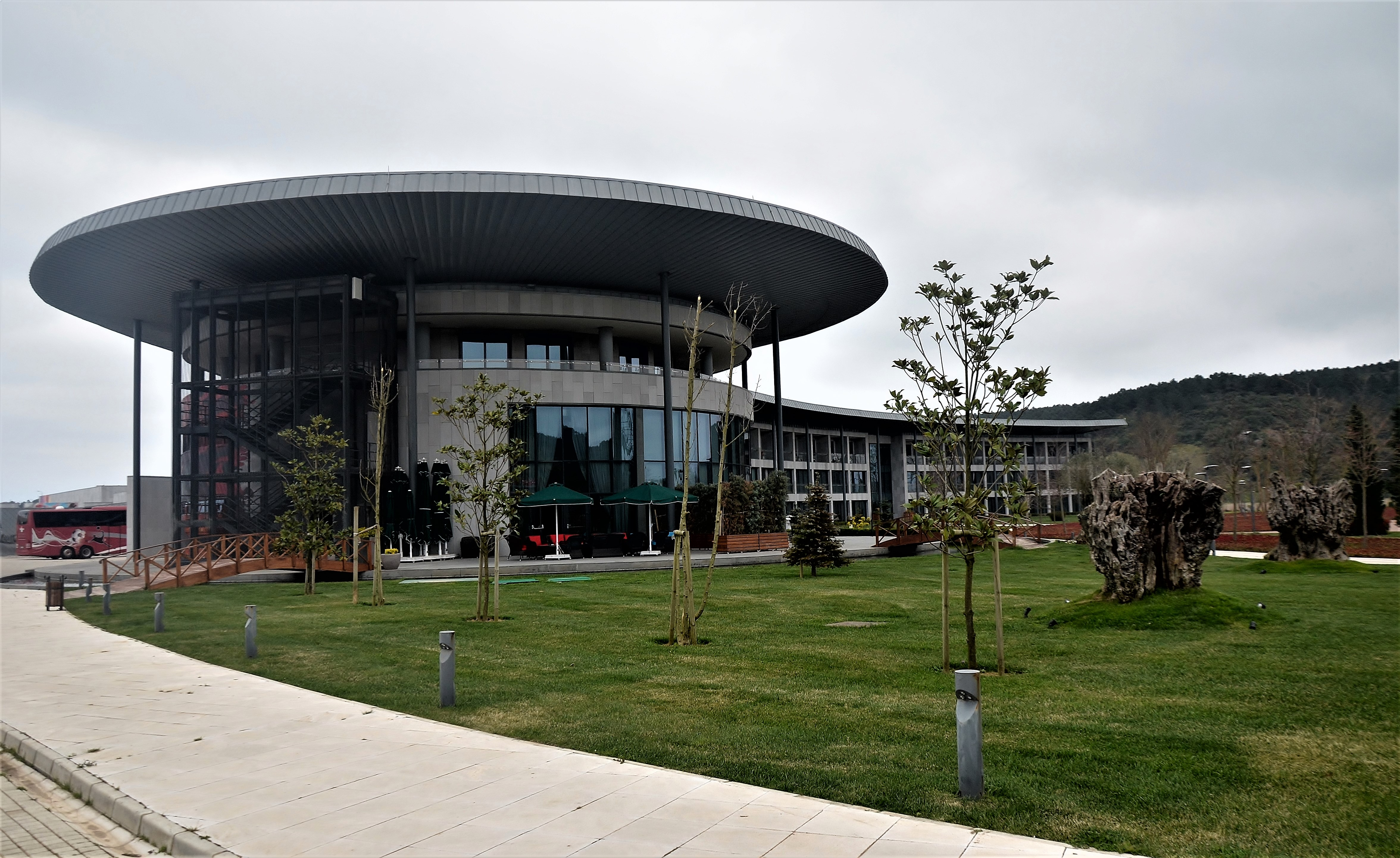
Turkish Football Federation Hasan Doğan National Teams Camp and Training Facility at Riva, Beykoz in Istanbul, Turkey.
