= Kaan Taşaner =

Turkish actor

- Born: 23 April 1979 (age 47); Antalya, Turkey
- Education: Antalya Metropolitan Municipality Theater Workshop; Selçuk University Dilek Sabancı Conservatory (Konya)
- Occupation: Actor
- Years active: 1998–present

Kaan Taşaner (born 23 April 1979) is a Turkish actor. He began his career in theater, but is most famous for his roles in Turkish television series, including Fatmagül'ün Suçu Ne? (Erdoğan Yaşaran), Kuzey Güney (Şeref Komiser), Kayip (Kemal Özdemir) and Diriliş: Ertuğrul (Gündoğdu).

== Life and career ==
=== Education ===
Kaan did not always know that he wanted to be an actor. He was undecided about his career as a teenager, but decided he might like to be on stage after seeing Danton's Death with Reha Özcan. He began training at 17 with the Antalya Metropolitan Municipality Theater Workshop, then continued at the Selçuk University Dilek Sabancı Conservatory in Konya. He is listed as a graduate for the 2002–2003 academic year.

=== Television ===
Kaan has been performing in Turkish television dramas since 2004. Two series in which he has played major roles, Fatmagül'ün Suçu Ne? and Diriliş: Ertuğrul, have received significant international attention. He commented on the international interest in Turkish productions during a July 2020 interview:

Translation: "We have Hollywood in English; I do not know what the equivalent will be, but I think we have the power to turn it [Turkish TV] into a brand. Yes, our works should be sold, but I strongly believe that we should make art in our native language. This includes television."

Before joining Uyanis: Büyük Selcuklu as Markus, Kaan had not been seen in a series for a year and a half. Although he had offers, he had not found a role he felt comfortable accepting, and articulated some observations on the current male TV roles:

Translation: "Especially this season, I find the positioning of men in the TV series very sexist. That is why I continue to read because I feel a bit responsible in this regard, prefer to avoid such things and be in a more balanced job."

During the same interview, he expressed interest in the opportunity to perform a role for the first time.

=== Music ===
Kaan's first song, Bu Bir Oyun (This is a Game), was released on Amazon on 22 November 2020. A music video as well as a video discussing the project were released on 12 December 2020.

=== Personal life ===
Kaan's mother, Sacide Taşaner, is an actress. She developed an interest in acting after Kaan began his training. Kaan was in a four-year relationship with actress Selin Şekerci, who was his co-star in Rengarenk. He left the series after their separation.

== Theatre ==
Year	Title	Role	Notes/Sources
1998	Karanlıkta ilk ışık Kubilay (The First Light in the Dark Kubilay)		Manager website
2000	Asiye Nasıl Kurtulur (How to Survuve Asiye) Antalya Metropolitan Municipality Theater Workshop		Manager website Tiyatro n.90 (p.62)
2001	Deli Dumrul (Crazy Dumrul)		Manager website
2003	Vanya Dayı (Uncle Vanya)		Manager website
2004	Soyut Padişah (Abstract Sultan)		Manager website
2005	Ana Hanım Kız Hanım (Mother Hanim, Daughter Hanim) Konya State Theater		Manager website
2005	Bağdat Hatunu (Baghdad Hatun) Konya State Theater		tiyatronline.com
2006	Buzlar Çözülmeden (Before Thawing) Konya State Theater		Manager website tiyatronline.com Tiyatro n.170 (p.11) *typo--as Kaan Taşdemir
2009	Eros Pansiyon (Eros Pension) Yalçın Menteş Theater	Başak	Manager website "Eros Pension My Impressions/Notes" Interview
2012	Babamın Cesetleri (My Father's Corpses) Krek Theater	Brother	Tiyatrolar.com tiyatronline.com
2019	Esaretin Bedeli (The Shawshank Redemption) Sadri Alışık Theater	Andy Dufresne	tiyatronline.com

== Filmography ==
=== Television ===
Year	Title	Role	Notes/Sources
2004	Büyük Buluşma (Big Meeting)		Manager website Oyuncular.com
2005	Beşinci Boyut (Fifth Dimension)	Galip	Oyuncular.com
2007	Hakkını Helal Et (Forgive Me)	Tayfun	Manager website Oyuncular.com
2008	Kendi Okulumuza Doğru (Towards Our Own School)	Ozan Öğretmen	Manager website Oyuncular.com
2010–2012	Fatmagül'ün Suçu Ne? (What is Fatmagül's Fault?)	Erdoğan Yaşaran	Manager website Oyuncular.com
2011–2013	Kuzey Güney (North South)	Şeref Komiser	Manager website Oyuncular.com
2013–2015	Kayıp (Lost)	Kemal Özdemir	Manager website Oyuncular.com
2014–2016, 2019	Diriliş: Ertuğrul (Resurrection: Ertuğrul)	Gündoğdu Bey	Manager website Oyuncular.com
2016	Rengarenk (Colorful)	Can	Manager website Oyuncular.com *series changed name with Kaan's departure
2018	Mehmetçik Kut'ül Amare	Süleyman Askeri	Manager website Oyuncular.com
2018	Şahin Tepesi (Falcon Crest)	Erkan Sarpkaya	Manager website Oyuncular.com
2020–2021	Uyanış Büyük Selçuklu (Awakening: Great Seljuk)	Mitras / Marcus	
2021	Kanunsuz Topraklar (Lawless Lands)	Yavuz	
2022	Gecenin Ucunda (Poison Ivy)	Mert Öndeş	
2023	Başım Belada (I'm in Trouble)	Çağdaş	
2024	Kızılcık Şerbeti	Giray	
2025	Bir Zamanlar İstanbul	Gökhan	

== Awards ==
Awards
Year	Award	Category	Work
2012	TelevizyonDizisi.com Awards	Best Supporting Actor	Fatmagül'ün Suçu Ne?
