= Didem Balçın =

Turkish actress (born 1982)

- Born: 18 May 1982 (age 44); Ankara, Turkey
- Occupation: Actress
- Years active: 2002–present
- Spouse: Can Aydın (m. 2020)
- Children: 1

Didem Balçın (born 18 May 1982) is a Turkish actress. She is famous for her role as 'Selcan Hatun' in the TV series, Diriliş: Ertuğrul, Kuruluş: Osman and as Fatma in franchise comedy films Çakallarla Dans.

== Life and career ==
Didem Balçın was born on 18 May 1982 in Ankara. Her father worked for TRT Radio and her mother Nur Balçın represented Turkey at a beauty pageant in Japan in 1975. Her maternal family is of Turkish and Albanian origins. She graduated from Ankara University School of Literature, History and Geography with a degree in theatre studies. After graduation she moved to Istanbul and appeared in various commercials and TV series. Her first professional appearance on stage was at Levent Kırca Theatre with a role in the play Ateşin Düştüğü Yer. In 2009, she founded her own theatre company with Nergis Öztürk. For her role in the comedy movie Bunu Yapan İki Kişi, she won the Li̇ons Award for Best Comedy Actress. After continuing her career on stage, in 2011 she founded the "Doda Sanat" Education Consultancy with her sister. She is notable for her role as Selcan Hatun in the series Diriliş: Ertuğrul and Kuruluş: Osman.

In 2021, Pakistani designer Maria B also signed her as a model for her winter collection.

== Personal life ==
Didem Balçın and Turkish actor Can Aydın were engaged in March 2020. The couple got married in May 2020. Their first child, a son named Alican, was born in April 2021.

== Filmography ==
Film
Year	Title	Role	Notes
2005	Baby Einstein: Mahalle Hayvanları	Bee	direct-to-video; Turkish dub of the series' video Neighborhood Animals
2007	Hayattan Korkma	Tuğba	Supporting role
2009	Başka Dilde Aşk	Leyla	Supporting role
2010	Çakallarla Dans	Fatma	Leading role
2010	Çıkış Noktası	Nil	Leading role
2012	Açlığa Doymak	Burcu	Leading role
2012	Göl Zamanı	Şahika	Leading role
2012	Çakallarla Dans 2: Hastasıyız Dede	Fatma	Leading role
2013	I II III IV	Ebru	Leading role (short film)
2014	Gulyabani	Yasemin	Leading role
2014	Çakallarla Dans 3: Sıfır Sıkıntı	Fatma	Leading role
2014	Oflu Hoca'nın Şifresi	Asiye	Supporting role
2016	Hicran and Melek	Melek	Leading role
2016	Çakallarla Dans 4	Fatma	Leading role
2018	Çakallarla Dans 5	Fatma	Leading role
2022	Çakallarla Dans 6	Fatma	Leading role
TBA	Diriliş: Ertuğrul	Selcan Hatun	Leading role
Television
Year	Title	Role	Notes
2003	Gurbet Kadını	Gülnaz	Supporting role
2003	Serseri Aşıklar	Yeliz	Supporting role
2005	Rüzgarlı Bahçe	Menekşe	Supporting role
2006	29-30	Bilge	Supporting role
2006	Gözyaşı Çetesi	Mine	Supporting role
2007	Gurbet Yolcuları	Seher	Supporting role
2007	Sevgili Dünürüm	Didem	Supporting role
2009	Kasaba	Iraz	Supporting role
2009	Olacak O Kadar	Sunucu	Supporting role
2010	Gönülçelen	Didem	Supporting role
2010	Kadınları Anlama Kılavuzu	Özge	Leading role
2011	Farklı Desenler	Duygu	Voice over
2011	Firar	Gönül	Supporting role
2014–2018, 2019	Diriliş: Ertuğrul	Selcan Hatun	Leading role
2017–2018	Yalaza	Alev Yanardağ	Leading role
2017	Ölene Kadar	Şahika Yoranel	Supporting role
2018	Meleklerin Aşkı	Melike Çekilmez	Leading role
2019–2022	Kuruluş: Osman	Selcan Hatun	Leading role
