= Mehmet Bozdağ =

Turkish actor and screenwriter (born 1983)

Mehmet Bozdag
- Born: 1 January 1983 (age 43); Kayseri, Turkey
- Education: Sakarya University
- Occupations: Screenwriter, film producer, director
- Years active: 2009–present
- Spouse: Aslı Zeynep Peker Bozdağ
- Children: 2

Mehmet Bozdağ (born 1 January 1983 Turkish pronunciation: [mehˈmet bozˈdaː]) is a Turkish screenwriter, film producer, and director. He is also the founder and owner of production company Bozdağ Film.

== Early life ==
Bozdağ was born in Kayseri, Turkey and got educated at Sakarya University. He also completed his master's degree in sociology at the same university. Bozdağ started his historical studies in 2004.

== Career ==
In 2009, Bozdağ worked as a screenwriter for TRT documentaries "Son Rüya" and "Kardeş Şehirler". In 2010, he wrote a documentary named "Ustalar, Alimler ve Sultanlar".

In 2014, Bozdağ made a historical Turkish drama series Diriliş: Ertuğrul. The show was very popular in Turkey and Pakistan. The next year, in 2015, he then made the season 2 for Diriliş: Ertuğrul. In the same year, he also made another historical drama named Yunus Emre: Aşkın Yolculuğu.

Bozdağ announced in 2020 that he had been working on the new project since 2018, at the request of the Government of Uzbekistan. In February 2021, Bozdağ's drama series Mendirman Jaloliddin was released on television.

Bozdağ wrote and produced the TV series Kuruluş: Osman, which aired on ATV from November 2019—June 2025. In May 2020, Bozdağ announced that he wants to collaborate with Pakistan for a future co-production.

== Filmography ==
=== Documentaries ===
- Son Rüya (2009)
- Kardeş Şehirler (2009)
- Ustalar, Alimler ve Sultanlar (2010)
- Gönül Hırsızı (2013)

=== Television series ===
| Number | Year(s) | Drama | Network | Company |
|---|---|---|---|---|
| 1 | 2014–2019 | Diriliş: Ertuğrul | TRT 1 | Tekden Film |
| 2 | 2015–2016 | Yunus Emre: Aşkin Yolculuğu | TRT 1 | Tekden Film |
| 3 | 2018–2019 | Mehmetçik Kûtulamâre | TRT 1 | Bozdağ Film |
| 4 | 2019–2025 | Kuruluş: Osman | ATV | Bozdağ Film |
| 5 | 2020 | Türkler Geliyor : Adaletin kilici | ATV | Bozdağ Film |
| 6 | 2021–2023 | Mendirman Jaloliddin | ATV | Bozdağ Film |
| 7 | 2021–2022 | Destan | ATV | Bozdağ Film |
| 8 | 2023–2024 | Ateş Kuşları | ATV | Bozdağ Film |
| 9 | 2023-present | Ibn-i-Sina | Tabii | Bozdağ Film |
| 10 | 2023 | Al Sancak | TRT 1 | Bozdağ Film |
| 11 | 2024 | Bir Sevdadır | TRT 1 | Bozdağ Film |
| 12 | 2024 | Aziz Mahmud Hüdayi: Aşkın Yolculuğu | TRT 1 | Bozdağ Film |
| 13 | 2025-2026 | Kuruluş Orhan | ATV | Bozdağ Film |
| 14 | 2026 | Aşk ve Taht | ATV | Bozdağ Film |

== Awards and nominations ==
| Year | Award | Work | Category | Result | Ref. |
| 2017 | Golden Palm Awards | Diriliş: Ertuğrul | Best Screenwriter | Won | |
| 2020 | Turkey Youth Awards | Kuruluş: Osman | Producer of the Year | Won | |

== See also ==
- List of Turkish film directors
