= Nurettin Sönmez =

Turkish actor

- Born: 23 November 1978 (age 47); Istanbul, Turkey
- Education: Istanbul University; Yeditepe University
- Occupations: Actor, teacher
- Years active: 1999–present
- Known for: Diriliş: Ertuğrul

Nurettin Sönmez (born November 23, 1978) is a Turkish actor and teacher. He is best known for his role as "Bamsı Beyrek" in historical series Diriliş: Ertuğrul.

== Early life ==
Sönmez was born on 23 November 1978 in Istanbul. He is a child of an immigrant family. His mother is an Albanian immigrant. His father, Ümit Sönmez, is a dentist. Nurettin Sönmez graduated from Istanbul University Mining Engineering Department. He then went to the Dialog Communication Acting School of Can and Arsen Gürzap and graduated from there. Later, he studied theatre at Yeditepe University.

== Career ==
Sönmez started his acting career in 1999 with the Akşam Güneşi series, in which he shared the lead role with Serdar Gökhan, Pelin Batu and Sumru Yavrucuk.

He started to attract attention with the character of Gaddar Ali, which he portrayed in the series Osmanlı'da Derin Devlet, published in 2013. Since 2014 he has become well known with the character of Bamsı Beyrek in the series Diriliş: Ertuğrul and its sequel Kuruluş: Osman.

Besides acting, Sönmez is also an instructor about Far East sports, providing training and seminars in Turkey and abroad.

== Filmography ==
=== Television ===
Key
†	Denotes series that have not yet been released

Year	Title	Role	Notes
1999	Akşam Güneşi	Unknown	Debut role
2011	Mavi Kelebekler	Branka Brekoviç	
2012	Bir Zamanlar Osmanlı	Gaddar Ali	
2013	Osmanlı'da Derin Devlet	Gaddar Ali	
2013	Tatar Ramazan	Ulvi	
2014–2019	Diriliş: Ertuğrul	Bamsı Beyrek	
2021	J. Fragrances: Defender	Defender	Adds of Defender Perfume
2019–2021	Kuruluş: Osman	Bamsı Beyrek	
2022	Sipahi	Kemal	

=== Film ===
Key
†	Denotes films that have not yet been released

Year	Title	Role	Notes
2022	Çakallarla Dans 6	Enrico	
