= Gaziler Sultanı Gidiyor =

- Kuruluş: Osman episode
- The funeral of Ertuğrul Bey. The death of Ertuğrul was met with mixed reception, with some expressing frustration and others giving a positive overview of the depiction of the character in Diriliş: Ertuğrul and Kuruluş: Osman.
- Episode no.: Season 2 Episode 12
- Directed by: Metin Günay
- Written by: Mehmet Bozdağ; Atilla Engin; Aslı Zeynep Peker Bozdağ; Rafet Elçi
- Original air date: 23 December 2020
- Running time: 2 hours, 41 minutes

Main cast
- Burak Özçivit as Osman Bey; Tamer Yiğit as Ertuğrul Bey; Kanbolat Görkem Arslan as Savcı Bey; Nurettin Sönmez as Bamsı Beyrek; Didem Balçın as Selcan Hatun; Ragıp Savaş as Dündar Bey

Episode chronology
← Previous "Büyük Devlet Olma Vakti"	Next → "Bey Osman"
- Kuruluş: Osman (season 2)

"Episode 39", less commonly known by its title "Gaziler Sultanı Gidiyor" (transl. "The Ghazis' Sultan is Leaving") is the 39th episode of the Turkish TV series Kuruluş: Osman. It has been noted for depicting the death of Ertuğrul Bey, the eponymous character in the series' predecessor, Diriliş: Ertuğrul (2014–2019). The episode stars Burak Özçivit as Osman Bey and Tamer Yiğit as Ertuğrul Bey.

"Episode 39" was released on 23 December 2020.

== Plot ==
After Ertuğrul Bey temporarily recovers from his boil illness, he resumes his duties as the Kayı Bey. Chiefly, he ponders over who to choose as his heir, deciding between his sons Savcı and Osman. Meanwhile, at a meeting, Osman goes against popular opinion to attack İnegöl and instead proposes to attack Aya Nikola's soldiers with the help of Targun Hatun. This, as well as observations of Osman's similarity to himself and consultations with his companions Bamsı and Abdurrahman, prompts Ertuğrul to choose him as his heir, although he decides to not announce this to allow Osman to be elected democratically. Ertuğrul remembers his close ones, including his father Süleyman Şah, his mother Hayme, his wife (Halime), his brothers Gündoğdu, Sungurtekin and Dündar, and his companions Turgut, Bamsı, Doğan and Abdurrahman, before dying at a council meeting, devastating his sons Gündüz, Savcı and Osman, and even his corrupted brother Dündar.

== Production ==
The season was written and produced by Mehmet Bozdağ and directed by Metin Günay. It was filmed in a plateau set in Riva, Beykoz.

Nurettin Sönmez, who portrays Bamsı in both Kuruluş: Osman and its predecessor Diriliş: Ertuğrul, said filming for the scene of Ertuğrul's death was "very difficult" and "full of emotion", saying he "had Engin Altan Düzyatan (Note: The actor who portrays Ertuğrul in Diriliş: Ertuğrul) and his Ertuğrul Gazi in [his] eyes".

== Reception ==
Ertuğrul's death was met with sadness in Pakistan, with fans 'mourning' the death of the character on social media platforms such as Twitter. The reaction of fans was mixed, with some expressing frustration over the character's death, and others praising the character's storyline and emphasising the importance of focusing more on the character of Osman. The death of Ertuğrul also led to renewed discussion of the performance of Tamer Yiğit, who replaced Engin Altan Düzyatan in portraying Ertuğrul.

== See also ==
- List of Diriliş: Ertuğrul episodes
- List of Kuruluş: Osman episodes
