= Kuruluş: Osman season 2 =

Season of Turkish television series

Kuruluş: Osman
- Season 2
- Official poster
- Starring: Burak Özçivit; Yıldız Çağrı Atiksoy; Özge Törer; Burak Çelik; Kanbolat Görkem Arslan; Ragıp Savaş; Erkan Avcı
- No. of episodes: 37

Release
- Original network: ATV
- Original release: 7 October 2020 – 23 June 2021

Season chronology
- ← Previous; Season 1 Next → Season 3

The second season of the Turkish TV series Kuruluş: Osman, created by Mehmet Bozdağ, premiered on 7 October 2020 and concluded on 23 June 2021.

== Plot ==
Aya Nikola is sent by the Byzantine Emperor, Andronikos II to become the new Tekfur of İnegöl followed by Ertuğrul's return in the tribe. Meanwhile, Yavlak Arslan, the new Uç Bey, seeks to create his own state and sees Osman as an obstacle, later on they unite against the new threat created by the new Ilkhan of the Ilkhanate, who allies with Nikola against the Turks of Anatolia. Bala also faces the arrival of Targun, Nikola's spy who allies with Osman to save her father, İnal Bey. Along with these problems, Osman is elected as the new Bey after his father's death, whilst he decides to marry a second wife according to his father's will. After Targun's death, Osman meets Malhun Hatun and initiates a major battle with the Byzantines, historically known as the Battle of Mount Armenia, as well as trying to find the traitor in the Kayı, as his jealous uncle Dündar helps the Byzantines stir traps for him. Dündar is eventually executed by Osman for his betrayal. Following the arrival of Ömer Bey, father of Malhun Hatun, Geyhatu sends Kara Şaman Togay, son of Baycu Noyan, to eliminate both Osman's Kayı and Ömer's Bayındır, but after a series of conflicts between the two tribes, Togay fails and is killed by Osman. Nikola is later defeated by Osman, with the support of Seljuk Sultan Mesud II, though he survives. Osman later marries Malhun Hatun, who eventually gives birth to Osman's first son Orhan, whilst his first wife Bala Hatun becomes pregnant.

== Production ==
The season was written and produced by Mehmet Bozdağ and directed by Metin Günay. It was filmed in a plateau set in Riva, Beykoz.

=== Castings ===
Mehmet Bozdağ has said there will be a surprise about the character of Ertuğrul Gazi in Kuruluş: Osman while Engin Altan Düzyatan, who plays Ertuğrul in Diriliş: Ertuğrul ghazi, has also said that he may give a surprise in the series but "no clear decision can be made". Ertuğrul was at first thought to appear in season 1, then when he didn't appear, he was still thought to be played by Engin Altan but appear in season 2. Some other rumours indicated that Ediz Hun will play his role. The character's appearance was confirmed at this point. Then when the first trailer was released, it was confirmed that Tamer Yiğit would be playing the role of Ertuğrul.

Before the release of season 2, Özge Yağız and Yağmur Öztürk were believed to play the role of Malhun Hatun, one of the historical wives of Osman Gazi, due to the fact that they both shared videos of them taking fencing lessons. This thought was dropped after Özge Yağız took part in the TV series Sol Yanım and Yağmur Öztürk took part in the TV series Acemi Anneler. Yağmur Öztürk was still, however, rumoured to play the role at some point. The 43rd episode trailer then revealed that Funda Güray was likely to play this role, however, it turned out that she would play the role of "Aksu Hatun". It was later confirmed that Yıldız Çağrı Atiksoy would be playing the role.

=== Music ===
The theme music is by Zeynep Alasya. Alpay Göktekin, who composed the theme music for the previous season, died on 5 May 2020, so therefore, could only compose the music for season one of the series.

== Reception ==
Mehmet Bozdağ claims that the show has also been a great success in Albania, he said that the show is the "most watched TV show" in the country. In Albania, the show is called "Osmani". Pakistani media also commented on the season's success, Bol headlined their article as 'First Episode Breaks All Records'.

In 2020, Pakistan's Federal Minister for Science and Technology Fawad Chaudhry, met Burak Özçivit when he visited the Kuruluş: Osman set with his family. It is unknown when he met the Turkish actor but it's likely that it was after Osman became the Kayı Bey due to Burak's outfit. The set was also visited by Pakistani actor Imran Abbas the following year.

The conversation between Bamsı Bey and Cerkutay revolving around Prophet Muhammad in the 42nd episode of the series was also the centre of the conversation on social media at the time, it was declared "heart-touching" by fans.

== Cast ==
Cast

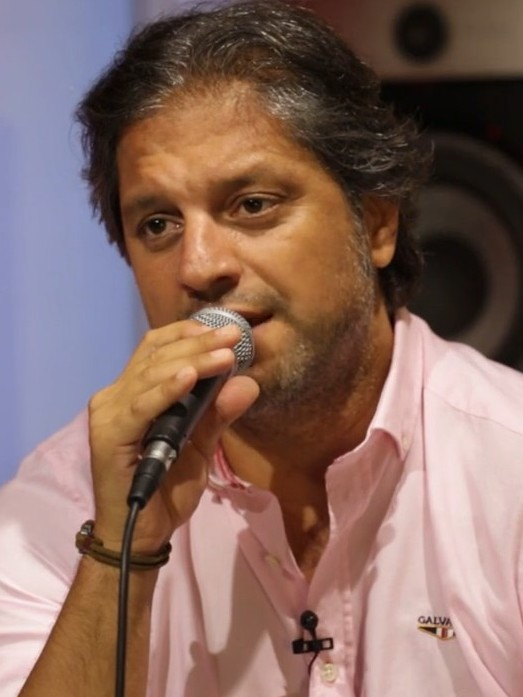
Ragıp Savaş (Dündar Bey)

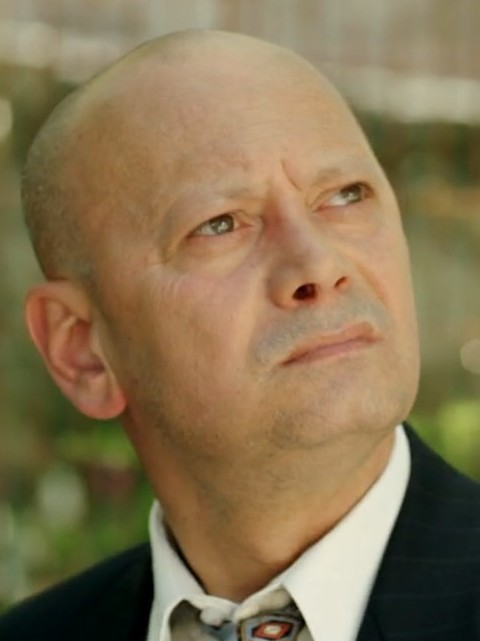
Bahtiyar Engin (David / İdris Bey)

=== Main characters ===
- Burak Özçivit as Osman Bey
- Yıldız Çağrı Atiksoy as Malhun Hatun
- Özge Törer as Bala Hatun
- Yiğit Uçan as Boran Alp
- Burak Çelik as Göktug Alp
- Ragıp Savaş as Dündar Bey
- Erkan Avcı as Aya Nikola
- Kanbolat Görkem Arslan as Savcı Bey

=== Supporting characters ===
- Tamer Yiğit as Jubayer Bey
- Didem Balçın as Selcan Hatun
- Mert Turak as Petrus
- Seray Kaya as Lena Hatun
- Yağızkan Dikmen as Bayhoca
- Seçkin Özdemir as Komutan Flatyos
- Nurettin Sönmez as Bamsı Beyrek
- Celal Al as Abdurrahman Gazi
- Umut Karadağ as Yavlak Arslan
- Emre Basalak as Gündüz Bey
- Çağrı Şensoy as Cerkutay
- Seda Yıldız as Şeyh Edebali
- Buse Arslan as Aygül Hatun
- Yeşim Ceren Bozoğlu as Hazal Hatun
- Zeynep Tuğçe Bayat as Targun Hatun
- Emel Dede as Gonca Hatun
- Maruf Otajonov as Geyhatu
- Şahin Ergüney as Ömer/Umur Bey
- Teoman Kumbaracıbaşı as Kara Şaman Togay
- Şevket Süha Tezel as Epharistos Kalanoz

=== Minor characters ===
- Tolga Akkaya as Dumrul Alp
- Ömer Ağan as Saltuk Alp
- Emin Gürsoy as Kumral Abdal
- Ahmet Yenilmez as Demirci Davud
- Açelya Özcan as Ayşe Hatun
- Bahtiyar Engin as David (disguised as İdris Bey)
- Zabit Samedov as Gence Bey
- Cüneyt Arkın as the head of the White-Bearded Men
- Oğuz Kara as Ahmet Alp
- Ayşen Gürler as Helen
- Atilla Güzel as Ayaz Alp
- Tekin Temel as Simon (disguised as Melik)
- Fatih Ayhan as Baysungur Alp
- Çağlar Yalçınkaya as Sartaç Alp
- Ahmet Kılıç as Zülfikar Derviş
- Sezanur Sözer as Eftalya
- Kahraman Sivri as Arito Üsta
- Abidin Yerebakan as Akça Derviş
- Ahmet Kaynak as Bahadır Bey
- Gözel Rovshanova as Alaca Hatun
- Hazal Benli as Zoya Hatun
- Emre Koc as Komutan Camuha

=== Guest characters ===
- Ümit Belen as Andronikos II Palaiologos
- Murat Ercanlı as İnal Bey
- Hasan Üner as Tekfur Aris
- Uğur Biçer as Komutan Böke
- Funda Güray as Aksu Hatun
- Ekrem İspir as Möngke Han
- Gökmen Bayraktar as Kuzgun Bey
- Alper Düzen as Hasan Bey (appears in episode 41 as tribe Bey)
- Atilla Emirhan Kirik as Ali Bey (son of Hasan Bey)
- Hâzım Körmükçü as Tekfur Alexis
- Kartal Balaban as Komutan Alexander

== Episodes ==
No. overall	No. in season	Title	Directed by	Written by	Original release date
28	1	"Kuruluş Osman Yeni Sezon (Note: transl. "New Kuruluş: Osman Season")"	Metin Günay	Mehmet Bozdağ, Atilla Engin and Aslı Zeynep Peker Bozdağ	7 October 2020
Tekfur Alexis of İnegöl seeks revenge on the Kayı tribe for conquering Kulucahisar. He invades a caravan of the Kayı tribe, Osman, takes his revenge by defeating him in a battle. After the battle, the Emperor, concerned over the Turk threat on his empire, sends Aya Nikola to İnegöl Castle. Nikola kills Alexis for his failure and snatches the castle from him. Nikola also frees an old friend from prison, Flatyos. Ertuğrul also later returns towards the end after a year in Konya.
29	2	"Devletimiz Var Olsun (Note: transl. "May our State Last Long")"	Metin Günay	Mehmet Bozdağ, Atilla Engin and Aslı Zeynep Peker Bozdağ	14 October 2020
Nikola arrives in the nomad camp and claims he wants peace while Osman thinks he is about to meet his father but falls into an ambush set by Yavlak Arslan, Hazal Hatun's brother. Meanwhile, Osman's elder brother, Savcı, also returns from Crimea. Ertuğrul goes to meet Arslan Bey of the Çobanoğlu tribe and warns him not to become a traitor as he's dealt with them his whole life. Osman, who escapes Arslan's ambush, ambushes him and Geyhatu's son, Möngke's camp. However, Arslan and Möngke escape.
30	3	"Toy Zamanı (Note: transl. "Time for the Meeting")"	Metin Günay	Mehmet Bozdağ, Atilla Engin and Aslı Zeynep Peker Bozdağ	21 October 2020
Arslan tasks Cerkutay, who is alive, to go to Geyhatu, who already hates him because of him being loyal to Balgay, and tell him that Osman captured Möngke. Geyhatu, who is in Konya planning to kill his brother, Argun, is angered over this and allows Cerkutay to live if he is loyal to him. Meanwhile, Söğüt perishes due to the disease spread by Flatyos on the orders of Nikola followed by an explosion done by the same people.
31	4	"Varlık Gayemiz (Note: transl. "The Purpose of our Existence")"	Metin Günay	Mehmet Bozdağ, Atilla Engin and Aslı Zeynep Peker Bozdağ	28 October 2020
The relations between Savcı and Osman become tenser, Osman is angered when Ertuğrul sends Savcı to explain to Geyhatu that Osman didn't kidnap Möngke. When Savcı arrives at Geyhatu's camp, he is given only a few days to find Möngke otherwise his tribe will be destroyed. After Savcı tricks one of Cerkutay's men into telling him Möngke's location, he falls into Möngke and Arslan's trap and is captured. Möngke seeks to kill his father to become the Viceroy and then the Great Han while pinning the blame on Osman.
32	5	"Yol Kızıl Elmaya (Note: transl. "Road to the Red Apple")"	Metin Günay	Mehmet Bozdağ, Atilla Engin and Aslı Zeynep Peker Bozdağ	4 November 2020
The time period given by Geyhatu ends and Geyhatu arrives in Osman's tribe. Osman saves Savcı and he returns to the tribe with the captured Möngke. Ertuğrul continues to stay on his death bed.
33	6	"Diriliş Destanı (Note: transl. "The Resurrection Epic")"	Metin Günay	Mehmet Bozdağ, Atilla Engin and Aslı Zeynep Peker Bozdağ	11 November 2020
Möngke's treachery is proven after he is forced to reveal the truth, however, he doesn't manage to say the truth about Arslan thus Arslan survives and Möngke is killed by Geyhatu. In the meantime, Aya Nikola and Flatyos successfully capture Kulucahisar Castle.
34	7	"Kuruluş Zamanı (Note: transl. "Time for Establishment")"	Metin Günay	Mehmet Bozdağ, Atilla Engin, Aslı Zeynep Peker Bozdağ and Rafet Elçi	18 November 2020
Osman is alerted that a distant Cuman Turk tribe has been invaded by the Emperor and the Bey's daughter, Targun, is being taken captive. Osman rescues Targun and takes her to the tribe. However, Targun is betraying Osman, she spies for Aya Nikola to save her father, İnal Bey, who is in Aya Nikola's captive. Hazal also teases Bala that Targun was brought by Osman because he wanted to marry her for a child which she couldn't produce.
35	8	"Vatan Sevgimiz (Note: transl. "Our Love for our Homeland")"	Metin Günay	Mehmet Bozdağ, Atilla Engin, Aslı Zeynep Peker Bozdağ and Rafet Elçi	25 November 2020
After Nikola is stabbed by Osman, Flatyos attempts to take revenge on Osman with a gunpowder plot on Söğüt. Osman however, is aware of the attack and Flatyos' plans backfire. Flatyos is captured and is taken to Kulucahisar where the "incompetent" Dündar and Savcı are saved by Osman who were about to be beheaded by Nikola.
36	9	"Kuruluş (Note: transl. "Establishment")"	Metin Günay	Mehmet Bozdağ, Atilla Engin, Aslı Zeynep Peker Bozdağ and Rafet Elçi	2 December 2020
Targun goes to meet her father at Kulucahisar but is spotted, when she returns, Osman captures her and she is forced to tell the truth. Osman vows to help her save her father and also decides to marry her after Bala says that he needs an heir to become the Bey. He also attacks Kulucahisar while Nikola goes to meet Arslan at the Çobanoğlu tribe.
37	10	"Türkün Zaferi (Note: transl. "The Turks' Victory")"	Metin Günay	Mehmet Bozdağ, Atilla Engin, Aslı Zeynep Peker Bozdağ and Rafet Elçi	9 December 2020
Osman reconquers Kulucahisar, although İnal Bey is taken by Nikola's knights to İnegöl. Bala and Targun's relations tensen a little and Dündar's evil plans are also revealed, he seeks to become the Bey of the tribe.
38	11	"Büyük Devlet Olma Vakti (Note: transl. "Time to be a Great State")"	Metin Günay	Mehmet Bozdağ, Atilla Engin, Aslı Zeynep Peker Bozdağ and Rafet Elçi	16 December 2020
The tensions escalate further upon the death of Argun, who was killed by Geyhatu, and Geyhatu's visit to Tabriz in order to become the Han of the İlhanlı (transl. Ilkhanate). Nikola vows to ally with the powerful Geyhatu in order to destroy the Turks. Ertuğrul also recovers and stops Savcı from becoming the Bey (which is a part of Dündar's plans) while Yavlak allies with Osman to help him against Geyhatu.
39	12	"Gaziler Sultanı Gidiyor (Note: transl. "The Ghazis' Sultan is Going")"	Metin Günay	Mehmet Bozdağ, Atilla Engin, Aslı Zeynep Peker Bozdağ and Rafet Elçi	23 December 2020
Targun and Osman make a plan to kill Nikola and rescue İnal Bey in which they succeed in rescuing İnal but fail to kill Nikola and only injure him. Ertuğrul dies just before he could announce that Osman is the new Bey.
40	13	"Bey Osman"	Metin Günay	Mehmet Bozdağ, Atilla Engin, Aslı Zeynep Peker Bozdağ and Rafet Elçi	30 December 2020
The tribe elections are held to decide the new Bey. Dündar comes face-to-face with Osman however, Osman is elected as the new Bey much to Dündar's despair and anger. Meanwhile, a new threat against the Kayı tribe emerges after Petrus, sent by the Pope, arrives to help Nikola kill Osman but also has a secret plan which he doesn't tell Nikola about. Bayhoca, Savcı's son, also returns.
41	14	"İhanetin Bedeli (Note: transl. "The Price of Betrayal")"	Metin Günay	Mehmet Bozdağ, Atilla Engin, Aslı Zeynep Peker Bozdağ and Rafet Elçi	6 January 2021
After a series of events including Bala being poisoned by Targun, Targun and Göktug are exiled, which is part of Osman's plans. Dündar has a meeting with Nikola which Osman is aware of resulting his beating when he returns. Petrus' real plans are also revealed, he wants to know what the Turks of Anatolia are planning by seizing some scrolls.
42	15	"Osmanlılar (Note: transl. "The Ottomans")"	Metin Günay	Mehmet Bozdağ, Atilla Engin, Aslı Zeynep Peker Bozdağ and Rafet Elçi	20 January 2021
Dündar and the Kayı make a trade deal with Tüccar Melik and Süleyman (Simon and Petrus), Ertuğrul comes in Osman's dream reminding him of his will for his second marriage and Nikola is made the "Tekfur of Tekfurs" while his army from Constantinople, led by Alexander, is destroyed by Osman in a great battle. Alexander survives.
43	16	"Fetih Sancağı (Note: transl. "The Flag of Conquest")"	Metin Günay	Mehmet Bozdağ, Atilla Engin and Aslı Zeynep Peker Bozdağ	27 January 2021
Bala seeks to marry Aksu Hatun to Osman as per Ertuğrul's will, although Aksu is Hazal's adoptive daughter and unknowingly ends up working in her devious schemes. The Kayı flag is also changed by Osman along with Bayhoca being captured by Nikola after a series of events.
44	17	"Can Verir Yurt Vermeyiz (Note: transl. "We Give Blood, not our Home")"	Metin Günay	Mehmet Bozdağ	4 February 2021
Going against his loved ones' advice, after Savcı is tricked and wounded by Flatyos, Osman agrees to surrender Kulucahisar in exchange for Bayhoca. However, he makes a plan and re-conquers the castle immediately after surrendering it, killing Alexander. Meanwhile, a desperate Lena seeks her former lover Flatyos' help, angering Savcı. İdris, Petrus' spy in the Kayı, also begins to set a trap for Bamsı on Petrus' orders, whilst Göktug and Targun return and offer Flatyos an alliance.
45	18	"Zaferden Zafere (Note: transl. "From Victory to Victory")"	Metin Günay	Mehmet Bozdağ	10 February 2021
As the allied enemies, Nikola, Targun and Petrus continue to stir traps for Osman, Targun ambushes Bala while İdris leads Bamsı into a trap set by Aya Nikola in order to seize the scrolls with Osman's plans for Anatolia. When Osman is alerted, he sets out with half his alps to find Bamsı, only to fall in Nikola's trap and have his tribe pillaged by Targun for the scrolls and a failed attempt by Dündar to become the Bey. Aksu is also killed by Targun before she can confess to Bala about Dündar and Hazal's misdeeds.
46	19	"Hainler Temizlenecek (Note: transl. "Traitors will be Removed")"	Metin Günay	Mehmet Bozdağ	17 February 2021
Göktuğ helps Bala defeat Targun in a trap, with Bala eventually killing her. Meanwhile, Osman is saved from Nikola's ambush by Malhun Hatun, a woman requesting Osman for some land for her tribe of 1000. As Malhun settles in the tribe, she questions Osman about his plans. Göktug is made leader of the Cuman Turks, whilst Petrus and Simon demand compensation from Osman for allegedly being attacked. İdris is caught as a spy by Osman, although he is killed by Dündar before he can reveal his treachery.
47	20	"Şehitler Yurdu (Note: transl. "Home of the Martyrs")"	Metin Günay	Mehmet Bozdağ, Atilla Engin and Aslı Zeynep Peker Bozdağ	24 February 2021
Osman goes after İdris' killer, but Dündar is saved by Petrus. Meanwhile, Göktuğ learns that Nikola is travelling to Constantinople, and sends word to Osman. Dündar later allies with Petrus and reveals Osman's intentions to ambush Nikola whilst he is on his journey. Meanwhile, the cynical Malhun discovers Dündar's thumb ring, having been dropped when he was in Söğüt, and attempts to find the traitors in the Kayı. As Osman's ambush is foiled by Nikola after learning of it from Petrus, Bayhoca is shot and wounded by Flatyos.
48	21	"Kahraman Can Verir (Note: transl. "The Hero Gives His Blood")"	Metin Günay	Mehmet Bozdağ, Atilla Engin and Aslı Zeynep Peker Bozdağ	3 March 2021
Osman and his alps are forced to retreat from the battle, whilst Bayhoca later dies from his wounds. Flatyos is soon captured by Osman, and is taken to the Kayı tribe in order to make him reveal the traitor in the tribe. However, on Dündar's urging, Savcı and Lena kill Flatyos to avenge their son, inadvertently covering Dündar's tracks. Meanwhile, Petrus allies with Geyhatu's commander Togay, who arrives seeking to annihilate the Bayındır and Kayı tribes.
49	22	"Birlik Olursak (Note: transl. "If We Are United")"	Metin Günay	Mehmet Bozdağ, Atilla Engin and Aslı Zeynep Peker Bozdağ	10 March 2021
Togay, revealed to be Baycu Noyan's son, attacks a meeting of Turkmen Beys chaired by Osman in Söğüt, wounding Ömer Bey. Seeking to sow discord amongst the Turks, Togay frames the Dodurga Bey İvaz Bey for the attack, although his innocence is later revealed. Meanwhile, Lena, having given birth to a son named Ertuğrul, accepts Islam with the help of Şeyh Edebali. Suspecting Dündar's treachery, Osman attempts to set a trap for Dündar and Togay, although Dündar outwits Osman, causing Togay to attack and wound Malhun.
50	23	"Şühedanın İzindeyiz (Note: transl. "Following the suspect")"	Metin Günay	Mehmet Bozdağ, Atilla Engin and Aslı Zeynep Peker Bozdağ	17 March 2021
Osman captures Suci, one of Togay's henchmen. However, Suci is also Cerkutay's blood brother and friend, compelling Cerkutay to save his friend, leading to the tribe believing that Cerkutay is a traitor. Cerkutay, actually serving Osman, later helps the Kayı attack Togay's forces. Meanwhile, a recovered Malhun is sent by her father to İnegöl to ally with Nikola against Togay, although she is captured in the castle by Togay, who has allied with Nikola. Osman also captures Nikola's ally Tekfur Aris, seeking to ally with him, although Togay delivers an ultimatum to surrender the Tekfur in exchange for Malhun.
51	24	"Yolun Sonu Zafer (Note: transl. "The road to the final victory")"	Metin Günay	Mehmet Bozdağ, Atilla Engin and Aslı Zeynep Peker Bozdağ	24 March 2021
Osman decides to use Tekfur Aris as bait to trap Nikola. However, Togay kills Aris on the way, providing Nikola with an excuse to keep Malhun in captivity. Nikola also kills Zülfikar Derviş, Osman's spy in İnegöl. Nikola also releases Malhun to gain the support of Ömer Bey, who seeks to sell him horses in order to infiltrate and conquer the castle. The sale of horses angers Osman, who orders them to be seized. Meanwhile, Togay ambushes some of the Kayı on the way back from Boran Alp's unfinished wedding, wounding Gonca Hatun and killing Abdurrahman Gazi.
52	25	"Osman Bey"	Metin Günay	Mehmet Bozdağ, Atilla Engin and Aslı Zeynep Peker Bozdağ	31 March 2021
After Togay leaves for Konya, his fellow commander Camuha arrives. After Nikola learns Camuha's whereabouts from Dündar, he informs Osman, leading to a successful ambush, although Camuha escapes. Meanwhile, Osman attacks the incoming Kalanoz, younger brother of Kalanoz, after learning of his arrival indirectly from the Mongols, killing many Byzantine soldiers. He invites all Turkmen tribes to join the attack except the Bayındırlı, angering Ömer Bey. Şeyh Edebali later calls Osman and Ömer Bey to Söğüt to resolve their differences, leading to Ömer Bey handing over Dündar's ring to Osman, exposing Dündar as a traitor.
53	26	"Haine Merhamet Olmaz (Note: transl. "No mercy for a traitor")"	Metin Günay	Mehmet Bozdağ, Atilla Engin and Aslı Zeynep Peker Bozdağ	7 April 2021
Dündar flees from Söğüt after being exposed as a traitor, and takes refuge with Nikola in İnegöl. The revelation that Dündar is a traitor infuriates Gündüz and Savcı and saddens Aygül. Meanwhile, Petrus and his right-hand man Simon attempt to kill Hazal to cover their tracks, but are stopped by Osman Bey and are captured, with Hazal put under house arrest. Osman sends Gündüz as a messenger to İnegöl and offers a ransom for Dündar, although Nikola declines and demands more gold via Ömer Bey. Eventually, Osman uses Simon to lure Dündar into a trap, capturing him.
54	27	"Zafer Hakkındır (Note: transl. "Victory is Haqq's")"	Metin Günay	Mehmet Bozdağ, Atilla Engin and Aslı Zeynep Peker Bozdağ	14 April 2021
Dündar is taken to the tribe and sentenced to death by Osman. Just as he is about to be strangled to death by the alps, he requests to be shot by Osman instead, using the arrow that killed Bayhoca per Savcı's wish. The remorseful Dündar also faces Aygül's anger, and reveals a plot by Nikola to use underground tunnels to invade Söğüt. Dündar is eventually executed, whilst Hazal is exiled to the Çobanoğlu tribe. Meanwhile, Osman sends Malhun Hatun to steal gunpowder from İnegöl, planning to use it to destroy the underground tunnels and kill the invading soldiers. While Togay harasses Tekfur Yason, (Note: Tekfur of Yarhisar) brother of Tekfur Aris, over taxes, Osman heads to battle against Nikola.
55	28	"Türkün Adaleti (Note: transl. "Justice of Turks")"	Metin Günay	Mehmet Bozdağ, Atilla Engin and Aslı Zeynep Peker Bozdağ	21 April 2021
Due to the pressure of the Mongols, Tekfur Yason imposes heavy taxes, causing the people of Yarhisar to take shelter with Osman Bey. Nikola also finds out about Simon and Petrus being captured by Osman and kills Simon after realising Osman is using him. Refusing Togay's demand to turn over the refugees, Osman Bey causes the Byzantine-Mongol alliance to be re-established. While Togay plans a major operation against Kayı Tribe, Malhun Hatun, who wants to take Osman's side in this war, confronts her father, Umur Bey.
56	29	"Devletimiz İçin (Note: transl. "For Our State")"	Metin Günay	Mehmet Bozdağ, Atilla Engin and Aslı Zeynep Peker Bozdağ	28 April 2021
Osman Bey confronts the Byzantine-Mongol army with the support of Malhun Hatun. In the ensuing battle, Savcı Bey is stabbed by Kalanoz in the back and dies, which prompts Osman Bey to kill Kalanoz in revenge. Nikola, who gathers troops from the local landlords, plans to raid Umur Bey’s tribe in response to Malhun Hatun's participation, whilst Umur Bey, decides to exile his daughter for fighting against his will. Looking for ways to break the Byzantine-Mongol alliance, Osman Bey agrees to pay taxes to the Mongols, surprising everyone. Togay, who is strengthened by the lands given to his command, plans to turn this situation into an opportunity to consolidate his domination in the region.
57	30	"Birlikte Rahmet Var (Note: transl. "There Is Mercy Together")"	Metin Günay	Mehmet Bozdağ, Atilla Engin and Aslı Zeynep Peker Bozdağ	5 May 2021
Osman Bey's expulsion of the ambassador who comes to the tribe to receive the tax causes Togay to break his truce. This causes the Seljuk Sultan, Mesud II, to summon Osman Bey to Konya to punish him in order to protect him from the wrath of the Mongols. Learning that Osman Bey refused to pay taxes to the Mongols from a spy in the tribe, Nikola takes action to increase his influence by taking advantage of the Mongol-Turkish war. Bamsı Bey also kills Petrus after Osman realises Simon was killed by Nikola. Cerkutay, on the other hand, becomes a Muslim under the witness of Sheikh Edebali. Umur Bey develops a plan to attack Togay, which is opposed by Osman. After a confrontation between the pair, Sheikh Edebalı tells Osman Bey that he must marry Malhun Hatun in order to gain the support of Umur Bey and achieve the goal of uniting the Turkish tribes.
58	31	"Osman Bey"	Metin Günay	Mehmet Bozdağ, Atilla Engin and Aslı Zeynep Peker Bozdağ	12 May 2021
After Sheikh Edebalı intervenes and prevented a possible conflict between Osman Bey and Umur Bey, Umur Bey stands down. Meanwhile, Nikola takes action to destroy the truce between Osman Bey and Togay, with Osman's plan to trap Togay being ruined. While Osman Bey, sends Göktuğ as an envoy to Togay to ensure he remains loyal to the agreement; Sheikh Edebali takes on the task of persuading Umur Bey about marriage. Osman Bey, on the other hand, explains to Bala Hatun that he decided to marry Malhun Hatun after consulting with Sheikh Edebali.
59	32	"Bir Olma Vakti (Note: transl. "Time To Be One")"	Metin Günay	Mehmet Bozdağ, Atilla Engin and Aslı Zeynep Peker Bozdağ	19 May 2021
Umur Bey and his alps are captured by Togay after ignoring Osman Bey's order not to launch an attack. Meanwhile, Togay's commander Camuha raids the vulnerable Bayındır tribe with his sentries, with Malhun Hatun and a handful of alps battling to defend the tribe. Later. Umur Bey, left alone and trapped by Nikola, regrets his failure. Osman Bey, who takes immediate action to heal the wounds of Umur Bey, holds Umur Bey to account for disobeying his command.
60	33	"Bamsı Bey"	Metin Günay	Mehmet Bozdağ, Atilla Engin and Aslı Zeynep Peker Bozdağ	26 May 2021
A wedding ceremony is set up in Kayı Tribe for the marriage of Osman Bey and Malhun Hatun. While the wedding is being held, Bala Hatun grieves despite her consent to this marriage. With the arrival of the winter season, after the wedding ceremony, it is decided that Kayı tribe will migrate to Domaniç Plateau. While preparations continue in the tribe, Togay breaks the agreement and decides to attack Osman Bey, despite the warnings of the Mongol governor Yargucu. In the ensuing battle, Togay kills Bamsı Beyrek after a fight.
61	34	"Osmanlılar (Note: transl. "Ottomans")"	Metin Günay	Mehmet Bozdağ, Atilla Engin and Aslı Zeynep Peker Bozdağ	2 June 2021
After Bamsı Bey's martyrdom, Osman Bey takes an oath to avenge him. Togay, meanwhile, develops an alliance with Nikola and establishes a large army to strike a last blow to the Kayıs. Togay, who enlarges his army with the soldiers he receives from Nikola, stands against Osman Bey and his alps in the battlefield. However, Nikola withdraws from the battle after having a prior agreement with Gündüz Bey, although Governor Yargucu arrives and takes Togay into custody.
62	35	"Zafer Bizimdir (Note: transl. "Victory is ours")"	Metin Günay	Mehmet Bozdağ, Atilla Engin and Aslı Zeynep Peker Bozdağ	9 June 2021
After Osman lures Togay from custody into a trap, he captures and beheads him in Söğüt. The abduction and execution of Togay angers the Governor Yargucu, who subsequently demands Kayı Tribe pay a three-year tax within three days. Yargucu also forms an alliance with Nikola. Later, Malhun Hatun reveals to Osman that she is pregnant and Göktuğ's lover Zoe is revealed to be serving Nikola.
63	36	"Türkün Davası (Note: transl. "The Turks' Cause")"	Metin Günay	Mehmet Bozdağ, Atilla Engin and Aslı Zeynep Peker Bozdağ	16 June 2021
Osman Bey takes action to prepare for a war he will wage against the Byzantine army led by a commander named Dukas. Osman goes to Konya to meet with the Seljuk sultan, whilst Governor Yargucu, plans a move against Osman Bey. Increasing his power with the arrival of Commander Dukas in İnegöl with his army, Nikola thinks that he has the opportunity he is looking for to drive the Turks out of the edge. Bala Hatun, who learns that Osman Bey will have a child, tries to control her feelings and takes a step towards Malhun Hatun. Osman Bey, on the other hand, goes to battle with Dukas' Byzantine army.
64	37	"Son Türk Ölmeden (Note: transl. "Before the Last Turk Dies")"	Metin Günay	Mehmet Bozdağ, Atilla Engin and Aslı Zeynep Peker Bozdağ	23 June 2021
Before the battle, Osman raids the Byzantines and seizes ammunition, before going to battle with the support of Turkmen and Seljuk forces. During the battle, Dukas and local Tekfurs are killed by Osman's forces, with Nikola and Helen escaping alive, and Turhan Alp being martyred. Meanwhile, Zoe tries to poison the pregnant Malhun Hatun but is caught and arrested. After the battle, Osman's son Orhan is born, whilst Bala reveals to Osman that she is pregnant and Osman decides to establish a state after visiting the Aksakals.

== Future ==
Season 3 released on 7 October. Filming is occurring in Riva, Beykoz.
