= Ertuğrul Bey (character) =

Ertuğrul ghazi
- Diriliş: Ertuğrul character Kuruluş: Osman character
- Engin Altan Düzyatan as Ertuğrul in Diriliş: Ertuğrul
- First appearance: "Pilot" (Diriliş: Ertuğrul) (2014)
- Last appearance: "Gaziler Sultanı Gidiyor" (Kuruluş: Osman) (2021)
- Based on: Ertuğrul
- Adapted by: Mehmet Bozdağ
- Portrayed by: Engin Altan Düzyatan (Diriliş: Ertuğrul); Tamer Yiğit (Kuruluş: Osman)

In-universe information
- Full name: Süleyman Şah oğlu Ertuğrul Bey (Note: transl. Ertuğrul Bey, son of Süleyman Şah)
- Alias: Ertuğrul Gazi (in Kuruluş: Osman)
- Position: Bey; Uç Bey (Note: Similar to a margrave or an Emir.); Alpbaşı (transl. Chief Alp)
- Affiliation: Kayı tribe; Sultanate of Rum; Aksakals (Note: also known as the "White Beards".)
- Family: Süleyman Şah (father); Hayme Ana (mother); Sungurtekin Bey (brother); Dündar Bey (brother); Gündoğdu Bey (half-brother); Selcan Hatun (adoptive sister/sister-in-law); Gökçe Hatun (adoptive sister); Malhun Hatun (daughter-in-law); Bala Hatun (daughter-in-law); Ayşe Hatun (daughter-in-law); Lena Hatun (daughter-in-law); Turgut Alp (adoptive brother); Bamsı Beyrek (adoptive brother); Doğan Alp (adoptive brother)
- Spouses: Halime Hatun; İlbilge Hatun
- Children: Gündüz Bey (son); Savcı Bey (son); Osman Bey (son)
- Religion: Islam
- Ethnicity: Oğuz Turkish

Ertuğrul Bey is the main protagonist in the Turkish television series Diriliş: Ertuğrul, portrayed by Engin Altan Düzyatan. He also appears in the sequel, Kuruluş: Osman, where he is played by Tamer Yiğit and is referred to as Ertuğrul Gazi. The character is based on Ertuğrul, the father of Osman I.

== Background ==
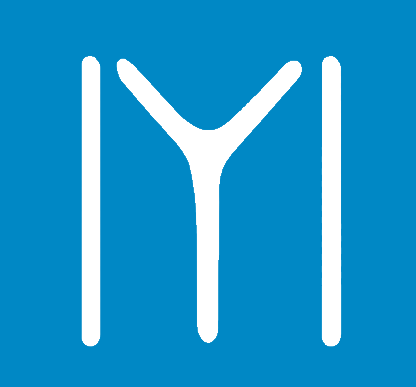
Flag of the Kayı tribe

Ertuğrul was born as the third son of Süleyman Şah and the second biological son of Hayme Hatun. He was originally looked after by his uncle, Korkut Bey, when his father was fighting in a war. As a youngster, he found three orphaned boys in a forest, Turgut Alp, Bamsı Beyrek and Doğan Alp, bringing them to the tribe and growing up with them as adoptive brothers. Ertuğrul had a taste of tragedy early in his life as his brother Sungurtekin Bey was captured by Mongols and presumed dead, not to return for many years. Growing up, he was the subject of romantic affection from his adoptive sister Gökçe, before rescuing a Selçuk princess, Halime, from Templars while out on a hunt.

=== Personality ===
Ertuğrul's official character description on the TRT 1 website states; "The son of Suleyman Shah, Ertugrul is a brave warrior who fights for his dreams and ideals. The show presents Ertugrul as fearless and righteous giving him a reputation amongst many tribes. He is the protector of the oppressed, willing to sacrifice his life for the cause of justice."

== Storyline ==
=== Season 1 ===
Süleyman Şah, Bey of the Kayı sends his son, Ertuğrul, to ask for land from the Emir of Aleppo. This is made almost impossible when the Kayı are put in a series of problems with the Templars after saving Şehzade Numan, Halime Sultan, and Şehzade Yiğit because of the traitor in the Emir's palace, Nasır, who works for the Templars but is later killed by Ertuğrul and the truth is shown to the Emir, with Ertuğrul having to stay hidden for days as a fugitive in Aleppo to show this. Ertuğrul also rids the tribe of his devious uncle, Kurdoğlu, Süleyman Şah's blood brother, after initially struggling to convince his father and his brother Gündoğdu of his evil. Ertuğrul, who loves Halime, marries her after much difficulty, including rivalry with El Aziz. Selcan's husband, Gündoğdu becomes jealous of his brother Ertuğrul as he is respected as the tribe hero but gradually calms down. Towards the end of the season, Kurdoğlu is beheaded by Ertuğrul , Ertuğrul successfully defeats the Templars and captures their castle, being nominated as Chief Alp in his father's will. This is followed by Süleyman Şah's death, much to Ertuğrul's sorrow, and the tribe's migration to Erzurum as part of Süleyman Şah's will before he died.

=== Season 2 ===
Ertuğrul faces the Mongols, led by Baycu Noyan, who destroyed nearly his entire tribe. After Ertuğrul is captured and has his hand nailed by Noyan, when he escapes, he finds his tribe settled with his uncle Korkut of Dodurga. Due to his hand injury, the council Beys of both tribes, including Korkut, Hayme and Gündoğdu, select Ertuğrul’s cousin Tuğtekin as Chief Alp of both tribes, overriding Süleyman Şah’s will and angering Ertuğrul. As Ertuğrul’s alp Abdurrahman is falsely accused by the Dodurgas of treachery and is imprisoned. Ertuğrul, with the help of Artuk Bey, the only Dodurga to support him, breaks him out. Hayme, under pressure from the Dodurgas, exiles Ertuğrul for this. Whilst in exile, Ertuğrul learns his brother Sungurtekin is alive. Meanwhile, Korkut Bey’s brother-in-law, Gümüştekin, arrives and slanders Ertuğrul with various charges, sentencing him to death in a show trial, before Ertuğrul is saved by his alps. Gümüştekin later has Korkut Bey poisoned to death, and is only caught and executed after Ertuğrul convinces the new Dodurga Bey Tuğtekin of his evil, with the help of Sungurtekin, having returned to the tribe. Meanwhile, Halime prematurely gives birth to Ertuğrul’s first son Gündüz, while Noyan is thought-killed by Ertuğrul. As Ertuğrul refuses to accept Gündoğdu as the new Bey, he forms a breakaway tribe, migrating to the western border of the Selçuk state with various members of his family, Artuk Bey, a group of alps and 400 others.

=== Season 3 ===
After migrating to the west and becoming the Bey, Ertuğrul faces Ural of the rich Çavdar trade-veterans. Although Ural isn't the Bey of his tribe, he seeks more and more power, becoming jealous of Ertuğrul for his bravery and closeness to the Sultan. Meanwhile, the Templars who have infiltrated Hanlı Pazar, led by Hancı Simon, seek to kill Ertuğrul as he did to the Templars years back. Ertuğrul defeats Hancı Simon and conquers Hanlı Pazar, leaving Ural more jealous than ever. However, Ural is soon accused of killing the Tekfur of Karacahisar and killing Ertuğrul’s alps and is sentenced to death, although he is saved by the devious Emir Sadettin with the support of Ural’s sister Aslıhan, who holds a grudge against Ertuğrul for declining to marry her. After the death of his father Candar Bey, Ural seeks help from the new Tekfur of Karacahisar, Vasilius, who wants to rid the Turks of the land, but Ural is killed by Ertuğrul, with the help of Ural’s noble brother Aliyar, in their struggle to punish the oppressor and stop his oppression, later he becomes the Bey of the Çavdar. After Vasilius kills Aliyar and Ertuğrul’s adoptive brother Doğan Alp, he is killed by a vengeful Ertuğrul. With Ertuğrul’s second son Savcı Bey being born, the Sultan makes Ertuğrul the Uç Bey angering Emir Sadettin who vows to end Ertuğrul, unsuccessfully framing him for poisoning the Sultan. At the end of the season, Ertuğrul falls into an ambush set by the new Tekfur of Karacahisar, Ares.

=== Season 4 ===
After being ambushed and wounded by Ares, it is believed that Ertuğrul is dead despite him actually being captured by some slave traders. After Ertuğrul escapes the slave traders and learns that Ares was his attacker, he returns to the Kayı tribe and exiles his brother Dündar for trying to sell Hanlı Pazar and leave the Byzantine border in his absence. After Ertuğrul's son, Gündüz, is kidnapped by Ares, Ertuğrul rescues him and declares war against Karacahisar and is successful in conquering it. Following Ares' capture, Ertuğrul takes him to the Sultan and tells him to confess to the Sultan about Sadettin Köpek's misdeeds. The plan nearly works but Köpek is saved by the Sultan's wife, Mahperi, and leads to an event turning Ares into a Muslim and an ally of Ertuğrul. Meanwhile, Ertuğrul's brother Sungurtekin returns, helping him against Köpek’s schemes, while the Sultan is poisoned to death by Köpek, with Köpek framing Ertuğrul for his murder. After Ertuğrul is absolved of the murder, he allies with the new Sultan, Gıyaseddın, and defeats Köpek’s treachery, eventually beheading him. Following this, Ertuğrul faces the return of his old enemy Noyan, who kills Ahmet Alp (formerly Ares), but is successful in defeating him and his devious sister, Alangoya, who attempted to kill Ertuğrul's newborn son, Osman. Halime dies giving birth to Osman, devastating Ertuğrul greatly, and briefly leaving Ertuğrul without milk for his son. At the end of the season, Ertuğrul leads the Kayıs to migrate to Söğüt.

=== Season 5 ===
In a Mongol-controlled Selçuk state, Ertuğrul faces many Mongol enemies including Alıncak and Arikbuka, along with the Selçuk assassin working with the Mongols, Beybolat. Beybolat is disguised with the name 'Albastı' and he arrives to cause chaos for Ertuğrul and his comrades, persecuting Ertuğrul’s returned brother Gündoğdu together with Alıncak. Beybolat causes many problems for Ertuğrul, including taking Ertuğrul’s control over Söğüt for a while, and murdering his nephew Süleyman Alp, son of Gündoğdu. A Byzantine commander, Dragos, also causes problems for Ertuğrul after taking over Lefke Castle, not letting him know who he even is. İlbilge, Beybolat's sister, becomes the only person in her family supporting justice and allies with Ertuğrul against Beybolat, Dragos and the Mongols, helping him defeat them. Following Beybolat's death, Ertuğrul faces Arikbuka, a feared Mongol spy and Alıncak's blood brother, who serves Hulagu Han. Meanwhile, Ertuğrul allies with Berke Han, Hulagu’s cousin and the Han of the Golden Horde. Meanwhile, Ertuğrul and a wiser Gündoğdu plan together to start a war between Berke and Hulagu. The season ends with the death of Arikbuka along with Ertuğrul's marriage to İlbilge Hatun.

=== In Kuruluş: Osman ===
In the first season of Kuruluş: Osman, he is only mentioned, mostly by Abdurrahman Gazi, said to be very ill. He also leaves his Beylik in the hands of his brother Dündar, fulfilling the promise he gave of a bigger duty when he first exiled him. However, this leads to chaos and division in the tribe, with Dündar constantly being fooled by Alişar Bey and the Margarit Monks. When he returns in the second season, following the offscreen deaths of his mother Hayme and half-brother Gündoğdu, and the presumed deaths of his wife İlbilge and brother Sungurtekin, Dündar is exiled to Söğüt for a while and Ertuğrul faces his younger brother-in-law and "son" Yavlak Arslan, who attempts to take over Söğüt but later repents and allies with Ertuğrul's son Osman. Ertuğrul also faces Tekfur Aya Nikola of İnegöl, before he becomes severely unwell, which leads to rivalry between his sons and brother, before Ertuğrul’s death in "Gaziler Sultanı Gidiyor". He also leaves plans for his son Osman to continue his legacy as Bey, including leaving a will for him to marry a second wife.

== Positions ==
Ertuğrul was appointed as the Alpbaşı, leader of the alps of his tribe by his father, Süleyman Şah. He also became the Bey of his own Kayı tribe after he migrated to Western Anatolia breaking apart from his elder brothers. Sultan Alaeddin Keykubat also made him the Uç Bey after he defeated Tekfur Vasilius. He was later also made the ruler of Söğüt and its surroundings as an Uç Bey.

Alpbaşıs of the Kayı tribe (in fiction)

Unknown (Note: Either Süleyman Şah, Alptekin Bey or most likely Kurdoğlu Bey.)
Ertuğrul Bey
Tuğtekin Bey (Note: Joint with the Dodurga tribe, whilst Tuğtekin himself is a Dodurga.)
Gündoğdu Bey (Note: Joint with the Dodurga tribe.)
Sungurtekin Bey (Note: Joint with the Dodurga tribe.)
Turgut Alp (Note: Joint with the Çavdar tribe after Kutluca Alp's martyrdom.)	Sungurtekin Bey (Note: Joint with the Dodurga tribe, before the Dodurgas migrate to the western borders of the state.)
Bamsı Beyrek (Note: Joint with the Çavdar tribe before the Kayıs migrate to Söğüt.)	Unknown (Note: Possibly Dündar Bey, İltekin Bey, Süleyman Alp or Sungurtekin's son.)
Abdurrahman Alp
Bamsı Beyrek
Gündüz Bey
Batur Bey
Savcı Bey
Göktuğ Alp
Gündüz Bey

Notes:

Beys of the Kayı tribe (in fiction)

Kaya Alp
Süleyman Şah (Note: Kurdoğlu also briefly became the Bey during Süleyman Şah's rule by force.)
Hayme Hatun
Ertuğrul Bey (Note: Dündar became a substitute Bey for a while when Ertuğrul was captured by Simko along with Artuk Bey who also became the substitute Bey for a while. Later, Sungurtekin Bey became the substitute Bey whilst Ertuğrul was imprisoned by Gıyaseddın.) (Note: Dündar Bey and Gündüz Bey became the substitute Beys while Ertuğrul was in Konya, whilst during Ertuğrul's reign, Samsa Çavuş also ruled a separate part of the tribe but isn't included for it was only shown for a period of time and therefore isn't notable.) (Note: Yavlak Arslan and his Çobanoğlu tribe originated from the Kayı who divided their tribe from Ertuğrul's following Hüsamettin Çoban's desire offscreen, mentioned by Arslan Bey.)	Gündoğdu Bey
Osman Bey	Unknown (Note: Possibly İltekin Bey, Sungurtekin Bey or Sungurtekin's son.)

Notes:

Uç Beys of the Sultanate of Rum (in fiction)

Gümüştekin Bey (Note: Rule over the Mongol borders with the extra territory of Erzurum and the surrounding areas.) (Note: Atabey Ertokuş previously serves as Emir of Erzurum, whilst Emir Sadettin rules over these areas before Gümüştekin is made Uç Bey and after his death.)
Candar Bey (Note: Rule over the Byzantine borders.) (Note: Emir Sadettin rules over these areas before Candar is made Uç Bey and after his death.)
Aliyar Bey (Note: Rule over the Byzantine borders.)
Ertuğrul Bey (Note: Rule over the Byzantine borders with the extra territory of Karacahisar Castle, Söğüt, Domaniç and the surrounding areas.) (Note: Emir Sadettin sometimes deputises as ruler of these areas in Ertuğrul's absence, whilst Günalp Bey briefly becomes Uç Bey whilst Ertuğrul is imprisoned by Sultan Gıyaseddın.)
Günalp Bey (Note: Rule over the Byzantine borders with the extra territory of Karacahisar Castle and the surrounding areas.)
Ertuğrul Bey (Note: Rule over the Byzantine borders with the extra territory of Söğüt, Domaniç and the surrounding areas.)
Beybolat Bey (Note: Rule over the Byzantine borders with the extra territory of Söğüt, Domaniç and the surrounding areas.)
Ertuğrul Bey (Note: Rule over the Byzantine borders with the extra territory of Söğüt, Domaniç and the surrounding areas.) (Note: Alişar Bey is granted rule over these areas as a Sançak Bey by the Mongols, whilst Dündar Bey and Gündüz Bey serve as temporary Uç Beys as substitute Beys in Kuruluş: Osman.)
Yavlak Arslan (Note: Rule over the Byzantine borders with the extra territory of Söğüt, Domaniç, Kastamonu and the surrounding areas.)
Osman Bey (Note: Rule over the Byzantine borders with the extra territory of Söğüt, Domaniç, Bithynia and the surrounding areas.)

== Historical accuracy ==
He was the father of Osman Gazi, founder of [the] Ottoman Empire, which ruled the world for 600 years. And, actually, we do not have too much [sic] sources about that era. Our sources are just about 7 pages... We know that he was a real hero. For him, the limits were not an obstacle.

— Engin Altan Düzyatan, actor

In Diriliş: Ertuğrul, Ertuğrul's character arc is loosely based on the details of his real life, with events such as the Division of the Kayı tribe and Ertuğrul’s conquest of Karacahisar Castle being depicted in the series. Ertuğrul's rule over Söğüt, the first Ottoman capital, as an Uç Bey is also depicted. He is also widely accepted to have been the father of Osman I, as depicted in the series and its sequel.

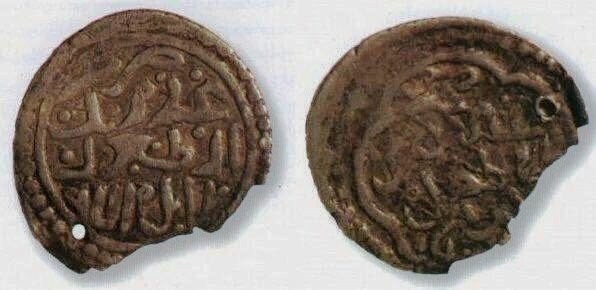
Minted coins by Osman I, indicating the existence of Ertuğrul and that the father of Ertuğrul was Gündüz

However, with the details of much of Ertuğrul's life unclear, much of his character arc in the two series is based on relatively recent Ottoman genealogies, in regards to his family, or merely written by the producers. For instance, Ertuğrul's marriage to Halime Hatun is depicted in the show, although Halime dies giving birth to Osman, contradicting the historical reality where she is believed to outlive Ertuğrul. Meanwhile, Ertuğrul’s marriage to İlbilge Hatun in the series has no historical basis, with İlbilge herself being loosely based on an 8th century Göktürk Turkic khatun, El Bilga.

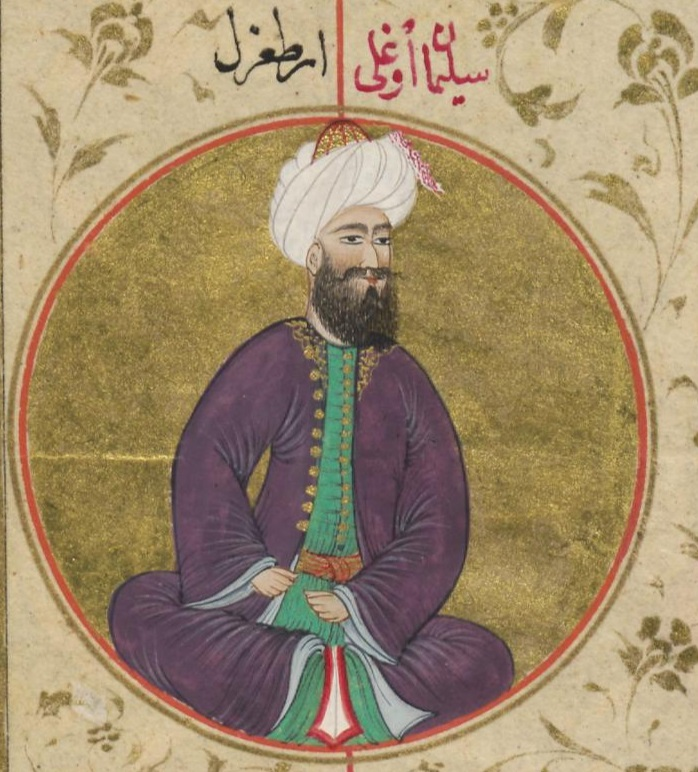
16th century miniature of Ertuğrul

Ertuğrul's connections with other historical characters are another feature of his portrayal in the show that is mostly disputed by historians, given that his connections with the Seljuks were likely to have been at least partially fabricated by Ottoman writers to create a sense of continuity between the two historical Turkic states. He is highly unlikely to have had any interaction with İbn-i-Arabi or Emir El Aziz, and his connections with the fictional Bamsı Beyrek and Doğan Alp were created by the producers, although he was affiliated with the early Ottoman warriors Turgut Alp and Abdurrahman Gazi. The identity of his father is also largely believed to be Gündüz Alp by historians, rather than Süleyman Şah (Suleyman Shah) as portrayed.

== Casting ==
Engin Altan Düzyatan refused an offer to play Ertuğrul twice before Diriliş: Ertuğrul producer and writer Mehmet Bozdağ convinced him. Bozdağ has said there will be a surprise about this character in Kuruluş: Osman while Engin Altan Düzyatan has also said that he may give a surprise in the series but "no clear decision can be made". Ertuğrul was at first thought to appear in season 1, then when he didn't appear, he was still thought to be played by Engin Altan but appear in season 2. Some other rumours indicated that Ediz Hun will play his role. The character's appearance was confirmed at this point. Then when the first trailer was released, it was confirmed that Tamer Yiğit would be playing the role of Ertuğrul.

== Reception ==
In 2020, Engin Altan Düzyatan went on a short visit to Pakistan, where the series is extremely popular, accepting the invitation of a private business company. Pakistan's Make-A-Wish Foundation arranged a meeting between Düzyatan and three young terminally ill fans; when there, Engin said, "Thank you very much, I can see I inspired you and I am very happy for this love." After signing an agreement with the Lahore-based Chaudhary Group of Companies, of which he was a brand ambassador, he visited Lahore and became one of the top discussions on social media and one of his pictures with a lion went viral. He was treated with "a flood of love" while the Pakistani army had to protect him to avoid a stampede of people coming up to him. Engin Altan returned to Turkey when TikTok star, Kashif Zameer struck a deal of a million dollars but only paid 5 thousand back. Despite this fraud, it is rumoured that he will return to Pakistan soon, this was surprisingly said by Mian Kashif Zameer himself, after a clip went viral of his "pleasant memories". Düzyatan also wishes to appear in a Pakistani drama series one day, "if it has a good story." 2 statues of Ertuğrul on horseback inspired by Diriliş: Ertuğrul were placed by a private cooperative housing society in Lahore, Pakistan in 2020. A bust of Ertuğrul was erected in Ordu, Turkey in 2020. It was removed by local authorities after it was pointed out that it resembled Düzyatan.

Mustafa Hanif, a Pakistani Youtuber, was noted for being an "Ertugrul look-alike".

Engin Altan Düzyatan has also been featured in 2020 in 'The Muslim 500' as one of the most influential Muslims because of the series and parents have even began to name their children Ertuğrul.

=== Accolades ===
In 2016, Engin Altan Düzyatan won the Magazinci Awards in the category Male TV Series Actor of the Year. Engin Altan Düzyatan received a total of 4 nominations for the Turkey Youth Awards, all in the same category of Best TV Series Actor, one in 2016, another in 2017. For the Golden Butterfly Awards, he got 2 nominations for The Best Actor and Best Performance by an Actor in 2016. Düzyatan also won an award in the categories Supporting TV Series Actor of the Year and Male TV Series Actor of the Year, respectively for the Golden Palm Awards. Düzyatan also won the Quality of Magazine Award in the category Actor Award. In 2016, he received two other awards, Makinistanbul Media, Art and Sports Award, in the category Best TV series Actor, and the Mimar Sinan Fine Arts High School Award for being the Most Successful Actor of the Year. In 2019, he also received an international award named the Distinctive International Arab Festival Award (DIAFA) for being the Best International Actor.

== In other media ==
Ertuğrul has been portrayed in the Turkish television series Kuruluş/Osmancık (1988), adapted from a novel by the same name.

== See also ==
- List of Diriliş: Ertuğrul characters
- List of Kuruluş: Osman characters
