= Abdurrahman Alp (character) =

Fictional character

- Diriliş: Ertuğrul character Kuruluş: Osman character
- Celal Al as Abdulrahman in Diriliş: Ertuğrul
- First appearance: "Pilot" (Diriliş: Ertuğrul) (2014)
- Last appearance: "Yolun Sonu Zafer" (Kuruluş: Osman) (2021)
- Based on: Abdurrahman Gazi
- Adapted by: Mehmet Bozdağ
- Portrayed by: Celal Al

In-universe information
- Alias: Abdurrahman Gazi (in Kuruluş: Osman)
- Nickname: Abdulrahman
- Position: Alpbaşı (transl. Chief Alp) (formerly)
- Affiliation: Kayı tribe
- Weapon: Sword
- Religion: Islam
- Nationality: Oğuz Turkish

Abdurrahman Alp, sometimes referred to as simply "Rahman", is a character in the Turkish television series Diriliş: Ertuğrul, portrayed by Celal Al. He later appears as a character in its sequel, Kuruluş: Osman, where he is played by the same actor and is referred to as Abdurrahman Gazi. The character is based on Abdurrahman Gazi, a companion of Ertuğrul, Osman I and Orhan.

== Storyline ==
=== In Diriliş: Ertuğrul ===
He is first shown in the first season as the bodyguard of Kayı Bey Süleyman Şah and his wife Hayme Hatun. He is extremely loyal to them and only follows their orders, always protecting them. In the second season, after Süleyman Şah dies, he stays as Hayme Hatun's bodyguard and is again extremely loyal. When Gündoğdu, Süleyman Şah's son, and Hayme's nephew Tuğtekin blame him and Hamza Alp for treachery, Abdurrahman is shown to be patient and continuously loyal to his tribe, unlike Hamza who allies with the Mongols. Ertuğrul, Gündoğdu's half-brother, sends him to spy in Baycu Noyan's camp and see what Hamza Alp is doing. After it is clear who the enemy is, Abdurrahman also prevents the devious Aytolun Hatun from killing Halime Hatun. The season ends with a portion of the Kayı, led by Ertuğrul, splitting from Gündoğdu, and migrating to the Western borders. The third season begins and Abdurrahman is shown to be loyal to Ertuğrul, just as he was loyal to Süleyman Şah and takes part in various battles with him till the end of season 4 where the Kayı move to Söğüt. Abdurrahman continues with what he does in the fifth season. He also becomes the Alpbaşı of the Kayı, replacing Bamsı Beyrek for a while.

=== In Kuruluş: Osman ===
Abdurrahman makes an appearance as an old man in the sequel Kuruluş: Osman. In the first season, he arrives with the news that Ertuğrul, who is in Konya, is extremely unwell. Abdurrahman takes part in many battles alongside Ertuğrul's son Osman and is later forced to live with one arm when his right arm is wounded by Komutan Balgay whilst rescuing Princess Sofia, and is thus amputated. The next season begins after Osman kills Sofia in the first season. Here, Abdurrahman is shown to be very concerned for Ertuğrul when he returns from Konya as Ertuğrul is on his death bed. He prays all day for him and informs him about what is going on in the tribe and is devastated upon his death. He later supports Osman in becoming the Bey and serves him. He is later martyred in an ambush by Kara Şaman Togay, devastating his companion Bamsı.

== Positions ==
Rahman briefly became the Alpbaşı (transl. Chief Alp) in season 5, replacing Bamsı.

Alpbaşıs of the Kayı tribe (in fiction)

Unknown (Note: Either Süleyman Şah, Alptekin Bey or most likely Kurdoğlu Bey.)
Ertuğrul Bey
Tuğtekin Bey (Note: Joint with the Dodurga tribe, whilst Tuğtekin himself is a Dodurga.)
Gündoğdu Bey (Note: Joint with the Dodurga tribe.)
Sungurtekin Bey (Note: Joint with the Dodurga tribe.)
Turgut Alp (Note: Joint with the Çavdar tribe after Kutluca Alp's martyrdom.)	Sungurtekin Bey (Note: Joint with the Dodurga tribe, before the Dodurgas migrate to the western borders of the state.)
Bamsı Beyrek (Note: Joint with the Çavdar tribe before the Kayıs migrate to Söğüt.)	Unknown (Note: Possibly Dündar Bey, İltekin Bey, Süleyman Alp or Sungurtekin's son.)
Abdurrahman Alp
Bamsı Beyrek
Gündüz Bey
Batur Bey
Savcı Bey
Göktuğ Alp
Gündüz Bey

== Reception ==
Celal Al, who played the role of this character, became extremely popular due to the series, in 2021, he thanked his fans in various languages, including Roman Urdu and Arabic, for he reached 800,000 followers on Instagram. Diriliş: Ertuğrul has been well received in Pakistan. Celal Al has been in contact with various Pakistani actors including Imran Abbas, whom he met in Pakistan and was noted for chanting Pakistani song Dil Dil Pakistan. The set of Kuruluş Osman was also visited by Imran Abbas in 2021 where he again met Celal Al. Feroze Khan, where he praised him for his new TV series Khuda Aur Mohabbat 3, and he even welcomed four Pakistani actors; Humayun Saeed, Adnan Siddiqui, Reema Khan, and Sadia Khan, on their visit to Turkey. A video of him chanting in favour of the Pakistani cricket team Karachi Kings also went viral on social media and he also praised a group of Pakistani children for recreating a scene from the TV series. Celal Al paid tribute to the founder of Pakistan, Muhammad Ali Jinnah and donated blood to a children's hospital in Karachi. Al attended the 22nd annual meeting of the Muslim American Society (MAS), a flagship Muslim organisation, and gave a speech about the series and Turkey, this led to a Mexican couple converting to Islam.

== In other media ==
Abdurrahman has been portrayed in the Turkish television series Kuruluş/Osmancık (1988), adapted from a novel by the same name.

== See also ==
- List of Diriliş: Ertuğrul characters
- List of Kuruluş: Osman characters
