= Hayme Hatun (Diriliş: Ertuğrul) =

Fictional character

- Diriliş: Ertuğrul character
- Hülya Darcan as Hayme Hatun
- First appearance: "Pilot" (2014)
- Last appearance: "Diriliş" (2019)
- Based on: Hayme Hatun
- Adapted by: Mehmet Bozdağ
- Portrayed by: Hülya Darcan

In-universe information
- Alias: Hayme Ana (transl. Mother Hayme)
- Position: Bey; Hanım
- Affiliation: Kayı tribe Dodurga tribe
- Family: Korkut Bey (brother)(unknown father); Unknown elder brothers (Note: Martyred.)
- Spouse: Süleyman Şah
- Children: Sungurtekin Bey (son); Ertuğrul Bey (son); Dündar Bey (son); Gündoğdu Bey (step-son); Selcan Hatun (adoptive daughter/step-daughter-in-law); Gökçe Hatun (adoptive daughter); Turgut Alp (adoptive son); Bamsı Beyrek (adoptive son); Doğan Alp (adoptive son); Two unknown sons/step-sons (Note: martyred by Mongols.)
- Relatives: Halime Hatun (daughter-in-law); Gündüz Alp (grandson); Savcı Bey (grandson); Osman Bey (grandson)
- Religion: Islam
- Nationality: Oğuz Turkish

Hayme Hatun, also known as Hayme Ana (transl. Mother Hayme) due to her loving everyone as her own children, is a character in the Turkish TV series Diriliş: Ertuğrul. Hayme is portrayed by Turkish actress Hülya Darcan and the character is based on the alleged grandmother of Osman I, Hayme Hatun.

== Background ==
Hayme Hatun was born in the Dodurga tribe. Her father was the bey of the tribe, and she had elder brothers, all of whom except Korkut were martyred. After Süleyman Şah's first wife died, he came to ask for Hayme Hatun's hand from her father, the Bey of the Dodurga.

=== Personality ===
Hayme Ana, sometimes spelt as Haymana, has a strong personality, being ready to fight anyone, even the toughest of men. She is not only intelligent but also very loving and kind, earning the name "Hayme Ana", meaning "Mother Hayme" in English. Hayme Hatun cares for everyone as her own.

The TRT 1 website states about her character; "She is a woman who will not hesitate to pick up the sword for the sake of her tribe and the good of her sons. Hayme Ana also has enough political awareness and skills to lead her people in the absence of the men."

== Storyline ==
=== Season 1–2 ===
Hayme Ana has moderate influence on the plot in the first season. Hayme Ana is one of the few people who welcomes Halime Hatun, who marries Ertuğrul later, to her tribe, and is shown to be intelligent as has suspicions on all traitors including her brother-in-law Kurdoğlu Bey and adoptive daughter Selcan, who frequently attempts to instigate her husband Gündoğdu against Hayme. In the second season, Hayme Ana is shown to be the leader of her tribe, following her husband Süleyman Şah's will after his death. After the Kayı are attacked by the Mongols, Hayme Hatun leads them to her brother Korkut's tribe. With the traitors in the Kayı being dead, they now have to face the main traitor in the Dodurga, Korkut's wife Aytolun Hatun. Aytolun seeks to make her brother the Uç Bey of the Turks and does anything to accomplish this. After a series of events, including Ertuğrul's hand being severely wounded by the Mongols who captured him earlier, making Hayme Ana prevent him from becoming the Alpbaşı, Hayme is forced to exile her son due to some circumstances, a decision she later regrets. After the treachery of many people, including Aytolun, is revealed and Gündoğdu becomes the Bey, Ertuğrul, Halime and Hayme split from Gündoğdu, forming a separate tribe in the West of the Selçuk state.

=== Season 3–5 and Kuruluş: Osman ===
Hayme Hatun once again has a moderate influence on the storyline after the second season. She is seen with her 7-year-old grandson Gündüz and is also shown to help Halime be a good Hanım. With regular face-offs with the women of the Çavdar tribe, the season ends with the Kayı forming a close bond with the Çavdar. In the fourth season, she continues to do what she did in the third season. However, in the end, Hayme kills the notorious Alangoya, who attempted to exterminate Ertuğrul and his family. In season 5, after the death of Halime, she is shown to be a strong support for her son. She is extremely happy when Selcan, who repented in the second season, returns with her son, Süleyman Alp. When the devious Sırma of the Umuroğlu instigates Hayme's adoptive daughter-in-law Hafsa against Selcan, Hayme is shown to be there to resolve their issues. Hayme even treated Sırma as her daughter while she was betraying her the whole time, the latter being killed by her sister İlbilge, who later marries Ertuğrul. Hayme is mentioned to have died in the period between Diriliş: Ertuğrul and the sequel Kuruluş: Osman. However, she is mentioned by people such as Gündüz Bey and Ayşe Hatun and also by Ertuğrul, when he remembers his loved ones in his final moments. She is later remembered by her grandsons Gündüz, Savcı and Osman when recalling her love for Dündar after he is revealed as a traitor, with Osman wishing she had never loved Dündar, and with Gündüz regretfully remarking that he used to see Hayme's likeness in Dündar.

== Positions ==
In the first season, as she was the wife of the Bey, she was the Hanım of the Kayı tribe, but after her husband's death, Hayme was shown as the substitute leader of the tribe, meaning she became the Bey.

Beys of the Kayı tribe (in fiction)

Kaya Alp
Süleyman Şah (Note: Kurdoğlu also briefly became the Bey during Süleyman Şah's rule by force.)
Hayme Hatun
Ertuğrul Bey (Note: Dündar became a substitute Bey for a while when Ertuğrul was captured by Simko along with Artuk Bey who also became the substitute Bey for a while. Later, Sungurtekin Bey became the substitute Bey whilst Ertuğrul was imprisoned by Gıyaseddın.) (Note: Dündar Bey and Gündüz Bey became the substitute Beys while Ertuğrul was in Konya, whilst during Ertuğrul's reign, Samsa Çavuş also ruled a separate part of the tribe but isn't included for it was only shown for a period of time and therefore isn't notable.) (Note: Yavlak Arslan and his Çobanoğlu tribe originated from the Kayı who divided their tribe from Ertuğrul's following Hüsamettin Çoban's desire offscreen, mentioned by Arslan Bey.)	Gündoğdu Bey
Osman Bey	Unknown (Note: Possibly İltekin Bey, Sungurtekin Bey or Sungurtekin's son.)

Notes:

Hanıms of the Kayı tribe (in fiction)
}}

Süleyman Şah's mother
Hayme Hatun (Note: She also became the ruling Bey after her husband's death.)
Halime Hatun	Selcan Hatun
Hayme Hatun	Unknown (Note: Presumably Sungurtekin Bey's wife or daughter.)
İlbilge Hatun (Note: It is thought that she died or disappeared between Diriliş: Ertuğrul and Kuruluş: Osman. Therefore, it is likely that Hayme Hatun, who also died in this period, or someone else, became the Hanım for some time before Selcan's arrival.) (Note: Zöhre becomes the substitute Hanım while Ertuğrul is in Konya, along with her husband being the Bey, before Selcan's arrival. During the journey from Kuruluş Osman to Kuruluş Orhan, after Bala Hatun’s death, Malhun Hatun became the hanim of kayi tribe)
Selcan Hatun
Bala Hatun
Malhun Hatun
Nilufer Hatun

== Reception ==
Hayme Hatun's character was much loved by fans due to her strong personality and the way she loved everyone. Her character also touched the heart of Pakistani actress Aisha Uqbah Malik. A member of the season 1 cast, Hande Subaşı, who played the role of Aykız Hatun, also praised her character and said that "Hulya Darcan, or Hayme Ana from Ertugrul, was like a mother to us, just like in the show." Like other members of the cast including Hande Subaşı, Hülya Darcan, who plays the role of this character, had to face people who disliked her real-life pictures. An image of Darcan with Esra Bilgiç, who plays the role of Halime Hatun, went viral on social media. It was rumoured that the character will return in the second season of the sequel series Kuruluş: Osman, although she didn't appear.

== In other media ==
Hayme Hatun has been portrayed in the Turkish television series Kuruluş/Osmancık (1988), adapted from a novel by the same name.

== See also ==
- List of Diriliş: Ertuğrul characters
- List of Kuruluş: Osman characters
