= Süleyman Şah (fictional character) =

Fictional character

- Diriliş: Ertuğrul character Kuruluş: Osman character
- Serdar Gökhan as Süleyman Şah
- First appearance: "Pilot" (Diriliş: Ertuğrul) (2014)
- Last appearance: "Vatan" (Kuruluş: Osman) (2020)
- Based on: Suleyman Shah
- Adapted by: Mehmet Bozdağ
- Portrayed by: Serdar Gökhan

In-universe information
- Full name: Kaya Alp oğlu Süleyman Şah (Note: transl. Süleyman Şah, son of Kaya Alp)
- Position: Bey
- Affiliation: Kayı tribe; Sultanate of Rum; Aksakals (Note: also known as the "White Beards".)
- Family: Kaya Alp (father); Kurdoğlu Bey (adoptive brother); Alptekin Bey (adoptive brother)
- Spouses: Hayme Hatun; Unknown wife (Note: Mother of Gündoğdu)
- Children: Gündoğdu Bey (son); Sungurtekin Bey (son); Ertuğrul Bey (son); Dündar Bey (son); Selcan Hatun (adoptive daughter/daughter-in-law); Gökçe Hatun (adoptive daughter); Turgut Alp (adoptive son); Bamsı Beyrek (adoptive son); Doğan Alp (adoptive son); Two unknown sons (Note: martyred by Mongols.)
- Religion: Islam
- Nationality: Oğuz Turkish

Süleyman Şah, is one of the main characters in the first season of Turkish TV series, Diriliş: Ertuğrul, portrayed by Serdar Gökhan. He later appears as a guest character in later seasons, as well as in its sequel, Kuruluş: Osman, where he is played by the same actor. The character is based on Suleyman Shah, the possible grandfather of Osman I.

== Background ==
Süleyman Şah was raised by his father Kaya Alp, along with his adoptive brothers Kurdoğlu and Alptekin. He inherited the Kayı Beylik upon his father's death, and fought in many wars alongside Kurdoğlu, and became blood brothers with him. He also married and had his first son Gündoğdu, before his first wife and two sons were killed by Mongols. Süleyman Şah eventually fell in love with Hayme Hatun, sister of Korkut Bey, of the Dodurga tribe, and married her. He was also forced to kill his adoptive brother Alptekin, after he started a rebellion and attempted to seize the Kayı Beylik, whilst he adopted Alptekin's daughters Selcan and Gökçe, as well as raising his son Ertuğrul's alps, Turgut, Bamsı and Doğan. His son Sungurtekin was also captured in a Mongol ambush at a relatively young age, and Süleyman did not get a chance to reunite with his son before his death.

== Storyline ==
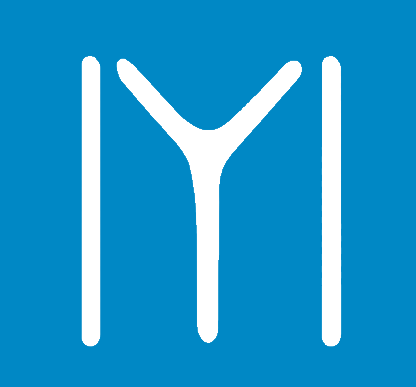
Flag of the Kayı tribe

=== Season 1 ===
In the first season, Süleyman Şah is depicted as the long-serving Bey of the Kayı tribe, struggling to combat the tribe's poverty and dealing with the ambition of his blood brother Kurdoğlu and son Gündoğdu. Due to these issues, he sends his son, Ertuğrul, to ask for land from the Emir of Aleppo. This is made almost impossible when the Kayı are put in a series of problems with the Templars after Ertuğrul saves Şehzade Numan, Halime Sultan, and Şehzade Yiğit, with Süleyman Şah's tribe being persecuted and Ertuğrul being imprisoned by the manipulated Emir, although Ertuğrul later shows him the truth. A problem also arises with Kurdoğlu, after he seeks his blood brother's Beylik with the help of the Templars and Süleyman's daughter-in-law Selcan Hatun, who wants revenge from Süleyman Şah as he killed her treacherous father, Alptekin Bey. Selcan's husband Gündoğdu also becomes jealous of his brother Ertuğrul as he is respected as the tribe hero but gradually calms down, and helps his father Süleyman Şah defeat Kurdoğlu's tricks and secures his father's Beylik. After Kurdoğlu briefly overthrows Süleyman and attempts to murder him, he is captured and beheaded by Ertuğrul, who later successfully defeats the Templars and captures their castle on his father's orders, and Selcan repents. This is followed by Süleyman Şah's death and the tribe's migration to Erzurum as part of Süleyman Şah's will before he died, whilst Süleyman nominates Ertuğrul as the tribe's Alpbaşı (transl. Chief Alp) in his will.

=== Season 2–5 and Kuruluş: Osman ===
Süleyman Şah has a moderate influence on the plot of the second season, despite having died. The nomination of Korkut Bey's son Tuğtekin as Chief Alp overrides his will for Ertuğrul to take that position, angering Ertuğrul. He later appears in Ertuğrul's dreams during his visit to Bithynia, foretelling the greatness of Ertuğrul's future son Osman. He also appears in Ertuğrul's dreams as his first posthumous grandson Gündüz is born, giving him advice on fatherhood, whilst he appears in his widow Hayme's dreams, first assuring her whilst she is wounded, and later telling her to migrate with Ertuğrul to the west. Sungurtekin, having returned to the tribe, also expresses regret over not being able to reunite with his father, whilst Deli Demir and Hayme also express regret over no longer being under his rule. Eventually, Ertuğrul names his sons 'Gündüz', 'Savcı' and 'Osman' as per Süleyman Şah's will, whilst Gündoğdu and Selcan name their son 'Süleyman' in memory of him. In the fifth season, Süleyman Şah appears in his grandson Osman's dreams, giving him advice in Ertuğrul's marquee. In the sequel series Kuruluş: Osman, Süleyman's son Dündar is shown to be residing in his father's marquee, whilst Süleyman Şah again appears in Osman's dreams, telling him to 'wake up' to his surroundings. Eventually, Süleyman's sons Ertuğrul and Dündar inherit the boil disease that he died from, whilst Ertuğrul also dies due to this disease.

== Positions ==
Süleyman Şah served as the long-term Bey of the Kayı tribe after his father Kaya Alp's death.

Beys of the Kayı tribe (in fiction)

Kaya Alp
Süleyman Şah (Note: Kurdoğlu also briefly became the Bey during Süleyman Şah's rule by force.)
Hayme Hatun
Ertuğrul Bey (Note: Dündar became a substitute Bey for a while when Ertuğrul was captured by Simko along with Artuk Bey who also became the substitute Bey for a while. Later, Sungurtekin Bey became the substitute Bey whilst Ertuğrul was imprisoned by Gıyaseddın.) (Note: Dündar Bey and Gündüz Bey became the substitute Beys while Ertuğrul was in Konya, whilst during Ertuğrul's reign, Samsa Çavuş also ruled a separate part of the tribe but isn't included for it was only shown for a period of time and therefore isn't notable.) (Note: Yavlak Arslan and his Çobanoğlu tribe originated from the Kayı who divided their tribe from Ertuğrul's following Hüsamettin Çoban's desire offscreen, mentioned by Arslan Bey.)	Gündoğdu Bey
Osman Bey	Unknown (Note: Possibly İltekin Bey, Sungurtekin Bey or Sungurtekin's son.)

== Reception ==
Diriliş: Ertuğrul was well received in Pakistan. On Twitter, Serdar Gökhan expressed his love and gratitude towards the Pakistani people and his wish to visit Pakistan. After one of his comments on Kuruluş: Osman and the lead actor Burak Özçivit were misunderstood, he had to say in another video about what he really meant.

== See also ==
- List of Diriliş: Ertuğrul characters
- List of Kuruluş: Osman characters
