= Osman Bey (character) =

Main protagonist in a Turkish TV series

- Diriliş: Ertuğrul character Kuruluş: Osman; Kuruluş: Orhan character
- Burak Özçivit as Osman Bey
- First appearance: "Sırlar Yıllardır Burada" (Diriliş: Ertuğrul) (2018) (Note: He makes prior minor appearances as a baby in season 2 and season 4 of Diriliş: Ertuğrul.)
- Based on: Osman I
- Adapted by: Mehmet Bozdağ
- Portrayed by: Cihan Ünal (Kuruluş: Orhan); Burak Özçivit (Kuruluş: Osman Season: 1–6); Emre Üçtepe (Diriliş: Ertuğrul)

In-universe information
- Full name: Ertuğrul Gazi oğlu Osman Bey (Note: transl. Osman Bey, son of Ertuğrul Gazi)
- Nicknames: Kara Osman (transl. "Dark Osman"); Gökbörü (Note: A type of legendary wolf. He is given this name by Kara Şaman Togay after a shamanist interaction with Baycu Noyan.)
- Position: Bey
- Affiliation: Kayı tribe Aksakals (Note: also known as the "White Beards".); Sultanate of Rum; Ahi brotherhood Ottoman Beylik
- Weapon: Sword
- Family: Ertuğrul Gazi (father); Halime Hatun (mother); İlbilge Hatun (stepmother); Gündüz Bey (brother); Savcı Bey (brother)
- Spouses: Bala Hatun; Malhun Hatun
- Children: Orhan; Alaeddin Ali; Fatma Hatun; Halime Hatun
- Relatives: Süleyman Şah (paternal grandfather); Hayme Hatun (paternal grandmother); Şehzade Numan (maternal grandfather); Şeyh Edebali (father-in-law); Ömer/Umur Bey (father-in-law); Selcan Hatun (aunt); Dündar Bey (uncle); Zöhre Hatun (aunt); Hazal Hatun (aunt); Aygül Hatun (cousin); Batur Bey (cousin); Lena Hatun (sister-in-law); Ayşe Hatun (sister-in-law); Aktemur Bey (Nephew); Bayhoca (nephew); Ertuğrul (nephew); Aydoğdu (nephew); Elcim Hatun (daughter-in-law); Gonca Hatun (daughter-in-law); Nilufer Hatun (daughter-in-law)
- Religion: Islam
- Origin: Bithynia
- Ethnicity: Oğuz Turkish

Osman Bey was the main protagonist in the Turkish television series Kuruluş: Osman, portrayed by Turkish actor Burak Özçivit, spanning around six seasons. He is currently being portrayed by veteran actor Cihan Ünal as an older version of him, in the upcoming sequel Kuruluş: Orhan. He had previously appeared as a supporting character in its predecessor, Diriliş: Ertuğrul, where he was played by Emre Üçtepe. The character is based on Osman I, founder of the Ottoman Empire.

== Background ==
Osman was the prophesied third son and youngest child of Ertuğrul Gazi and Halime Sultan. Before his birth, he featured in various prophetic dreams of his father, mother and grandparents, Sûleyman Sah and Hayme Hatun, suggesting he had a great destiny to be the future leader of the Turks and Muslims.

=== Personality ===
Osman was defiant as a child, eager to hold the honour of his tribe and fighting enemies, often going against his father's wishes. He formed a particularly close bond with Ertuğrul's warriors, Bamsı Beyrek and Abdurrahman Gazi, who admired his likeness with Ertuğrul.

== Storyline ==
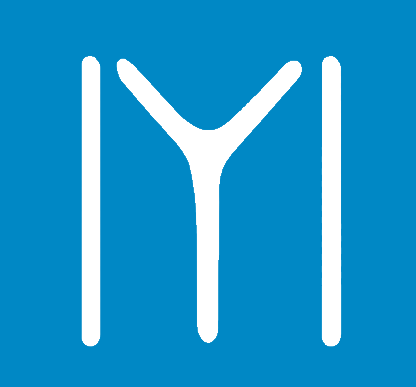
Flag of the Kayı tribe under Ertuğrul's rule

=== In Diriliş: Ertuğrul ===
After much foreshadowing and prophetic dreams, Osman first appears when he is born to Ertuğrul Gazi and Halime Sultan as their third son and youngest child. Unfortunately, Osman's birth was marked by tragedy as it would lead to the death of his mother, who dies giving birth to him. His mother's death would leave the newborn Osman without mother's milk. Eventually, Sügay Hatun became Osman's milk mother. He would become the target of the Mongol, Alangoya - sister of his father's enemy, Baycu Noyan. She would infiltrate the Kayı Tribe. However, he would be saved by his grandmother, Hayme. After the Kayı tribe settled in Söğüt, Osman continued to grow up and became a brave fighter, being the first of Ertuğrul's sons to master the use of weapons, despite his young age.

He then appears as a 10-year-old boy in the fifth season, which starts off with him saving an old man and his daughter from a group of Byzantines. As he is only a child, he is injured, only surviving with the help of İlbilge Hatun, daughter of Umur Bey. As the season passes onto a position where Ertuğrul decides to marry İlbilge, Osman is the only one of his sons who disagrees, showing an attachment to his mother. He again shows this attachment when he is kidnapped by the Mongols, whose shaman realises that he will found the Ottoman Empire, where he remembers his mother, and after Aybars Bey, who was kidnapped by the Byzantines, went to hug his mother after being rescued, being demonstrably upset at his own mother's absence. In the latter case, he is comforted by his paternal aunt, Selcan Hatun, whom he comes to regard as a mother figure. The season ends with Ertuğrul and İlbilge's marriage.

=== Season 1 ===
Osman is shown as a courageous young man when he saves the Tekfur of Kulucahisar when he was about to be killed by the merciless Prensesi Sofia, although she later succeeds in killing the Tekfur. Osman can see through Alişar, the devious Selçuk Sançak Bey, and Sofia's plans, and warns Dündar, his uncle and the substitute Bey of the Kayı during Ertuğrul's absence, about them, despite his refusal to listen. Osman also falls in love with the daughter of Şeyh Edebali, called Bala, although the sheikh tries to teach Osman patience by initially not agreeing to the marriage. As Kulucahisar and Alişar continue to become more aggressive against the Kayı, Geyhatu sends Komutan Balgay to cause more trouble and stop the Kayı, especially Osman, from rebelling against the Mongols. Dündar causes more problems for Osman when Alişar kills Dündar's son and has it blamed on Osman. Soon after, along with the threat from Kulucahisar, Dündar is shown the truth, and Alişar is beheaded by Osman. Osman later marries Bala with Edebali's consent after seeing a symbolic dream, having had to ignore his cousin Aygül's love for him. Following this, after many difficulties, Balgay is presumably killed by Osman during the conquest of Kulucahisar with Sofia's death at the hands of Osman happening in the process.

=== Season 2 ===
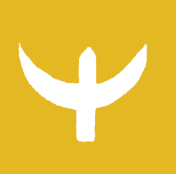
Flag of the Kayı tribe under Osman Bey's rule

Followed by Ertuğrul's return to the tribe, Yavlak Arslan, the new Uç Bey, seeks to create his own state and sees Osman as an obstacle, although they later unite against the new threat created by the Mongol Geyhatu, who allies with the new Tekfur of İnegöl, Aya Nikola, against the Turks of Anatolia. Targun Hatun also arrives in the tribe to kill Osman with the intention of saving her father, captured by Aya Nikola, although she falls in love with him and then tells Osman about her problems. Along with all this, Osman is elected as the new Bey, defeating his relatives Savcı and Dündar, after his father's death, which upsets him greatly, whilst he decides to marry a second wife according to his father's will and changes the Kayı flag. When Targun poisons Bala in order to marry Osman, she is exiled, leading to her wanting revenge from Osman. After Targun's death, Osman meets Malhun Hatun and initiates a major battle with the Byzantines, historically known as the Battle of Mount Armenia, as well as trying to find the traitor in the Kayı, as the jealous Dündar helps the Byzantines stir traps for him. Eventually, Malhun's father Ömer Bey ends his animosity towards Osman and hands over a ring, which Osman deduces to be Dündar's, exposing Dündar as a traitor. He also faces the arrival of Kara Şaman Togay, the son of his father's enemy Baycu Noyan. He is eventually advised by Şeyh Edebali to marry Malhun Hatun to provide an heir to his Beylik, which he reluctantly agrees . Malhun eventually gives birth to a son named Orhan. His joy is doubled when his first wife, Bala Hatun reveals that she is pregnant.

=== Season 3 ===
Osman's principality is rising and he is now after the Catholic world and the Byzantine Emperor himself. Also facing the opposition of not only Aya Nikola, the tekfur of Inegol, but also the tekfur of bileçik, Rogatus, and tekfur of Harmankaya, Mikhael kosses. He captures father Gregor and has a political relationship with Turgut Bey. Osman is shown as a powerful Turk bey. He and his first wife Bala's prayers for a child were heard and soon they had a baby boy, who was named Alaeddin Ali.

Osman is later framed for an assassination attempt on Sultan Mesud's life by the Sultan's traitorous Vizier, Alemshah. Osman is removed as Bey of the Kayi Tribe and replaced with Gunduz who is fooled and influenced by the Vizier. However, Osman eventually proves his innocence and defeats Alemshah - executing him. He then reclaims his leadership over the tribe and forgives Gunduz.

Several years pass and the Kayi tribe continues to flourish and grow stronger under Osman's leadership. They had maintained a truce with the Byzantine Empire and profited from it. However, the truce is broken when Ustad Arius abducts Orhan and Alaeddin Ali and delivers them to the Tekfur of Bilicek and Nikola in an attempt to lure Osman into a trap during the former's wedding with Holofira, the step-daughter of Byzantine Tekfur Basileus and have him killed. However, Osman foils the Byzantine's plans by rescuing his sons, with the help of his wives, and ultimately ends up conquering Bilicek - killing its Tekfur in the process. Unfortunately, when Osman returns to the tribe the following day victorious from his recent conquest, Selcan Hatun, his adoptive mother, breathes her last and dies in Osman's arms - leaving everyone devastated.

The İnegöl Castle was finally conquered and Nikola was executed. But Osman's elder brother Gunduz died of his injuries sustained during the battle, leaving everyone mourning his loss. Çoban Bey's son Ali Bey, who received the news of Osman's successful conquest of İnegöl, is coming to the Kayı Tribe with his son Mustafa and Atabey Ahmet to celebrate Osman's conquest and to lend their support. While awaiting the arrival of Ali Bey and his companions, Osman is overjoyed to receive the news of the impending arrival of another child from his first wife Bala, who is revealed to be pregnant again and later gives birth to a baby girl named Halime Hatun.

== Positions ==
When Ertugrul was on his deathbed, Dundar would instigate Savcı to become the Bey, resulting in him fighting with Osman. All this was stopped when Ertugrul recovered slightly, but shortly died soon after. Osman then became the Bey, whilst Savcı accepted it, although Dündar still seeks the Beylik. He also became the Uç Bey of Söğüt and Bithynia after becoming the Kayı Bey.

Beys of the Kayı tribe (in fiction)

Kaya Alp
Süleyman Şah (Note: Kurdoğlu also briefly became the Bey during Süleyman Şah's rule by force.)
Hayme Hatun
Ertuğrul Bey (Note: Dündar became a substitute Bey for a while when Ertuğrul was captured by Simko along with Artuk Bey who also became the substitute Bey for a while. Later, Sungurtekin Bey became the substitute Bey whilst Ertuğrul was imprisoned by Gıyaseddın.) (Note: Dündar Bey and Gündüz Bey became the substitute Beys while Ertuğrul was in Konya, whilst during Ertuğrul's reign, Samsa Çavuş also ruled a separate part of the tribe but isn't included for it was only shown for a period of time and therefore isn't notable.) (Note: Yavlak Arslan and his Çobanoğlu tribe originated from the Kayı who divided their tribe from Ertuğrul's following Hüsamettin Çoban's desire offscreen, mentioned by Arslan Bey.) | Gündoğdu Bey
Osman Bey | Unknown (Note: Possibly İltekin Bey, Sungurtekin Bey or Sungurtekin's son.)

Notes:

Uç Beys of the Sultanate of Rum (in fiction)

Gümüştekin Bey (Note: Rule over the Mongol borders with the extra territory of Erzurum and the surrounding areas.) (Note: Atabey Ertokuş previously serves as Emir of Erzurum, whilst Emir Sadettin rules over these areas before Gümüştekin is made Uç Bey and after his death.)
Candar Bey (Note: Rule over the Byzantine borders.) (Note: Emir Sadettin rules over these areas before Candar is made Uç Bey and after his death.)
Aliyar Bey (Note: Rule over the Byzantine borders.)
Ertuğrul Bey (Note: Rule over the Byzantine borders with the extra territory of Karacahisar Castle, Söğüt, Domaniç and the surrounding areas.) (Note: Emir Sadettin sometimes deputises as ruler of these areas in Ertuğrul's absence, whilst Günalp Bey briefly becomes Uç Bey whilst Ertuğrul is imprisoned by Sultan Gıyaseddın.)
Günalp Bey (Note: Rule over the Byzantine borders with the extra territory of Karacahisar Castle and the surrounding areas.)
Ertuğrul Bey (Note: Rule over the Byzantine borders with the extra territory of Söğüt, Domaniç and the surrounding areas.)
Beybolat Bey (Note: Rule over the Byzantine borders with the extra territory of Söğüt, Domaniç and the surrounding areas.)
Ertuğrul Bey (Note: Rule over the Byzantine borders with the extra territory of Söğüt, Domaniç and the surrounding areas.) (Note: Alişar Bey is granted rule over these areas as a Sançak Bey by the Mongols, whilst Dündar Bey and Gündüz Bey serve as temporary Uç Beys as substitute Beys in Kuruluş: Osman.)
Yavlak Arslan (Note: Rule over the Byzantine borders with the extra territory of Söğüt, Domaniç, Kastamonu and the surrounding areas.)
Osman Bey (Note: Rule over the Byzantine borders with the extra territory of Söğüt, Domaniç, Bithynia and the surrounding areas.)

== Reception and awards ==
In 2020, Pakistan's Federal Minister for Science and Technology Fawad Chaudhry, met Burak Özçivit when he visited the Kuruluş: Osman set with his family. It is unknown when he met the Turkish actor but it's likely that it was after Osman became the Kayı Bey due to Burak's outfit. Özçivit and some other members of the cast also visited Chechnya with the invitation by the Chechen president Ramzan Kadyrov. In 2020, Burak Özçivit won two awards for his role as Osman Bey, the International Venice TV awards in the category The Best Actor, and the Istanbul University Project Club in the category Best Male Actor of the Year.

== In other media ==
Osman has been portrayed in the Turkish television series Kuruluş/Osmancık (1988), by Cihan Ünal, adapted from a novel by the same name.

Coincidentally, Ünal later accepted the offer to portray the role of Osman Ghazi for a second time, in the historical fiction series Kuruluş: Orhan, thus replacing actor Burak Özçivit, who formerly portrayed the role for a record six seasons. Ünal will go on to portray Osman in his latter years.

== See also ==
- List of Diriliş: Ertuğrul characters
- List of Kuruluş: Osman characters
