= Abdurrahman Gazi =

Ottoman military commander

- Born: Unknown
- Died: 1329
- Burial place: Samandıra, Istanbul, Turkey
- Spouse: Halil İnalcık
- Children: Kara Abdurrahman
- Military career
- Allegiance: Ottoman Empire; Kayı tribe (disputed)
- Rank: Military commander

Abdurrahman Gazi was a warrior of Ertuğrul. He also had a military career with Osman I and with his son Orhan Gazi. He was one of the early commanders of the Ottoman Empire, along with the likes of Turgut Alp and Konur Alp. He was the conqueror of Aydos Castle (located in Sultanbeyli District of Istanbul) which he conquered in 1328. He is famous for this conquest with a story of a Byzantine girl.

== Life ==
Abdurrahman Gazi is believed to have been born near the end of the 12th century, but his place of birth is unknown. He is believed to have been a prominent warrior in the periods of Ertuğrul Gazi, Osman Gazi and Orhan Gazi.

While Akça Koca, Samsa Çavuş and Konur Alp, along with other military figures of the Ottoman beylik, were busy with attacks on Akyazı, İznik and İzmit respectively, Abdurrahman Gazi organized raids to the fortresses on the Istanbul side. Until Bursa was conquered, he served as a fighter in the Ottoman-Byzantine border area.

In 1328, Abdurrahman Gazi was sent by Orhan Gazi to besiege Aydos Castle, a prolonged conquest. The castle was allegedly conquered after the Tekfur's daughter experienced a dream of Abdurrahman saving her, prompting her to help Abdurrahman seize the castle, betraying her father.

After the conquest, Abdurrahman is said by historian Halil İnalcık to have married the Tekfur's daughter on Orhan Bey's request, and to have had a son with her.

== Death and burial ==
Abdurrahman Gazi is believed to have died in 1329 in unknown circumstances. He is buried in Abdurrahmangazi village near Eskişehir, in Samandıra, near Istanbul.

== In popular culture ==
Abudurrahman Gazi has been portrayed in the Turkish television series Kuruluş "Osmancık" (1988), and by the Turkish actor Celal Al in Diriliş: Ertuğrul (2014—2019) and Kuruluş: Osman (2019—present).

== See also ==
- Rise of the Ottoman Empire
- Köse Mihal
- Dündar Bey
