= Celal Al =

Turkish actor

- Born: 13 September 1984 (age 41); Artvin, Turkey
- Occupation: Actor
- Known for: Diriliş: Ertuğrul; Kuruluş: Osman

Celal Al is a Turkish actor, known for portraying Abdurrahman Alp in Diriliş: Ertuğrul (2014–2019) and Kuruluş: Osman (2019–2021).

== Background ==
Celal Al was born on 13 September 1984 in Artvin, Turkey. He is of Turkish Meskhetian origin.

== Activism and public image ==
Celal Al has been in contact with various Pakistani actors including Imran Abbas, who he met in Pakistan and was noted for chanting Pakistani song Dil Dil Pakistan. The set of Kuruluş Osman was also visited by Imran Abbas in 2021 where he again met Celal Al. Feroze Khan, where he praised him for his new TV series Khuda Aur Mohabbat 3, and he even welcomed four Pakistani actors; Humayun Saeed, Adnan Siddiqui, Reema Khan, and Sadia Khan, on their visit to Turkey. A video of him chanting in favour of the Pakistani cricket team Karachi Kings also went viral on social media and he also praised a group of Pakistani children for recreating a scene from the TV series. Celal Al paid tribute to the founder of Pakistan, Muhammad Ali Jinnah and donated blood to a children's hospital in Karachi. Al attended the 22nd annual meeting of the Muslim American Society (MAS), a flagship Muslim organisation, and gave a speech about the series and Turkey.

== Filmography ==
Fetih 1453 — Osmanian warrior

Resurrection Ertuğrul — Abdur-Rahman Alp (based on Abdur-Rahman Gazi)

Establishment Osman — Abdur-Rahman Alp (based on Abdur-Rahman Gazi)

Kudüs Fatihi Selahaddin Eyyubi — Adsiz Bey

Mehmed: Fetihler Sultanı — Şamil Bey
