= Tamer Yiğit =

Turkish actor (born 1942)

- Born: 1 January 1942 (age 84); Balıkesir, Turkey
- Education: İzmir Ticari İlimler Akademisi (Izmir Academy of Commercial Sciences)
- Occupations: Actor, model
- Years active: 1961- present (acting)
- Notable work: Kuruluş: Osman
- Spouse: Rukiye Bayrak (m. 1973)
- Children: 3

Tamer Yiğit (born Tamer Özyiğitoğlu; 1942 in Balıkesir) is a Turkish actor. He starred as Ertuğrul Gazi in the history based and adventure series Kuruluş: Osman (2019). Throughout his acting career Yiğit has been a recipient of numerous accolades.

== Early life ==
Tamer Yiğit studied at the Izmir Academy of Economic and Commercial Sciences. In 1962, he was chosen as the cover star for Ses magazine and began his acting career. He went on to act in over 150 films including Toprak Ana, Maskeli Beşler, Suçlular Aramızda, Çalınan Aşk, Kızgın Toprak and Gönül Dostları.

== Political career ==
Yiğit was one of the founders of the Justice and Development Party (Turkey) in 2001. He is a friend of the Turkish prime minister, Recep Tayyip Erdoğan.

== Personal life ==
In 1973, he married Rukiye Bayrak; they have three children. In 1979, he started a business.

== Filmography ==
- Çukur - 2021
- Kuruluş: Osman - 2020
- Kurtlar Vadisi Pusu - 2007-2008
- Satıcı - 1999
- Nilgün (2) - 1999
- Nilgün - 1999
- Dünya Kadınla Güzel - 1996
- Çiçek Taksi - 1995
- Acı Zafer - 1994
- Mümin ile Kafir - 1992
- Yuva - 1990
- Gönül Dostları - 1987
- Aşkın Kanunu - 1978
- Ölüm Yarışı (film, 1978) - 1978
- Cemal - 1977
- Hedefteki Adam - 1977
- Kaçaklar - 1977
- Yaşamak Güzel Şey - 1977
- Zehirli Çiçek - 1977
- Çifte Nikah - 1977
- Vur Gözünün Üstüne - 1977
- Tilki Payı - 1976
- Gurbetçiler Dönüyor - 1976
- Günahkar - 1976
- Kader Utansın - 1976
- Kanunun Kuvveti - 1976
- Kaybolan Saadet - 1976
- Korkunç Şüphe - 1976
- Tepedeki Ev - 1976
- Atmaca Ali - 1976
- Cezanı Çekeceksin - 1976
- Horoz Gibi Maşallah - 1975
- Anasının Kızı - 1975
- Dur Geliyorum - 1975
- Erkeğim Benim - 1975
- Aklın Durur - 1975
- Fıstıklar - 1975
- Halime'nin Kızları - 1975
- Randevu - 1975
- Sıra Sende Yosma - 1975
- Vur Tatlım - 1975
- Bekaret Kemeri - 1975
- Pusu - 1974
- Kalleş - 1974
- Zindan - 1974
- Palavracılar - 1974
- Şehitler – 1974
- Yılan Yuvası - 1974
- Fedai - 1974
- Gel Gardaş Gel - 1974
- Namus Belası - 1974
- Reşo / Vatan İçin - 1974
- Azap - 1973
- Kızgın Toprak - 1973
- Patron - 1973
- Harman Sonu - 1973
- Irgat - 1973
- Kurt Kapanı - 1973
- Tuzak - 1973
- Yabancı - 1973
- Kara Toprak - 1973
- Toprak Ana - 1973
- Acı Sevda - 1972
- Şehvet - 1972
- Tehlikeli Görev - 1972
- Vahşi Aşk - 1972
- Hacı Murat'ın İntikamı - 1972
- Kalleşler - 1972
- Ya Sev Ya Öldür - 1972
- Aşka Selam Kavgaya Devam - 1972
- Bela Mustafa - 1972
- Fırtına Kemal - 1972
- Vur Gardaş Vur - 1972
- Yıldırım Ajan - 1972
- Merhaba Tatlım - 1972
- Dadaloğlu'nun İntikamı - 1972
- Kin Silah ve Namus - 1971
- Kızgın Yabancı - 1971
- Kazanova Niyazi - 1971
- Batakhaneler Kralı - 1971
- Beş Hergele - 1971
- Bilardo Kazım - 1971
- Çamur Şevket - 1971
- Dadaloğlu - 1971
- Ölümünü Kendin Seç - 1971
- Bir Çuval Para - 1970
- Ecel Teri - 1970
- Acımak - 1970
- İste Kölen Olayım - 1970
- Yazı mı Tura mı - 1970
- Kanun Kaçakları - 1970
- Ölüme Giden Yol - 1969
- Sabırtaşı - 1969
- Ebu Müslim Horasani - 1969
- Günahını Ödeyen Kadın - 1969
- Kaderden Kaçılmaz - 1969
- Kardeş Kanı - 1969
- Ölüm Şart Oldu - 1969
- Ringo Vadiler Kaplanı - 1969
- Sazlı Damın Kahpesi - 1969
- Yaşamak Hakkımdır - 1969
- Zorro'nun İntikamı - 1969
- Sevdalı Gelin - 1969
- Kınalı Keklik - 1969
- Zorro Kamçılı Süvari - 1969
- Menderes Köprüsü - 1968
- Hakanlar Savaşı - 1968
- Gelincik Tarlası - 1968
- Ölümsüz Adam - 1968
- Kara Güneş - 1968
- Belalı Beşler - 1968
- Derebeyi - 1968
- Kara Pençe - 1968
- Kışlalar Doldu Bugün - 1968
- Maskeli Beşlerin Dönüşü - 1968
- Maskeli Beşler - 1968
- Üvey Ana - 1967
- Dördü de Seviyordu - 1967
- Gül Ağacı - 1967
- Akbulut, Malkoçoğlu Ve Karaoğlan'a Karşı - 1967
- Sen Benimsin - 1967
- Erkek Adam Sözünde Durur - 1967
- Zehirli Dudaklar - 1967
- Anjelik Osmanlı Saraylarında - 1967
- Namus Belası - 1967
- Aslan Yürekli Reşat - 1967
- Boğaziçi Şarkısı - 1966
- Biraz Kül Biraz Duman - 1966
- Zehirli Kucak - 1966
- Yosma - 1966
- Aşkın Kanunu 1966
- Yiğitler Ölmezmiş - 1966
- Anadolu Kanunu - 1966
- Fırtına Beşler - 1966
- Milyonerin Kızı / İntikam Hırsı - 1966
- Kalpsiz - 1966
- Garip Bir İzdivaç - 1965
- Aramızdaki Düşman - 1965
- Dağ Çiçeği - 1965
- Fırıldak Naci - 1965
- Korkunç İntikam - 1965
- Sokaklar Yanıyor - 1965
- Seveceksen Yiğit Sev - 1965
- Şekerli misin Vay Vay - 1965
- Melek Yüzlü Caniler - 1965
- Ölüm Çemberi - 1965
- Kalbimdeki Serseri - 1965
- Zennube - 1965
- Kanlı Meydan - 1965
- Babamız Evleniyor - 1965
- Suçlular Aramızda - 1964
- On Korkusuz Adam - 1964
- Bana Derler Külhanlı - 1964
- Hepimiz Kardeşiz - 1964
- Kalbe Vuran Düşman - 1964
- Son Tren - 1964
- Ve Allah Gençleri Yarattı - 1964
- Hayat Kavgası - 1964
- Dağlar Bizimdir - 1964
- Fedakar Öğretmen - 1964
- Günahsız Katiller - 1964
- Satılık Kızlar - 1964
- Meyhaneci / Can Düşmanı - 1964
- Çalınan Aşk - 1963
- Bire On Vardı - 1963
- Çapkın Kız - 1963
- Sayın Bayan - 1963
- Kendini Arayan Adam - 1963
- Aşk Tomurcukları - 1963
- Yakılacak Kitap – 1963
- Daima Kalbimdesin - 1962
- Atlı Yiğit - 1961
