= Banu Chichek =

Legendary heroine

- Book of Dede Korkut character
- First appearance: Legend II
- Last appearance: Legend II
- Created by: Anonymous

In-universe information
- Full name: Banu Chichek Hatun
- Aliases: Bağnu Chichek; Lady Chichek
- Gender: Female
- Position: Oghuz princess
- Family: Bay Bichen Khan (father); Crazy Karchar (brother)
- Spouse: Bamsı Beyrek
- Children: Unknown daughters Unknown sons
- Relatives: Bay Büre Khan (father-in-law)
- Religion: Islam
- Nationality: Oghuz Turkish

Banu Chichek or Bağnu Chichek (Azerbaijani: Banu Çiçək, South Azerbaijani: بانو چیچک, Ottoman Turkish: بانو چیچک, Turkish: Banu Çiçek) is a character in the Book of Dede Korkut and other Turkic mythology.

== In the Book of Dede Korkut ==
=== Etymology and personality ===
The word Banu/Bani, is of Persian origin meaning "lady" and "wife of the king", therefore it can be thought as a title before the name Chichek. The name "Chichek" means "flower, blossom" which came from Proto-Turkic "čeček", it has a deep-rooted history indicating beauty and it is used as a female name until this day.

The character Banu Chichek is depicted as a strong woman. In the story, Bamsi Beyrek's father Bay Pure asks his son, "What girl among the Oghuz do you want to marry?". Beyrek answers "Father, find me a girl who will rise before I get to my feet, who will be on horseback before I mount my well-trained horse, who before I reach my enemy will bring me their heads; that's the sort of girl to find for me, father." Then his father replies "You seem to want a comrade, a fellow warrior." Adrienne Mayor writes, "In other words, "the kind of woman I want" is "not a wife but a companion."" and "That girl would be Banu Chichak, a Kipchak princess renowned as a skilled "rider, hunter, archer and wrestler.""

=== Storyline ===
==== Birth ====
Legend II (Bamsi Beyrek, Son of Bay Büre Bey or Bamsi Beyrek of the Grey Horse according to translator Geoffrey Lewis) is centered around Bamsi Beyrek. In the legend, it says that once the Oghuz princes all gathered up somewhere. The father of Beyrek, Bay Büre, wept when he saw everyone had a son besides him. The princes asked why he was crying, he replied that it was because he doesn't have a son to carry on his family. The princes all started to pray that Bay Büre would get a son. Bay Bichen (Note: Not to be confused with Uruz Koja.) also prayed that he would get a daughter that he would marry to Bay Büre's son. And they sooner or later got the children they wanted.

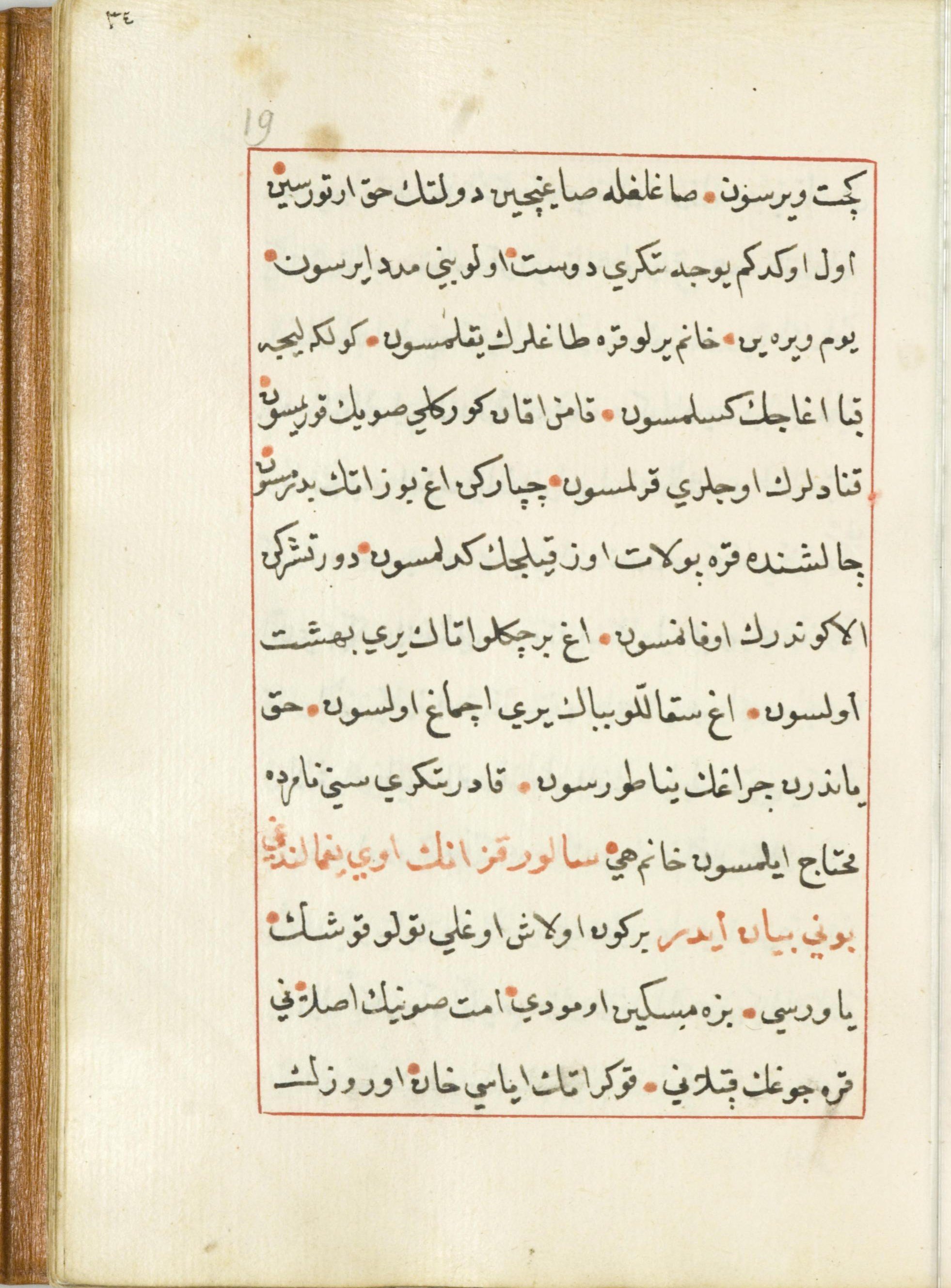
Mention of Beyrek's name in the second legend of the Book of Korkut Ata

==== Bamsi Beyrek meets Banu Chichek ====
Banu Chichek, daughter of Bay Bichen first meets Bamsi Beyrek, her destined husband, when Bamsi went hunting. On the hunt, Beyrek finds a red tent in which Lady Chichek was residing. However, at the time Beyrek doesn't know to whom that tent belongs and a woman, Kisirja Yinge, comes out from the tent and asks him for some of the deer he hunted. Bamsi gives all the deer to her. When maids bring the deer inside, Lady Chichek asks about the young man who hunted the deer and her maids describe him just the way his father described the man she will be destined to marry.

After this, she tells her maids to call Beyrek inside. Banu Chichek hides her true identity and introduces herself as "serving-woman of Lady Chichek.", then she continues "Come, let us ride out together. We shall shoot our bows and race our horses and wrestle. If you beat me in these three you will beat her too." By this, it is implied that only if he can beat her in these three, he would be worthy of Banu Chichek and only then he can marry her. Beyrek's horse passes Banu Chichek's and his arrow splits the girl's arrow but when it comes to wrestling, Beyrek was astonished by her strength, he thinks "If I am beaten by this girl they will pour scorn on my head and shame on my face among the teeming Oghuz." He then "grapples with the girl" and "seizes her breast", when she struggles to free herself in surprise, he had to make a "supreme effort" to "seize her slender waist, held her tight and threw her on her back." After the wrestling, Banu Chichek reveals her name and "Three times he (Beyrek) kisses her and once he bites her." Then, he gives her a ring saying "Let this be the sign of our engagement."

But Lady Chichek has a devious brother called Crazy Karchar, who would kill anyone wishing to marry his sister. With the help of Dede Korkut, Beyrek outwits Karchar and his wedding with Chichek was soon about to happen. However, due to a traitor from the infidels, Beyrek is captured by the ruler of Bayburt Castle.

==== Yaltajuk, the son of Yalanji ====
Sixteen years passed, and Delu Karchar said to the great Bayindir Khan; "Your Majesty — may Allah give you long life —, if Beyrek had been alive all these sixteen years, he would have reappeared by now. If anyone brings me news that he is alive, I shall give that person a bag of gold. If anyone brings me news that he is dead, I shall give him my sister." This leads to the devious Yaltajuk, the son of Yalanji, asking the Khan if he could go and search for him. It happened that Beyrek had once presented this man with a shirt, which he did not wear, but put away and kept. Yaltajuk dipped this shirt in blood and brought it to Bayindir Khan and dropped it on the ground before him claiming he was dead. The shirt was sent to Chichek, who recognised it, and thus everyone believed Yaltajuk and there was great mourning for several days. Bay Bure secretly asked a group of merchants if they knew what had happened to Beyrek. The merchants replied in a song;

- "Dear Bamsi, are you alive and in good health?
- Bamsi, whom we have missed for sixteen years.
- If you want to know about Kazan Bey of the strong Oghuz,
- He is alive and well, oh, Bamsi.
- If you want to know about Delu Tundar, son of Kiyan Seljuk,
- He is alive and well, oh, Bamsi.
- If you want to know about Budak, son of Kara Gone,
- He is alive and well, oh, Bamsi.
- Those princes have taken off their white clothes and put on black for you, oh, Bamsi.
- If you want to know about your white-bearded father and white-haired mother,
- They are alive and well, oh, Bamsi.
- They have taken off their white to wear their black for you, oh, Bamsi.
- I saw your seven sisters crying at the junction of the seven roads, oh, Bamsi.
- I saw them weeping for their brother, who had gone and not returned.
- I saw them tearing their red cheeks, like apples of autumn, oh, Bamsi.
- Banu Chichek, whom you saw at the opening of your eyes, and loved with all your heart,
- Has become engaged and has fixed the date of her nuptials.
- She is to marry Yaltajuk, son of Yalanji, Khan Beyrek.
- Fly from the Bayburt Castle of Parasar!
- Come back and see your gorgeous nuptial tent.
- If you do not, then know this truth:
- You cannot have your Banu Chichek, daughter of Bay Bichen."

Meanwhile, Beyrek met the daughter of the prince of the infidels, who loved him. She became the reason for him escaping. When Beyrek saw that people were getting ready for a wedding, he asked a shepherd about what was going on. The shepherd, who didn't know he was the son of Bay Bure, said that Banu Chichek was about to marry Yaltajuk because Bay Bure's son Bamsi had died. Bamsi then attacked Yaltajuk at the wedding. Yaltajuk didn't know that it was Bamsi and he attempted to kill him. But it was too late and after some events, Yaltajuk's treachery was revealed. In the end, Yaltajuk begs for forgiveness and Chichek marries Bamsi.

== See also ==
- Bamsi Beyrek
- Princess Saljan
