= Uch bey =

Title given to medieval Turkish feudal lords

An uç bey or uch bey (Ottoman Turkish: اوج بگ, romanized: uc beğ, lit. 'marcher lord') was the title given to semi-autonomous warrior chieftains during the Sultanate of Rum and the Rise of the Ottoman Empire. As leaders of akinji warrior bands, they played a leading role during the conquests of the Byzantine Empire and the other Christian states of the Balkans.

The term is analogous to Persian marzban or Western European margrave. Uch beys were proclaimed ghazis and as a rule were dervishes. After Michael VIII Palaiologos removed the akritai and the land grants through which they survived, many Byzantine renegades went over to Ottoman service

Rumelia's first uch bey was Lala Şahin Pasha, who conquered Edirne, Boruj, Plovdiv, and was later the beylerbey of the Rumelia Eyalet. Pasha Yiğit Bey was an uch bey from Skopje to the Serbian and Greek lands, advancing to Bosnia and the Morea. Ertuğrul, father of the first Ottoman Sultan Osman I, was uch bey of Söğüt.

== See also ==
- Osman's Dream
- Ghaza thesis
