= Dodurga (tribe) =

Oghuz tribe

- Tamgha of the Dodurga tribe

Regions with significant populations
- Turkey, Turkmenistan

Languages
- Oghuz Turkic

Religion
- Islam

Related ethnic groups
- Oghuz Turks

Dodurga, Dudurga, Dogar or Tutırka (Turkish: Dodurga boyu, Turkmen: Dodurga taýpasy) was one of the 24 Oghuz tribes from the Bozok wing, the tribe of Ay Khan.

== History ==
In the Middle Ages, Dodurga (do:durga, first syllable is pronounced longer), was one of the 24 Oghuz tribes. They appear as Tutırka (Tuvtırka) in Mahmud Kashgari's Dīwān Lughāt al-Turk and in all other similar sources. Kashgari ranked the Dodurga 16th out of the 24 tribes, Rashid al-Din Hamadani ranked them 10th, while Abulghazi Bahadur ranked them 7th.

Rashid al-Din held the view that Dodurga derived from Oghuz Khagan's second son, Ay Khan, whereas Abulghazi mentioned them as the son of Yildiz Khan (Oghuz Khagan's third son). They both thought that the meaning of the word Dodurga was "to take possession and make a land" (or "to take the land and keep it"). There is currently no other evidence as to the meaning of the name. Russian historian Karpov noted that most of the Dodurga arrived in Anatolia and the south of Armenia during the Seljuk's conquest of the area in the 11th century AD.

== In Turkey ==
In the 16th century, there were tribes named Dodurga in various parts of Anatolia, specifically in Adana, Tarsus, Kırşehir, Yozgat, Kahramanmaraş, Kocaeli, Bolu, Osmancık (Çorum), and some regions of Ankara. Another crowded Dodurga community lived between Ulu Yörük and in seven winter quarters in the Turhal region. These Dodurga people were also called Turhal Turks. There are also numerous toponyms that carry the name Dodurga in various regions of Turkey.

== In Turkmenistan ==
The Dodurga now constitute one of the two major divisions of the Gokleng tribe of the Turkmens.
