= Princess Saljan =

Legendary heroine

- Book of Dede Korkut character
- First appearance: Legend VI
- Last appearance: Legend VI
- Created by: Anonymous

In-universe information
- Alias: Saljan Khatun
- Nickname: Yellow-toned
- Position: Oghuz princess
- Family: King of Trebizond (father)
- Spouse: Kanturalı
- Relatives: Kanli Koja (father-in-law)
- Religion: Islam
- Nationality: Oghuz

Princess Saljan (Azerbaijani: Şahzadə Selcan, Turkish: Selcan Hatun) is a character in the Book of Dede Korkut and other Turkic mythology.

== In the Book of Dede Korkut ==
"Kan Turali Son of Kanli Koja" is considered the most romantic story in Korkut Ata's book. Kanli Koja eagerly attempts to marry his son off immediately. Still, his son has very high standards for a wife:

Before I rise to my feet she must rise; before I mount my well-trained horse she must be on horseback; before I reach the bloody infidels' land she must already have got there and brought back a few heads.

Kan Turali then finds a girl who he thinks meets his standards, Saljan, although her father was the infidel king of Trebizond. Kan Turali rides off to the Byzantine castle, where he has to face all sorts of challenges including having to kill a lion, a bull, and a savage black camel to win the hand of the king's daughter Princess Saljan. After refusing to enter the bridal's tent before receiving his parents' blessing, Kan Turali heads for the land of the Oghuz with his betrothed. After regretting giving his daughter to Kan Turali, the king of Trebizond sends an army to kill the couple. Caught off guard, Kan Turali is nearly about to die in the fight and Princess Saljan saves him, as while Kan Turali sleeps, Saljan realises that other potential suitors for her may come and kill Kan Turali. Therefore, she takes Turali's horse and dons his armour and spear, and takes a high ground to be on the lookout for enemies. Saljan eventually wakes up Kan Turali after her father's soldiers arrive, saying:

Wake up! Raise your head, O warrior!

The foe has come, the enemy is here! Why do you sleep? Arise, warrior!

My part was to rouse you; yours, to fight and show your skill.

Saljan fights off her father's soldiers and saves Turali's life. This leaves Kan Turali furious as he has been saved by a woman. He threatens to kill her, whereupon she promises not to boast about saving him, but still, he is furious. Annoyed, she asks if they could handle the matter with their bows. She shoots first and fails to kill him because she failed to remove her finger from the arrow that she was holding. The couple embraces and reconciles after they now learn that they truly love each other and neither of them can't kill each other. Returning to the Oghuz lands, away from the infidels, they hold a grand wedding feast where Dede Korkut sings the sixth legend (this story).

== See also ==
- Bamsu Beyrek
- Banu Chichek
