= Kayı (tribe) =

Oghuz Turkic tribe

Kayı
- Tamga of Kayı, which its ongon represents the bow and arrow according to Mahmud al-Kashgari

Regions with significant populations
- Turkey, Turkmenistan

Languages
- Turkish, Turkmen

Religion
- Sunni Islam

Related ethnic groups
- Oghuz Turks

The Kayı (Karakhanid: قَيِغْ, romanized: qayïġ; Turkish: Kayı boyu, Turkmen: Gaýy taýpasy) were an Oghuz Turkic ethnic group and a sub-branch of the Bozok tribal federation. In his Dīwān Lughāt al-Turk, the 11th century Kara-Khanid scholar Mahmud al-Kashgari cited Kayı as of one of 24 Oghuz tribes, saying that Oghuz were also called Turkomans.

The name Kayı means "the one who has might and power by relationship" and a Turkmen proverb says that "the people shall be governed by Kayı and Bayat tribes" (Turkmen: Il başy - gaýy-baýat).

== Origin ==
In his history work Shajara-i Tarākima, the Khan of Khiva and historian, Abu al-Ghazi Bahadur, mentions Kayı among the 24 ancient Turkmen (Oghuz Turkic) tribes, direct descendants of Oghuz Khagan. Oghuz Khagan is a semi-legendary figure thought to be the ancient progenitor of Oghuz Turks. Kayı translates as "strong". In his extensive history work “Jami' al-tawarikh” (Collection of Chronicles), the statesman and historian of the Ilkhanate Rashid-al-Din Hamadani also says that the Kayı tribe comes from the oldest of Oghuz Khan's 24 grandchildren who were the patriarchs of the ancient Oghuz tribes, and the name Kayı means "powerful".

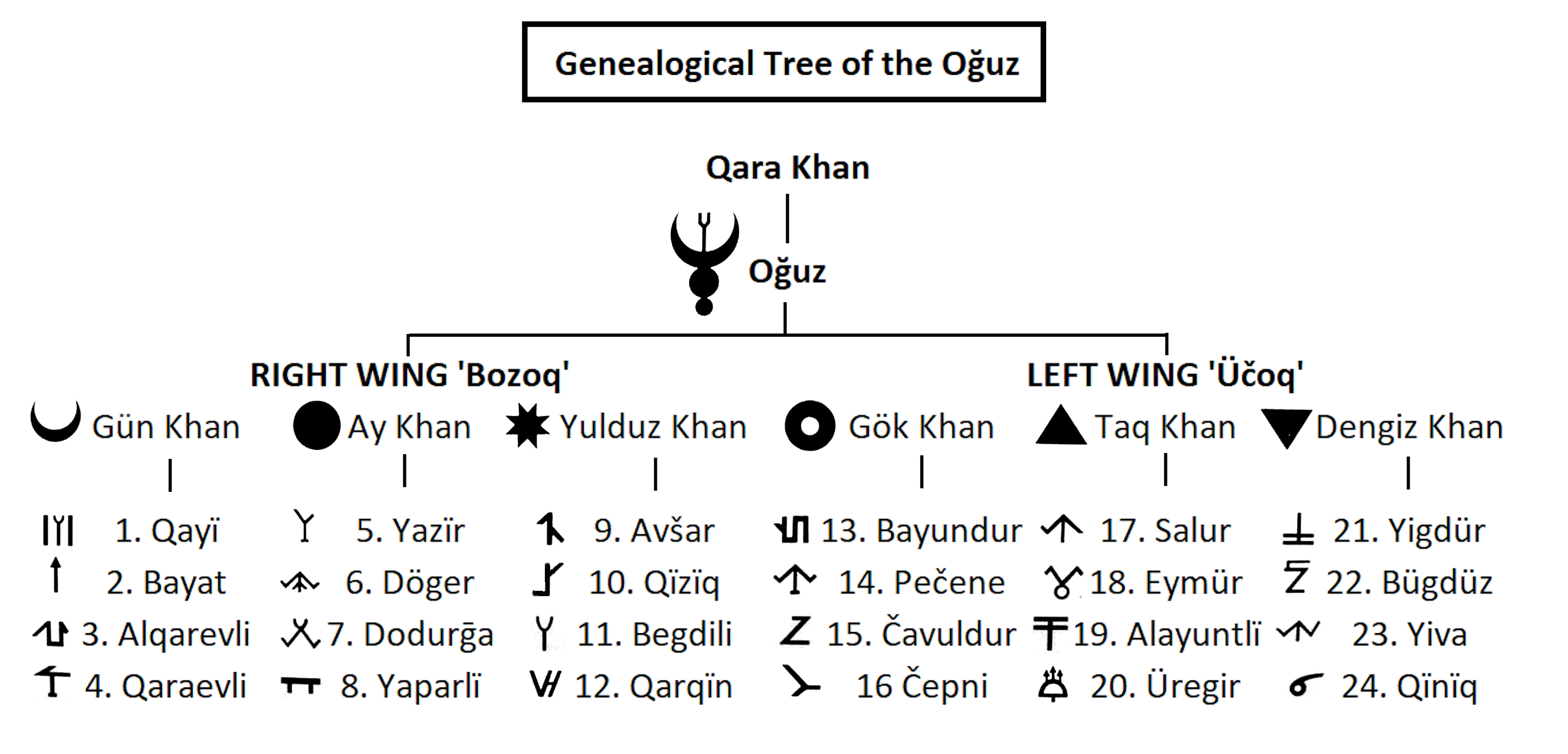
Genealogical tree of Oghuz.

Soviet Sinologist and Turkologist Yury Zuev based on the analysis of tribal names and tamgas from Tang Huiyao, identifies a number of ancient Central Asian Turkic tribes as Oghuz-Turkmen tribes, one of them is the Kay tribe, whom the Chinese knew as Xí 奚 (< MC *γiei). After examining Chinese sources & consulting the works of other scholars (Pelliot, Minorsky), Zuev proposes that the Kay had belonged to the proto-Mongolic Xianbei tribal union Yuwen Xiongnu and that Kay had been ethnic and linguistic relatives of the Mongolic-speaking Khitans, prior to being known as an Oghuz-Turkmen tribe by the 9th century. Likewise, Hungarian scholar Gyula Németh (1969) links Kayı(ğ) to the (para-)Mongolic Qay/Xí, whom Tibetans knew as Dad-pyi and Göktürks knew as Tatabï; however, Németh's thesis is rejected by Mehmet Fuat Köprülü among others. Later on, Németh (1991) proposes that Mg. Qay is derived from Tk. root qað- "snowstorm, blizzard"; nevertheless, Golden points out that Qay has several Mongolic etymologies: ɣai "misfortune", χai "interjection of grief", χai "to seek", χai "to hew".

Even so, Köprülü rejects scholarly attempts to link the formerly Mongolic Qay/Xi to the Oghuz Turkic tribe Qayı(ğ); he points out that Kashgari's Dīwān Lughāt al-Turk distinguished the Qay tribe from the Qayığ branch/sub-tribe of the Oghuz-Turkmen tribe.

== History ==
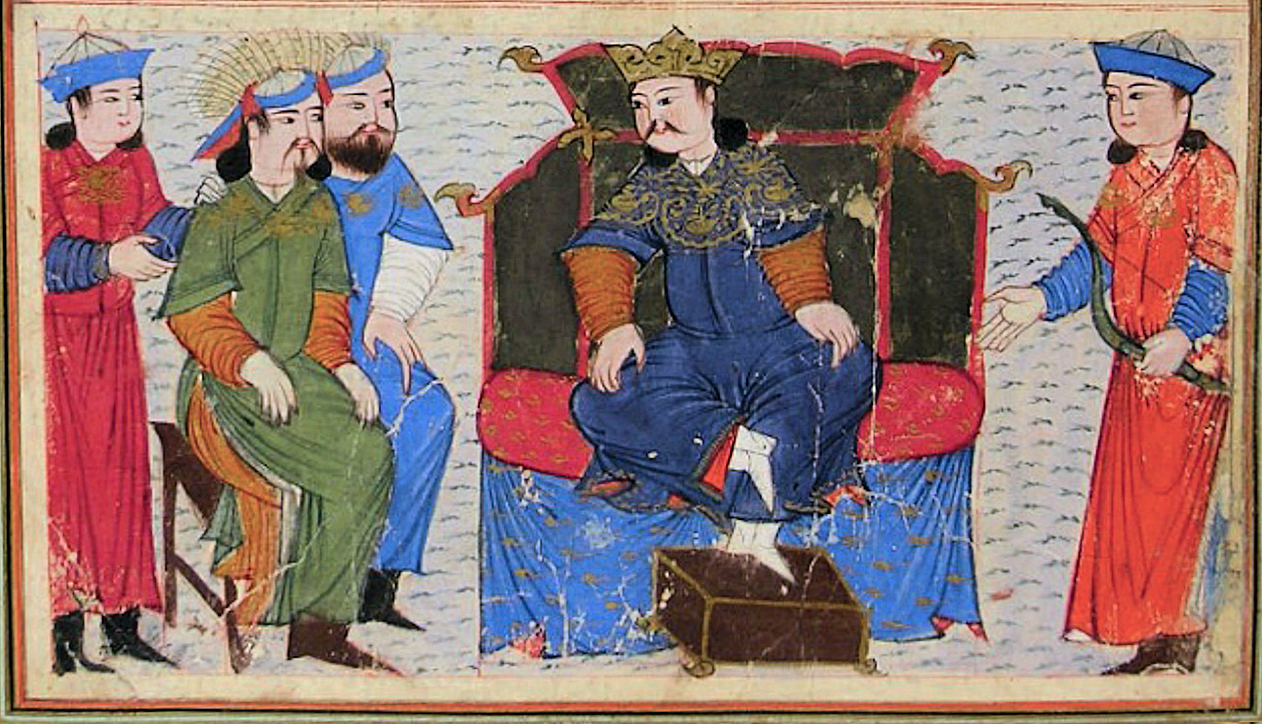
Council of Tuman, Köl Erki, Kayı Yavgu Han and Korkut. Jami al-Tawarikh (1426-30), Herat

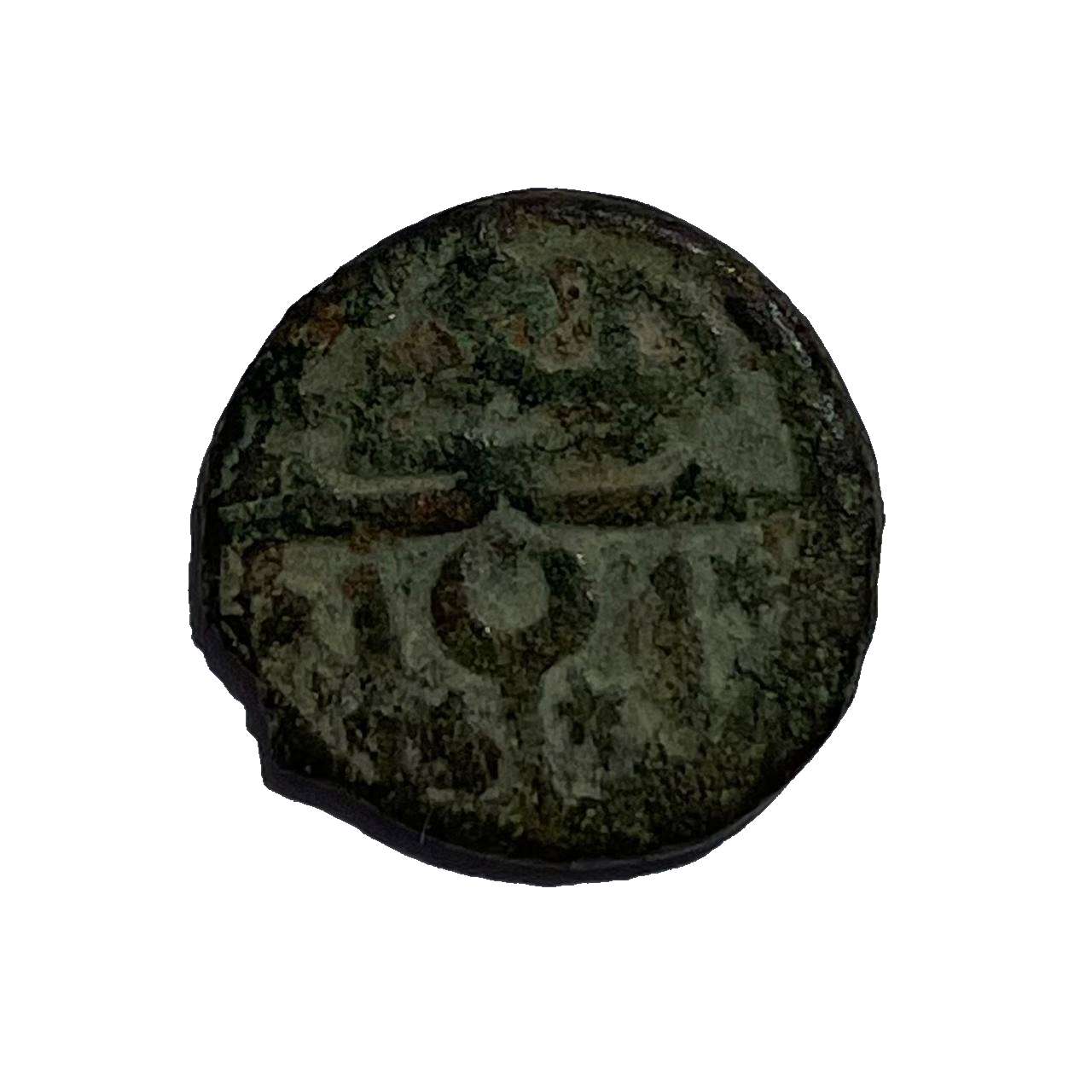
Manghir coin of Murad II with the Kayı tamga

According to Ottoman tradition, Osman I, the founder of the Ottoman Empire, was a descendant of the Kayı. This claim has, however, been called into serious question by many modern historians. The only evidence for the Ottomans' Kayı descent came from genealogies written during the fifteenth century, several centuries after the life of Osman. More significantly, the earliest genealogies written by the Ottomans did not include any reference to Kayı descent, indicating that it may have been fabricated at a later date.

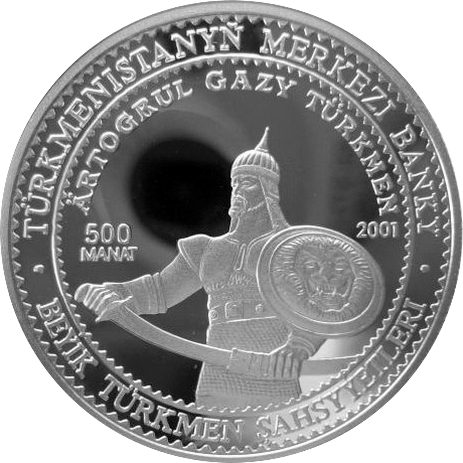
Coin of 500 old manats (2001) depicting monument to Ertuğrul of the Kayı at the Independence Monument in Ashgabat, Turkmenistan

The famous Oghuz folk narrator, soothsayer and bard Dede Korkut was a Kayı. In the 10th century, the Central Asian Oghuz Yabgu State was headed by supreme leaders (or Yabghu) who belonged to the Kayı tribe.

According to Soviet archaeologist and ethnographer Sergey Tolstov, part of the Kayi tribe moved in the Middle Ages from Central Asia to modern day Ukraine, they are known in the Rus' chronicles as kovuy and kaepichi as one of the tribes that formed the Turkic tribal confederation called the Black Klobuks, (Note: It is unclear whether the Chornyi Klobuki are related to the Karakalpaks of today.) who were allies of the Rurikids of the Rus' Khaganate; Golden however considers the Kaepichi to be descendants of the para-Mongolic Qay instead.

== Legacy of the Kayı tribe ==
Soviet and Russian linguist and Turkologist A. V. Superanskaya associates the Kayı tribe with the origin of the name of the city of Kyiv; however, Canadian Ukrainian linguist Jaroslav Rudnyckyj connects the name Kyiv to the Proto-Slavic root *kyjь, which should be interpreted as meaning 'stick, pole' as in its modern Ukrainian equivalent Кий; therefore, the toponym should in that case be interpreted as 'palisaded settlement'.

In Anatolia, twenty seven villages bear the name of Kayı.

In Turkmenistan, the Kayı tribe is one of the main divisions of the Gökleň Turkmens living in the Balkan velayat and consists of the following clans: adnakel, ak kel, alatelpek, bagly, barak, burkaz, ganjyk, gapan, garabalkan, garawul, garagol, garagul, garadaşly, garakel, garga, garyşmaz and others. The Kayı are also a subtribe of the Bayat Turkmens of the Lebap velayat.

== Inspirations ==
The name and logo of the İyi Party (İyi means Good in Turkish) of Meral Akşener is inspired by the seal of the Kayı tribe.

== See also ==
- Ottoman dynasty
- Turkmen tribes
- Oghuz traditional tribal organization
- Ptolemaida, formerly named after the Kayı

== Sources ==
- Kafesoğlu, İbrahim. Türk Milli Kültürü. Türk Kültürünü Araştırma Enstitüsü, 1977. page 134
- Gmyrya, L. 1995. "Hun country at the Caspian Gate: Caspian Dagestan during the epoch of the Great Movement of Peoples". Makhachkala: Dagestan Publishing
- Sümer, Faruk (2002). KAYI - An article published in 25th volume of Turkish Encyclopedia of Islam (in Turkish). Vol. 25. Ankara: TDV İslâm Ansiklopedisi. pp. 77–78. ISBN 978-97-53-89403-6.
