= Bamsi Beyrek =

Legendary hero

- Book of Dede Korkut character
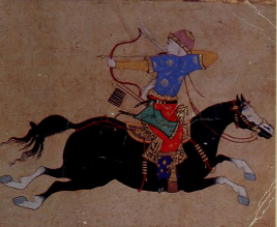
- First appearance: Legend II
- Last appearance: Legend XI
- Created by: Anonymous

In-universe information
- Full name: Bamsi Beyrek Khan/ Bamsi Beyrek Bey
- Aliases: Bey Böyrek; Bey Birye; Beğ Beyreg; Bey Beyrek; Bay Börek; Bağ Böğrek
- Gender: Male
- Position: Oghuz prince / Oghuz Khan
- Family: Bay Büre Khan (father); Unknown mother; Unknown younger sisters
- Spouse: Banu Çiçek
- Children: Aslihan Hatun; Aybars Bey
- Relatives: Uruz Koja Khan (father-in-law); Bay Bichen Khan (father-in-law)
- Religion: Islam
- Nationality: Oghuz Turkish

Bamsi Beyrek (Azerbaijani: Bamsı Beyrək, بامسی بئیرک, Turkish: Bamsı Beyrek, Turkmen: Bamsi Beýrek) is a legendary character in the Book of Dede Korkut and in Turkish, Azeri and some Altai legends. Despite his stories being far-stretched, it is believed that he may have indeed been a real person.

== In the Book of Dede Korkut ==
=== Character and appearance ===
Bamsi Beyrek was the best friend of Salur Kazan, the main character in the stories. He was also one of the four most handsome men of all the Oghuz noblemen but was quite emotional, and he took irrational steps sometimes. His horse's name was Dengiboz or Bengiboz, and it was grey in colour, as “boz” here refers to a grey, ash-grey, or silver-grey coat of a horse.

=== Storyline ===
==== Birth and "how he got his name" ====
Legend II (Bamsi Beyrek, Son of Bay Büre Bey or Bamsi Beyrek of the Grey Horse according to translator Geoffrey Lewis) is centered around Beyrek. In the legend, it says that once the Oghuz princes all gathered somewhere. The father of Beyrek, Bay Büre, wept when he saw everyone had a son besides him. The prince asked why he was crying, he replied that it was because he doesn't have a son to carry on his family. The princes all started to pray that Bay Büre would get a son. Bay Bichen (Note: Not to be confused with Uruz Koja.) also prayed that he would get a daughter that he would marry Bay Büre's son. And they sooner or later got the children they wanted.

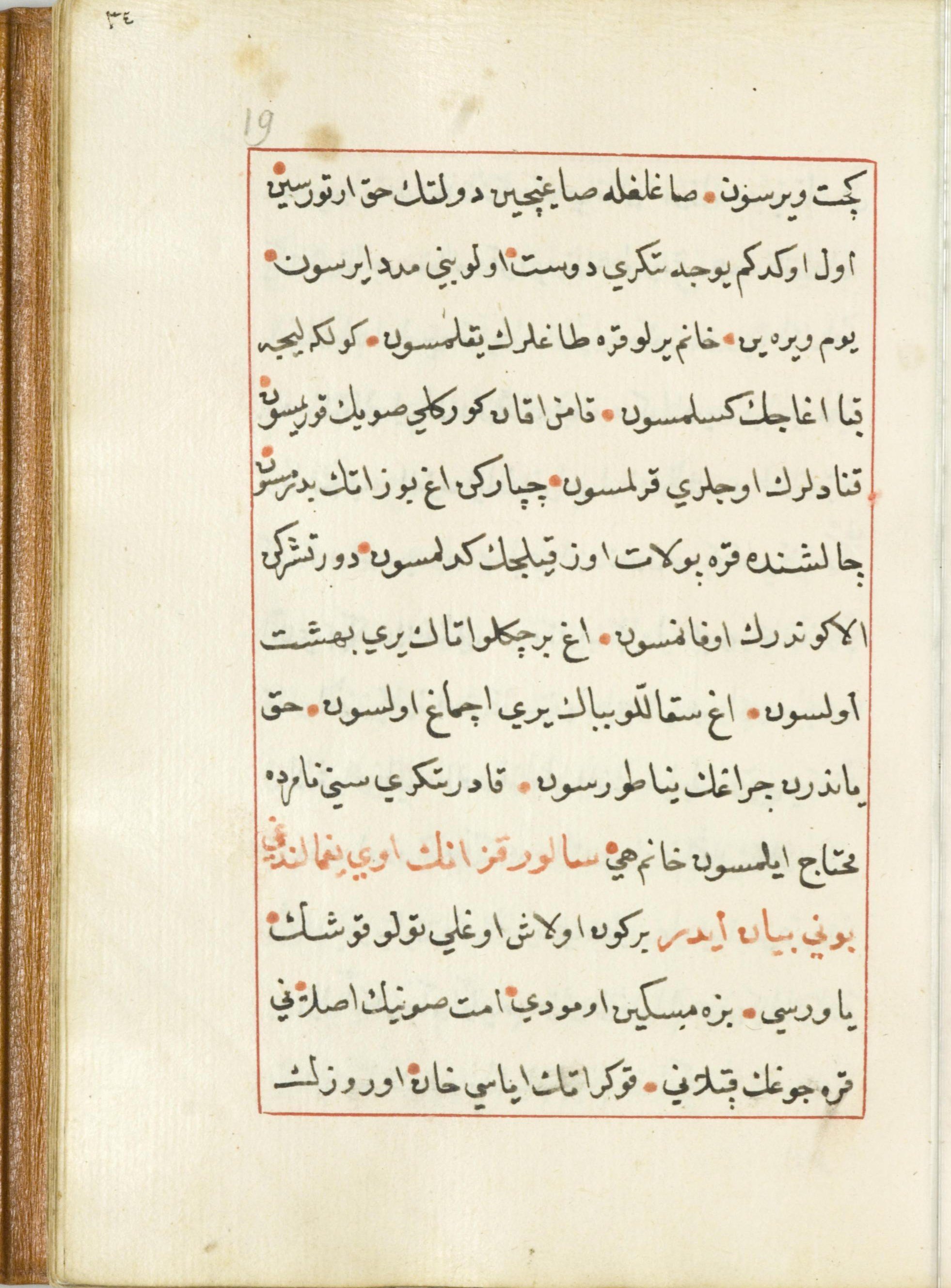
Mention of Beyrek's name in the second legend of the Book of Korkut Ata

Bamsi got his name after Bay Büre sent his merchants to bring some presents. As time went by, the merchants arrived in Constantinople and bought some items, however, on their way back to Bay Büre, they were attacked by some infidels. The son of Bay Büre himself came and helped the merchants by killing all the infidels who attacked them. The son of Bay Büre didn't have any name as an Oghuz Turk was given his name when he beheaded an infidel. So the son of Bay Büre decided to receive these presents from his father instead of introducing himself. When the merchants came back to Bay Büre, they started kissing the young man's hand, the young man had already arrived and didn't tell his father about anything. The merchants then realized that the young man was the son of their great Khan, Bay Büre Khan. They also told Bay Büre about what had happened in the infidels' attack, and the young man's father found out that his son had cut off the heads of his enemies. Then the young man was given the name of Bamsi Beyrek in a gathering of the Oghuz princes.

==== First marriage ====
After he got his name, Bamsi Beyrek met with the daughter of Tekfur Andros, whose name was Hafsa Hatun. He met her at the Karachaisar Castle when they had gone to conquer it. She was initially a Christian with the name Helena. She later converted to Islam to marry Bamsi.

==== Abduction and death ====
He was then later mentioned again in Legend XI, this epic was focused on a civil war that happened between the Outer Oghuz and the Inner Oghuz. Once every three years, Kazan Khan lets both branches of the Oghuz nobles come to his tent and take anything they wish. One year, he lets the Inner Oghuz come to his tent before the Outer Oghuz arrived. The Outer Oghuz nobles were outraged at being slighted, and they swear enmity to Prince Kazan. Beyrek was from the Inner Oghuz and his wife (Note: Not to be confused with Banu Chichek.) was from the Outer Oghuz. Uruz Koja, (Note: Not to be confused with Bay Bichen.) the Bey of the Outer Oghuz, invites Bamsi Beyrek, his son-in-law, to join the rebels to test his loyalty. Beyrek refuses to rebel against Kazan, and Uruz kills him. Kazan and the Inner Oghuz come to the Outer Oghuz to avenge Beyrek's death. In the ensuing fight, Kazan kills Uruz Koja. The Outer Oghuz nobles beg Kazan's forgiveness, which he grants, and Uruz Koja's house and lands are pillaged.

== In films ==
Burak Aksak named one of his films "Bamsı Beyrek" about a love experienced in Oghuz Turks. The film is centered around Legend II of the Book of Dede Korkut, the dastan mainly about Bamsi. In Bamsı Beyrek, he is portrayed by Uraz Kaygılaroğlu.

== Grave ==
A grave marked as 'Bey Böyrek Bamsi Beyrek Turbesi' is in the village of Erenli (Beyrek was also captured by the castle of the same name of the city the village was centered in, Bayburt) in modern Turkey. This grave is thought to be Beyrek's, however, it could be of someone with the same name. Even though Bamsi is traditionally thought to be fictional, it is believed by some people that he was indeed a real person because of this grave. Dede Korkut's grave is said to be in the village of Masat, however, he is also likely to be fictional.
