= List of Diriliş: Ertuğrul characters =

President Recep Tayyip Erdoğan with the season one cast

Turkish TV series Diriliş: Ertuğrul, created by Mehmet Bozdağ, focuses on the life of Ertuğrul, father of Osman I, founder of the Ottoman Empire. In the series, Ertuğrul is portrayed by Engin Altan Düzyatan, and Osman is portrayed by Emre Üçtepe.

Most of the notable characters in Diriliş: Ertuğrul are based on real people related to Osman I and the founding of the Ottoman Empire, including Osman I himself, Halime Hatun, and Ertuğrul, or namesakes of characters from the Book of Dede Korkut, such as Selcan Hatun, Banu Çiçek, and Bamsı Beyrek. Most of the rest of the characters however, were created by the producers of the series, as there were just not that many sources from the era.

Every season has new cast members with starring roles. In the first season, Serdar Deniz [tr], Hakan Vanlı [tr], and Serdar Gökhan were added as members of the main cast. In season 2, Uğur Güneş, Cavit Çetin Güner, and Barış Bağcı were starring. In season 3, Kürşat Alnıaçık [tr], Çağdaş Onur Öztürk [tr], and Cem Uçan were credited as the main cast. In season 4 and 5, Murat Garipağaoğlu [tr], Burak Dakak, Cemal Hünal, Ali Ersan Duru, and İlker Aksum were the main actors.

== Cast ==
This is an overview of the cast in the series. Supporting characters and minor characters (if mentioned) are classed as recurring characters here. Some characters, who made few appearances, as minor or guest characters, are not shown here but are shown in the articles for each season.

Actor	Character	Seasons				
Actor	Character	1	2	3	4	5
Engin Altan Düzyatan	Ertuğrul Bey	Starring	Starring	Starring	Starring	Starring
Serdar Gökhan	Süleyman Şhah	Starring	Guest		Guest	Guest
Hülya Darcan	Hayme Hatun	Starring	Starring	Starring	Starring	Starring
Esra Bilgiç	Halime Hatun	Starring	Starring	Starring	Starring	
Cengiz Coşkun	Turgut Alp	Starring	Starring	Starring	Starring	Starring
Nurettin Sönmez	Bamsı Beyrek	Recurring	Recurring	Starring	Starring	Starring
Cavit Çetin Güner	Doğan Alp	Recurring	Starring	Recurring		
Uğur Güneş	Tuğtekin Bey		Starring			
Serdar Deniz	Titus	Starring				
Barış Bağcı	Baycu Noyan		Starring		Recurring	
Hande Soral	İlbilge Hatun					Starring
Muharrem Özcan	Tangut		Recurring			
Hakan Vanlı	Kurdoğlu Bey	Starring				
Burak Hakkı	Alaeddin Keykubat			Guest	Recurring	
Murat Garipağaoğlu	Emir Sadettin Köpek		Recurring	Recurring	Starring	
Kürşat Alnıaçık	Ural Bey			Starring		
Cem Uçan	Aliyar Bey			Starring		
Çağdaş Onur Öztürk	Vasilius			Starring		
Cemal Hünal	Komutan Ares /Ahmet Alp			Guest	Starring	
İlker Aksum	Dragos					Starring
Ali Ersan Duru	Beybolat Bey					Starring
Didem Balçın	Selcan Hatun	Starring	Starring			Recurring
Kaan Taşaner	Gündoğdu Bey	Starring	Starring			Recurring
Yaman Tümen (Note: in seasons 3—4)	Gündüz Alp			Recurring	Recurring	Recurring
Arif Diren (Note: in season 5)	Gündüz Alp			Recurring	Recurring	Recurring
Kerem Bekişoğlu	Savcı Bey					Recurring
Emre Üçtepe	Osman Bey					Recurring
Ozman Sirgood	İbn-i Arabi	Recurring	Recurring	Recurring	Recurring	Guest − voice only
Arda Anarat (Note: in seasons 1—2)	Dündar Bey	Recurring	Guest	Recurring	Recurring	
Batuhan Karacakaya (Note: in season 3—4)	Dündar Bey	Recurring	Guest	Recurring	Recurring	
Mehmet Çevik	Deli Demir	Recurring	Recurring			
Hande Subaşı	Aykız Hatun	Recurring				
Burcu Kıratlı	Gökçe Hatun	Recurring	Recurring			
Hüseyin Özay	Korkut Bey	Guest	Recurring			
Ayberk Pekcan	Artuk Bey		Recurring	Recurring	Recurring	Recurring
Ezgi Esma Kürklü	Banu Çiçek Hatun		Recurring	Recurring		
Tolga Sala	Hamza Alp	Recurring	Recurring			
Celal Al	Abdurrahman Alp	Recurring	Recurring	Recurring	Recurring	Recurring
Melih Özdoğan	Samsa Alp		Recurring	Recurring	Recurring	
Levent Öktem	Petruccio Manzini	Recurring				
Dilek Serbest	İzadora	Recurring				
Can Kahraman	Kara Toygar	Recurring				
Iskender Altin	Ömer Derviş	Recurring				
Mehmet Emin İnci	Emir El-Aziz	Recurring				
Burak Temiz	Şehzade Yiğit/ Yiğit Alp	Recurring	Guest			
Sedat Savtak	Şehzade Numan	Recurring				
Turgut Tunçalp	Afşin Bey	Recurring				
Gökhan Atalay	Atabey Şahabeddin Tuğrul	Recurring				
Reshad Strik	Claudius/ Ömer Alp	Recurring				
Burak Çimen	Nasir	Recurring				
Sezgin Erdemir	Sungurtekin Bey		Recurring		Recurring	
Melikşah Özen	Melikşah Alp	Recurring	Recurring	Recurring	Recurring	Recurring
Atilla Engin	Kardinal Thomas	Recurring				
Zaynep Aydemir	Eftelya	Recurring				
Sinem Öztürk	Mahperi Hatun				Recurring	
Burak Dakak	Şehzade/Sultan Gıyaseddin				Starring	
Hasan Küçükçetin	Atabey Altun Aba				Recurring	
Erden Alkan	Candar Bey			Recurring		
Gülçin Santırcıoğlu	Çolpan Hatun/ Ekaterina			Recurring		
Gülsim Ali	Aslıhan Hatun			Recurring	Recurring	
Gökhan Bekletenler	Haçaturyan Usta			Recurring		
Burçin Abdullah	Hafsa Hatun /Helena			Recurring	Recurring	Recurring
Renan Karagözoğlu	Acar Bey			Recurring		
Nazlı Yanılmaz	Günyeli Hatun			Recurring		
Evren Erler	Kocabaş Alp		Recurring			
Attila Kiliç	Bogaç Alp		Recurring			
Evrim Solmaz	Aytolun Hatun		Recurring			
Zeynep Kiziltan	Goncagül Hatun		Recurring			
Mehmet Polat	Gümüştekin Bey		Recurring			
Lebip Gökhan	Hancı Simon			Recurring		
Ertuğrul Postoğlu	Bahadır Bey				Recurring	
Engin Öztürk	Günalp Bey				Recurring	
Ogün Kaptanoglu	Titan				Recurring	
Sera Tokdemir	Marya				Recurring	
Ali Buhara Mete	Mergen				Guest	Recurring
Öykü Çelik	Sırma Hatun					Recurring
Ali Savaşçı	Emir Bahattin					Recurring
Halit Özgür Sarı	Süleyman Alp					Recurring
Uğur Karabulut	Uranos					Recurring
Engin Benli	Komutan Alıncak					Recurring
Emre Erçil	Arikbuka					Recurring
Varinder Oberoi -Viren	Shuaib				Guest	Recurring

Notes

This lists all characters' first and last appearances/deaths. Episode numbers are according to Netflix.

Actor	Character	First appearance	Last appearance/Dies			
Engin Altan Düzyatan	Character	First appearance	Last appearance/Dies	Ertuğrul Bey	S01 EP1	S05 EP88
Serdar Gökhan	Süleyman Şah	S01 EP1	S01 EP76			
Hülya Darcan	Hayme Hatun	S01 EP1	S05 EP88			
Esra Bilgiç	Halime Hatun	S01 EP1	S04 EP76			
Cengiz Coşkun	Turgut Alp	S01 EP1	S05 EP88			
Nurettin Sönmez	Bamsı Beyrek	S01 EP1	S05 EP88			
Cavit Çetin Güner	Doğan Alp	S01 EP1	S03 EP67			
Uğur Güneş	Tuğtekin Bey	S02 EP1	S02 EP95			
Serdar Deniz	Titus	S01 EP1	S01 EP75			
Barış Bağcı	Baycu Noyan	S02 EP2	S04 EP90			
Hande Soral	İlbilge Hatun	S05 EP1	S05 EP88			
Muharrem Özcan	Tangut	S02 EP1	S02 EP63			
Hakan Vanlı	Kurdoğlu Bey	S01 EP1	S01 EP65			
Burak Hakkı	Alaeddin Keykubat	S03 EP78	S04 EP50			
Murat Garipağaoğlu	Emir Sadettin Köpek	S02 EP59	S04 EP73			
Kürşat Alnıaçık	Ural Bey	S03 EP1	S03 EP76			
Cem Uçan	Aliyar Asen Bey	S03 EP5	S03 EP81			
Çağdaş Onur Öztürk	Vasilius	S03 EP30	S03 EP86			
Cemal Hünal	Tekfur Ares /Ahmet Alp	S03 EP89	S04 EP78			
İlker Aksum	Dragos	S05 EP1	S05 EP72			
Ali Ersan Duru	Beybolat Bey	S05 EP20	S05 EP80			
Didem Balçın	Selcan Hatun	S01 EP1	S05 EP82			
Kaan Taşaner	Gündoğdu Bey	S01 EP1	S05 EP83			
Yaman Tümen (S03-04) Arif Diren (S05)	Gündüz Alp	S03 EP1	S05 EP88			
Kerem Bekişoğlu	Savcı Bey	S05 EP1	S05 EP88			
Emre Üçtepe	Osman Bey	S05 EP1	S05 EP88			
Ozman Sirgood	İbn-i Arabi	S01 EP3	S04 EP90			

== Main characters ==
=== Ertuğrul Ghazi ===
Ertuğrul Ghazi (Season 1–5), based on the historical Ertuğrul and portrayed by Engin Altan Düzyatan, is the main protagonist of the series. He is the third son of Süleyman Şah and the second biological son of Hayme Hatun. He is the half-brother of Gündoğdu Bey, the brother of Sungurtekin Bey and Dündar Bey, and the adoptive brother of Selcan, Gökçe, Turgut, Bamsı, and Doğan. He is the widower of Halime Hatun, the husband of İlbilge Hatun, and the father of Gündüz Bey, Savcı Bey, and Osman Bey. After the death of his father, he battled the invading Mongols before splitting with his brothers and leading a portion of the tribe to the western borders of the Sultanate of Rum and establishing himself as the Bey of his own Kayı tribe. He later became a senior operative of Sultan Alaeddin Keykubat and Sultan Gıyaseddin. He conquered Hanlı Pazar (public market) and earned the title of Uç Bey (margrave or principality bey) of the westernmost principality of the sultanate. As an Uç Bey, he conquered Karacahisar Castle. As a result, Sultan Alaeddin Keykubat trusts him enough and gives him the lands of Domanic and Sogut. He is one of the only major beys to not be corrupted by the Mongols, which leads to him being a target for Mongols. He returns as an old man in the sequel, Kuruluş: Osman, portrayed by Tamer Yiğit. He dies during a meeting of the Oghuz beys in Season 2 of Kuruluş: Osman.

=== Turgut Alp ===
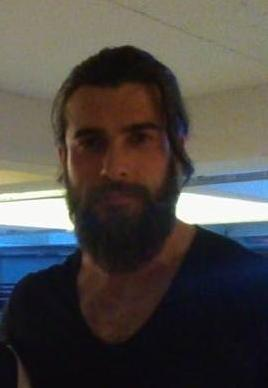
Cengiz Coşkun

Turgut Alp (Season 1–5), portrayed by Cengiz Coşkun, is the son of Konur Alp, adoptive brother of Ertuğrul Bey and the blood brother of Bamsı Beyrek and Doğan Alp. He is one of the three main alps of Ertuğrul, along with his blood brothers. Turgut is Ertuğrul's best friend and the adoptive son of Süleyman Şah and Hayme Hatun. He is also the widower of Aykız Hatun and Aslıhan Hatun. In season 1, Turgut was captured by the Templars and was tortured and brainwashed into becoming a knight named 'Judas'. After Turgut comes back to his senses, he marries Aykız, his childhood sweetheart. At the end of season 2, after losing his wife and father-in-law, he is appointed Alpbaşı (transl. Chief Alp) of the Kayı tribe. He becomes Ertuğrul's spy in Hanlı Pazar before becoming bey of the Chavdar tribe through his marriage to Aslıhan Hatun. In season 5, he works, along with Mergen, for Ertuğrul as a spy, fighting with an axe instead of a traditional sword. Does not appear in the first 5 seasons of Kuruluş Osman. Comes back in Season 6 making Osman shocked for he thought he had died long ago. He describes himself being in the Balkans for a secret mission assigned by Ertuğrul Bey. Eventually becomes a military commander in Osman's Beylik and also a mentor towards Orhan

Aliases:

- Judas (when brainwashed)
- Turgut Bey
- Turgut Alpbaşı (transl. Chief Alp Turgut)
- Turgut Gazi ( Kuruluş Osman )

=== Halime Hatun ===
Halime Hatun (Season 1–4), based on the historical Halime Hatun and portrayed by Esra Bilgiç, is the wife of Ertuğrul and the mother of Gündüz Alp, Savcı Bey, and Osman Bey. Daughter-in-law of Hayme Hatun, whom she treats as her own mother. She is the daughter of Şehzade Numan, the older sister of Yiğit Alp and niece of Sultan Alaeddin Keykubat. She became the Hanım of the Kayı tribe after Ertuğrul became the bey of the Kayı. She fought many enemies by her husband's side and is faithful to her husband and his cause. She was valiant and often fought, along with her family, in order to protect her tribe. In season 1, she was hated by Selcan and Gökçe but later become great friends with them, and they treated each other like sisters. She was being forced to marry Emir El Aziz by her father, despite loving Ertuğrul. In season 3, she has strained relations with Aslıhan, who loved Ertuğrul and wanted to marry him, but later she becomes Aslıhan's good friend. In season 4, She dies after giving birth to Osman. She is frequently mentioned in the sequel, Kuruluş: Osman, by Selçan Hatun in season 1 and by an unwell Ertuğrul in season 2.

Aliases:

- Halime Sultan
- "Ceylan" (transl. Gazelle; nickname given by Ertuğrul)

Hanıms of the Kayı tribe (in fiction)
}}

Süleyman Şah's mother
Hayme Hatun (Note: She also became the ruling Bey after her husband's death.)
Halime Hatun	Selcan Hatun
Hayme Hatun	Unknown (Note: Presumably Sungurtekin Bey's wife or daughter.)
İlbilge Hatun (Note: It is thought that she died or disappeared between Diriliş: Ertuğrul and Kuruluş: Osman. Therefore, it is likely that Hayme Hatun, who also died in this period, or someone else, became the Hanım for some time before Selcan's arrival.) (Note: Zöhre becomes the substitute Hanım while Ertuğrul is in Konya, along with her husband being the Bey, before Selcan's arrival. During the journey from Kuruluş Osman to Kuruluş Orhan, after Bala Hatun’s death, Malhun Hatun became the hanim of kayi tribe)
Selcan Hatun
Bala Hatun
Malhun Hatun
Nilufer Hatun

=== Bamsı Beyrek ===
Bamsı Beyrek (Season 1–2 supporting, Season 3–5 starring)—namesake of Bamsi Beyrek, a character in the Book of Dede Korkut, whose story was referenced by Bamsı in season 3, and portrayed by Nurettin Sönmez—is the son of Altuğ Alp, the adoptive brother of Ertuğrul and blood-brother of Turgut Alp and Doğan Alp. He is one of the three main Alps of Ertuğrul, along with his blood brothers. Bamsı is also the adoptive son of Süleyman Şah and Hayme Hatun, husband of Hafsa Hatun and father of Aslıhan and Aybars. Bamsı is loyal and good-hearted, somewhat slow-thinking, and prone to emotional outbursts. He also fights with two swords, is loyal to Ertuğrul, and enjoys fighting against the enemy. He is a keen story teller, often referencing stories from the Book of Dede Korkut. He became the chief alp of the Kayı tribe after Turgut's marriage to Aslıhan Hatun. He returns in the sequel, Kuruluş: Osman. Martyred by Togay in Season 2 .

Aliases:

- Bamsı Alp
- Bamsı Bey
- Bamsı Alpbaşı (transl. Chief Alp Bamsı)
- "Dağ Ayısı" (transl. "Mountain Bear"; nickname)

=== Hayme Hatun ===
Hayme Hatun (Season 1–5), based on the historical Hayme Hatun and portrayed by Hülya Darcan, is the mother of Ertuğrul, Dündar, and Sungurtekin, and the stepmother of Gündoğdu. She is the widow of Süleyman Şah, adoptive mother of Selcan, Gökçe, Turgut, Doğan, and Bamsı. Younger sister of Korkut Bey. Treated by Halime as a mother, she is mentioned as having had two more sons, or step-sons, killed by Mongols. She is hanım of the Kayı tribe, has a strong personality, and is a constant source of guidance, wisdom, and encouragement for her family. She is mentioned to have died in the period between Diriliş: Ertuğrul and Kuruluş: Osman.

Aliases:

- Hayme Ana (transl. Mother Hayme)

=== Gündoğdu Bey ===
Gündoğdu Bey (Season 1–2 starring, Season 5 supporting), based on the historical Gündoğdu Bey and portrayed by Kaan Taşaner, is the eldest son of Süleyman Şah and step-son of Hayme Hatun. Gündoğdu is also the elder half-brother of Ertuğrul, Dündar, and Sungurtekin, and the elder adoptive brother of Gökçe. He is the father of Süleyman Alp and İltekin, and the husband of Selcan. Gündoğdu is a somewhat cowardly but well-intentioned character who normally does not see through the plans of traitors. He mostly disagrees with Ertuğrul, and he chose to stay on the side that was safer, rather than the side which would fight when the tribe split, only wanting the best for his tribe. He became jealous of Ertuğrul in the first two seasons and even had the idea of marrying Goncagül, the devious daughter of Gümüştekin. He also became the bey of his own Kayı tribe when the tribe split. Later, when he returned in season 5 after Albastı had destroyed their camp, he worked alongside his brother and thought more rationally. He is later mentioned in Kuruluş: Osman, said to be martyred by Mongols.

=== Selcan Hatun ===
Selcan Hatun (Season 1–2 starring, Season 5 supporting)— namesake of Princess Saljan, a character from the Book of Dede Korkut and portrayed by Didem Balçın—is the daughter of Alptekin Bey and the adoptive daughter of Süleyman Şah and Hayme Hatun. She is the wife of Gündoğdu, elder sister of Gökçe, whom she loves dearly, and the mother of Süleyman Alp and İltekin Bey. She is the adoptive sister and sister-in-law of Ertuğrul, Sungurtekin, and Dündar. She was initially evil, supporting anyone against Süleyman Şah, as he had killed her father for treachery, but later repented with the help of İbn-i Arabi. She has a knack for sensing evil intentions, and her character developed even further when she stood up against the evil Aytolun Hatun. Her husband thought she was still evil, but seeing the truth, she found a way to show him the truth too and defeat her husband's devious lover, Goncagül. When she returns in season 5, she is devastated at the martyrdom of her son, Süleyman Alp, and has tense relations with Hafsa Hatun. She returns in the sequel, Kuruluş: Osman, where she becomes a mother figure to Gündüz and Osman.

=== Emir Sadettin Köpek ===
Emir Sadettin Köpek (Season 2–3 supporting, Season 4 starring), based on the historical Sa'd al-Din Köpek and portrayed by Murat Garipağaoğlu, is a traitor who allies with anyone against Ertuğrul and the Selçuk state. Köpek is an important Selçuk court administrator and one of the viziers of Sultan Alaeddin Keykubat. He is the de facto deputy head of the Selçuk state. He was the adoptive father of Günalp Bey, before Ertuğrul convinced Günalp of Köpek's wrongdoings. Consistently an adversary of Ertuğrul, his only motive is to seize complete power and control over the sultanate for himself and to become the Sultan. Köpek even poisons and kills Sultan Alaeddin. He was in love with Aslıhan Hatun and was furious when she married Turgut Bey. On their wedding night, he poisons Turgut and Aslihan but they recover with the cure that Ertuğrul finds eventually. He ends up killing Aslihan but is later beheaded by Ertuğrul, with the help of Emir Hüsamettin Karaca and Togan Serdar.

Aliases:

- Ebu Nakkaş
- Emir Sadettin
- Sultan Sadettin (self-proclaimed)

=== İlbilge Hatun ===
İlbilge Hatun (Season 5)—namesake of the historical El Bilga Khatun and portrayed by Hande Soral—is the daughter of Umur Bey of the Umuroğlu and sister of Beybolat Bey and Sırma Hatun. She is the second wife of Ertuğrul Bey and the stepmother of his children. She is a brave Hatun, skilled in swordsmanship, loyal to her father and the state, and always seeking justice. Her intense emotions have sometimes led her to act irrationally. She is deeply in love with Ertuğrul, but tries to hide her feelings. İlbilge would side with Ertuğrul while her brother and sister would ally with the Mongols. She becomes the Hanım of the Umuroğlu, and later marries Ertuğrul. With İlbilge taking Halime Hatun's role in the series, TRT 1 coordinator Kurtuluş Zaman said Ertuğrul "fall[s] in love with the sister of his worst enemy", adding her love with Ertuğrul was "as if [it was] the first season". She is neither mentioned nor shown in Kuruluş: Osman.

=== Doğan Alp ===
Doğan Alp (Season 1–3), portrayed by Cavit Çetin Güner, is the adoptive brother of Ertuğrul and blood-brother of Turgut Alp and Bamsı Beyrek. He is one of the three main Alps of Ertuğrul along with his blood brothers. Doğan is also the adoptive son of Süleyman Şah and Hayme Hatun, husband of Banu Çiçek Hatun, and posthumous father of Doğan Alp Jr. He is smaller in stature than his counterparts, but has a sharp wit. He plays a major role in the conquest of Karacahisar, even though he was martyred before the conquest. He is later martyred by Ural and Vasilius. He is mentioned again in Kuruluş: Osman by Ertuğrul in season 2.

=== Süleyman Şhah ===
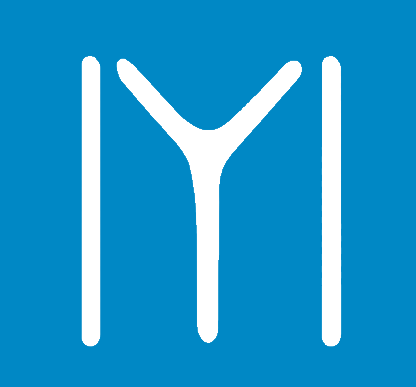
Flag of the Kayı tribe

Süleyman Şhah (Season 1), based on the historical Suleyman Shah and portrayed by Serdar Gökhan, (starring season 1, guest seasons 2, 4 and 5), is the father of Ertuğrul, Gündoğdu, Sungurtekin, and Dündar. He is the adoptive father of Selcan Hatun, Gökçe Hatun, Turgut Bey, Doğan Alp, and Bamsi Beyrek; the husband of Hayme Hatun; and long-serving bey of the Kayı tribe. He is said to have had two other sons, who were killed by Mongols. He only appears in Osman Bey, Hayme Hatun, and Ertuğrul's dreams after Season 1, where he died in the last episode. He also appears in a dream sequence in Kuruluş: Osman, where he is frequently mentioned.

=== Komutan Titus ===
Komutan Titus (Season 1), portrayed by Serdar Deniz, is a commander of the Knights Templar. He seeks vengeance against Ertuğrul for killing his brother, Bisol, when saving Halime and her family. Initially, he is loyal to Petruccio Manzini, but later betrays him in order to become the Üstad-ı Azam of the Templar Castle. He escapes the siege of the castle but is later caught and beheaded by Gündoğdu. He is mentioned in the third season as a motive for Simon's revenge against Ertuğrul.

Aliases:

- Ebu Hişam (Disguised)

=== Kurdoğlu Bey ===
Kurdoğlu Bey (Season 1), portrayed by Hakan Vanlı, is the adoptive brother of Süleyman Şah and leader of many nomad families of the Kayı tribe. He took a dark turn after his wife and children were martyred by Mongols, bearing a deep hatred for his adoptive brother due to the latter's waging wars. He secretly plots with the Templars to make himself the bey of the Kayı tribe. He initially succeeds by force but fails to kill Ertuğrul and Süleyman Şah, and is thus overthrown and beheaded by Ertuğrul.

=== Baycu Noyan ===
Baycu Noyan (Season 2 starring, Season 4 supporting), based on the historical Baiju Noyan and portrayed by Barış Bağcı, is a Mongol noyan appointed by Ögedei Han to expand Mongol power in Anatolia. He is also Alangoya's older brother. He gives the Kayı and Dodurga tribes a tough time in Season 2, killing Tuğtekin and Gökçe, and when defeated by Ertuğrul, he is thought to be dead. However, he returns in season 4, seeking revenge against Ertuğrul, also wanting to make a peace treaty between the Mongols and Selçuks. The peace treaty progresses well but is broken when Ögedei dies the same day Ertuğrul comes to meet him, and thus Noyan, believing Ertuğrul brought a curse, ventures to take his life. In the final season, it is mentioned that he was betrayed by the convert Mergen and killed by Hulagu Han. He is mentioned in Kuruluş: Osman as the father of Kara Şaman Togay.

Aliases:

- Tüccar Abdullah

=== Tuğtekin Bey ===
Tuğtekin Bey (Season 2)—loosely based on the historical Toghtekin, a Turkic commander, and portrayed by Uğur Güneş—is the son of Korkut Bey and Duru Hatun, step-son of Aytolun Hatun, husband of Gökçe Hatun, and maternal cousin of Ertuğrul. He was the chief alp and later, after his father's death, bey of the Dodurga tribe. He is hot tempered and often cannot control his anger. Originally, he was against Ertuğrul, opposing his actions and allying with Gündoğdu, but after Ertuğrul saves him and reveals that Aytolun murdered his parents, he joins him in favour of migration. However, he is martyred by Noyan along with his wife.

Beys of the Dodurga tribe (in fiction)

Hayme Hatun's father (Note: Also Korkut Bey's father.)
Korkut Bey
Tuğtekin Bey
Akça Bey
Unknown (Note: The Dodurga tribe later migrates to the western borders of the Sultanate of Rum under their new Bey.)
İvaz Bey

=== Ural Bey ===
Ural Bey (Season 3), portrayed by Kürşat Alnıaçık, is the devious son of Candar and the eldest brother of Aliyar Bey and Aslıhan Hatun. The husband of Çolpan Hatun, Ural is very ambitious, seeking more and more power, soon finding himself knocking on the doors of Komutan Vasilius. To achieve his goals, he constantly aims to kill Aliyar and Ertuğrul, but is eventually beheaded by Ertuğrul in his attempt to become the Çavdar Bey.

=== Tekfur Vasilius ===
Vasilius (Season 3), portrayed by Çağdaş Onur Öztürk, was originally a Byzantine military commander but was later promoted as Tekfur of Karacahisar Castle. He is obsessed with the idea of driving away all Turks from his lands, and plots ceaselessly against Ertuğrul. He is in love with Helena, and is angered when she discovers he killed her father and leaves to live with the Kayı. He is eventually killed by Ertuğrul when trying to ambush Sultan Alaeddin. He is mentioned again in Kuruluş: Osman.

Aliases:

- Komutan Vasilius (transl. Commander Vasilius, formerly)

Tekfurs of Karacahisar (in fiction)

Ekaterina's father
Tekfur Andros (Note: Helena's father, his name was mentioned at her wedding.)
Tekfur Vasilius (Note: Ekaterina is briefly granted privileges over the castle by the Byzantine Emperor after Vasilius' death.)
Tekfur Ares
Position abolished (Note: The castle is conquered by Ertuğrul, and therefore Artuk Bey is placed in-charge as a representative of Ertuğrul as Uç Bey, followed by Günalp Bey as an Uç Bey.)

=== Aliyar Bey ===
Aliyar Bey (Season 3), portrayed by Cem Uçan, is the second son of Candar Bey, younger brother of Ural Bey, and elder brother of Aslıhan Hatun. Aliyar later became the bey of the Çavdar tribe. He is a pious, scholarly, and level-headed young man, unlike his brother, Ural. He is also a formidable archer, as well as a master detective. He forms a strong, unshakable bond of brotherhood with Ertuğrul. In battles, he wields his trademark two-pointed sword and dagger, which seemingly is inspired by Zulfiqar, the legendary sword of the fourth Rashidun caliph Ali. He is later martyred by Vasilius in an ambush.

Beys of the Çavdar tribe (in fiction)

Yenal Bey (Note: Father of Candar and Bahadır.)
Candar Bey	Bahadır Bey (Note: The tribe eventually merges again with Aslıhan's.)
Aliyar Bey (Note: Ural briefly became the Bey by force during Aliyar's reign.)
Aslıhan Hatun (Note: Bahadır Bey briefly becomes the Bey of both the Çavdar tribes by force during Aslıhan’s reign.)
Turgut Bey
Unknown (Note: The new Çavdar Bey is mentioned to be loyal to the Mongols in Kuruluş: Osman.)

=== Tekfur Ares ===
Ares (Season 3 guest, Season 4 starring), portrayed by Cemal Hünal, is Vasilius's successor as the Tekfur of Karacahisar. He is a skilled Byzantine commander and the best friend of Titan. He was initially an enemy of Ertuğrul, setting various traps for him with the help of Sadettin Köpek and Titan, but he later allied with Ertuğrul after accepting Islam when encountering İbn-i Arabi in a dream. When spying for Ertuğrul in Tekfur Kritos of Bilecik's castle, he is eventually caught as a spy and is eventually martyred by Noyan.

Aliases:

- Ahmet Alp (after converting to Islam)
- Komutan Ares (transl. Commander Ares, formerly)

=== Sultan Gıyaseddın Keyhüsrev ===
Sultan Gıyaseddın Keyhüsrev (Season 4), based on the historical Kaykhusraw II and portrayed by Burak Dakak, is the son of Sultan Alaeddin and Mahperi Hatun, older half-brother of Kiliçarslan, and stepson of Melike Hatun. He is calm and level-headed, and does not get involved in his mother's schemes, although he does override his father's intent in having Kiliçarslan succeed him by becoming Sultan himself. He is devastated when his father dies, but decides not to expose his mother for her involvement. Later, he allies with Ertuğrul against Köpek's attempt to seize the throne. He is likely to have died offscreen after season 4, as Sultan İzzedin Kaykavus then occupied the position of Sultan, as a vassal of the Mongols, in season 5. He is mentioned again in Kuruluş: Osman.

Aliases:

- Şehzade Gıyaseddın (before becoming Sultan)

Sultans of Rum (in fiction)

Alaeddin Keykubat
Gıyaseddin Keyhüsrev (Note: Later as a vassal of the Mongol Empire.)
İzzeddin Keykavus (Note: As a vassal of the İlhanlı.)
Kılıç Arslan (Note: As a vassal of the İlhanlı.)
Mesud Keykavus (Note: As a vassal of the İlhanlı.)

=== Komutan Dragos ===
Dragos (Season 5), portrayed by İlker Aksum, is one of the most respected Byzantine commanders. However, he created his own secret organization, in betraying, and intending to take over Söğüt from, Ertuğrul. He is disguised as the Söğüt church's bell-ringer and gives the task of "being" Dragos to his right-hand man Uranos (Uğur Karabulut), a disgraced Byzantine commander. Uranos is later beheaded by Ertuğrul in Söğüt. Dragos plots many times against Ertuğrul but Ertuğrul foils him. He is caught and finally beheaded by Ertuğrul in Söğüt.

Aliases:

- Söğüt Zangoç (transl. Söğüt bellringer)

=== Beybolat Bey ===
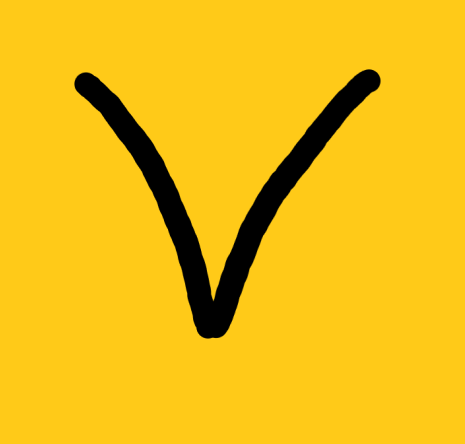
Flag of the Umuroğlu tribe

Beybolat Bey (Season 5), portrayed by Ali Ersan Duru, is the son of Umur Bey and bey of the Umuroğlu after his father's death. He is the elder brother of İlbilge Hatun and Sırma Hatun. Unbeknownst to Ertuğrul, he is a Selçuk assassin who works with the Mongols to wipe out rebelling Oğuz tribes, under a fake name, Albastı. Beybolat vows to kill Ertuğrul and his brothers and wipe out the Kayı tribe in order to become the Uç Bey. He is aggressive, bloodthirsty, and overconfident in his ability to trap Ertuğrul. He has Artuk Bey tortured and kills Suleyman (Ertuğrul nephew) and when he fails, his hidden truth is revealed. Beybolat is brave, as he escapes Ertuğrul's clutches after jumping off a high cliff into a river. When he survives the jump, he teams up with Arikbuka to destroy Ertuğrul and the Kayı once and for all. He is finally killed by Ertuğrul when he had Ertuğrul at his mercy and thus leaves Sırma thirsting for revenge.

Aliases:

- Albastı

Beys of the Umuroğlu tribe (in fiction)

Umur Bey
Beybolat Bey
İlbilge Hatun
Taskun Bey
Bital Bey

== Supporting characters ==
=== Deli Demir ===
Deli Demir (transl. Wild Demir/ "Crazy Iron", portrayed by Mehmet Çevik) is the father of Aykız Hatun and the adoptive father of Turalı Alp. He is treated by Turgut as his own father. The much-loved blacksmith of Kayı tribe, Demir has a strong, fearless personality. A loyal ally of Süleyman Şah and Ertuğrul, he is devastated when Aykız is killed. It is believed that he had two sons, who were also killed by the Mongols. He is martyred by Tangut in season 2. A similar character, Demirci Davud, appears in the sequel, Kuruluş: Osman.

Aliases:

- Demir Üsta

=== Hafsa Hatun ===
Hafsa Hatun (Burçin Abdullah), is the daughter of Tekfur Andros. She marries Bamsı Beyrek, and has a son named Aybars and a daughter named Aslıhan. She is pressured to marry Vasilius when she is in love with Bamsı, before it is proved to her that Vasilius is her father's killer. Raised a Christian (and named "Helena"), she accepts Islam and changes her name to Hafsa. She is great friends with other Hatuns of the Kayı tribe, such as Halime, Aslıhan, Banu Çiçek, and İlbilge. During her pregnancy she becomes very ill and travels to Konya for her treatment and gives birth to her daughter offscreen. She takes on a leadership role among the Kayıs after Halime Sultan's death. In season 5, she has tense relations with Selcan but remains patient. Between Dirilliş: Ertuğrul and Kuruluş: Osman, she and her daughter die in a plague.

=== Aslıhan Hatun ===
Gülsim Ali as Aslıhan Hatun

Aslıhan Hatun (Gülsim Ali) is the daughter of Candar Bey, the youngest sister of Ural and Aliyar, and the second wife of Turgut Bey. She acted as the Hanım of the Çavdar tribe during her father and brother's rule. She is a brave Hatun, who originally had tense relations with Halime, due to her love for Ertuğrul. She was misled by Ural into siding with him, but later supports Aliyar and Ertuğrul after being shown the truth about Ural. After Aliyar's death, she becomes the leader of her tribe, and faces many difficulties, including the arrival of Bahadır. She is later martyred by Sadettin Köpek, who had been in love with her, when she attempts to kill him.

Gülsim Ali, who plays the role of Aslıhan, signed a contract to work with Pakistani actress Ayeza Khan for Pakistani designer Maria B's summer collection following her popularity from Diriliş: Ertuğrul.

=== İbn-i Arabi ===
İbn-i Arabi (Ozman Sirgood) is a famous Arab Andalusian Sufi mystic and scholar based on the historical Ibn Arabi, and is the mentor of Ertuğrul. The spiritual leader of the Muslim world, he provides support to Ertuğrul and his companions, giving Ertuğrul several holy relics and earning the ire of enemies, particularly the Templars and Sadettin Köpek. Arabi does not appear in season 5 due to his offscreen death, although his voice can be heard in the last scene of the series when Ertuğrul and his alps head off to war. He is also mentioned in Kuruluş: Osman.

Aliases:

- Arabi

=== Artuk Bey ===
Artuk Bey (Ayberk Pekcan), a respected bey of the tribe, is an experienced physician who is loosely based on the historical Artuk Bey. He joined Ertuğrul and the Kayı tribe on the journey to the Western borders of the Sultanate of Rum and became Ertuğrul's right-hand man in administering the Hanlı Pazar and Karacahisar Castle. He marries Marya at Ertuğrul's request, before Marya is revealed as a traitor by Artuk Bey himself. Artuk Bey is very loyal to Ertuğrul and his cause, and he teaches his son, Savcı, physics and how to use medicines. He is often regarded as the second-in-command of the tribe, and the closest to him knowing all his secrets. He is permanently blinded by Batur Alp, when Beybolat and Emir Bahattin were searching for the chest, but still knew what was going on around him. When blinded he would receive help from İlçin Hatun. He is mostly described as the 'main supporting character' of the series. He is not mentioned or shown in Kuruluş: Osman, and is therefore assumed to have died offscreen.

=== Dündar Bey ===
Dündar Bey (Arda Anarat, seasons 1–2; Batuhan Karacakaya, seasons 3–4), based on the historical Dündar Bey, is the youngest son of Süleyman Şah and Hayme, the younger half-brother of Gündoğdu, and the younger brother of Ertuğrul and Sungurtekin, as well as Selcan's adoptive brother. He is loving and loyal towards Ertuğrul, and is the only one of his biological brothers to support him when the tribe splits, although he is naive and easily manipulated by others. He indirectly causes Doğan's death by accidentally revealing important information to Ural's allies. He is exiled to Gündoğdu's tribe by Ertuğrul for attempting to sell Hanlı Pazar and leave the Selçuk-Byzantine border. He returns as an older man, portrayed by Ragıp Savaş, in Kuruluş: Osman.

=== Abdurrahman Alp ===
Abdurrahman Alp (Celal Al) is Süleyman Şah and Hayme's bodyguard and later Ertuğrul's loyal Alp. He is falsely accused by the Dodurgas of treachery and is nearly executed, but is saved by Ertuğrul and becomes his spy in Noyan's army under the guise of being a traitor. He later migrates with Ertuğrul to the western borders and becomes one of his senior Alps. He briefly becomes Chief Alp, replacing Bamsı Beyrek, in season 5. He returns in the sequel, Kuruluş: Osman. Based on Abdurrahman Gazi.

Aliases:

- Abdurrahman Alpbaşı (transl. Chief Alp Abdurrahman)
- Rahman

=== Banu Çiçek ===
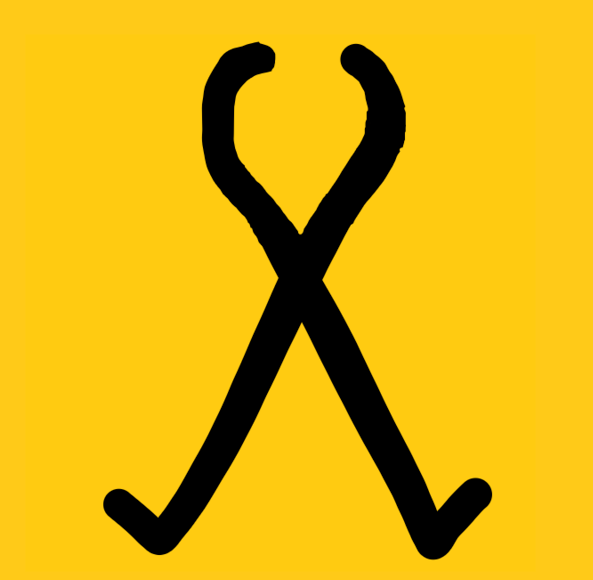
Flag of the Dodurga tribe

Banu Çiçek Hatun (Ezgi Esma Kürklu)—namesake of Banu Chichek, a character in the Book of Dede Korkut, whose story was referenced by Bamsı Beyrek in season 3—is the wife of Doğan Alp, adoptive daughter of Korkut Bey and Duru Hatun, and the adoptive sister of Tuğtekin Bey. She falls in love with Doğan after he rescues her from being imprisoned by Gümüştekin after she is framed for poisoning Korkut Bey. Later, she becomes the personal assistant and bodyguard of Halime Sultan. She is devastated after her husband's martyrdom. She has a son named Doğan; they are not shown or mentioned after season 3.

=== Sungurtekin Bey ===
Sungurtekin Bey, or Sungur Tekin Bey, (Sezgin Erdemir) is the second son of Süleyman Şah and the oldest biological son of Hayme Hatun. He is Gündoğdu's half brother, and the older brother of Ertuğrul and Dündar. He disappeared for years after being captured by Noyan; everyone thought he was dead, but he was actually a spy for the sultan in Ögedei's army. He returns to the tribe after the Mongols find out he was spying on them. Sungurtekin sides with his older brother, Gündoğdu, and does not migrate with Ertuğrul, but later joins him to kill Emir Sadettin Köpek and again with Gündoğdu to escape the Mongols and Albastı. He returns briefly in Kuruluş: Osman. Based on Sungurtekin Bey.

=== Gökçe Hatun ===
Gökçe Hatun (Burcu Kıratlı) is the youngest daughter of Alptekin Bey, the younger sister of Selcan, and the wife of Tuğtekin Bey. She is the adoptive daughter of Süleyman Şah and Hayme Hatun, the adoptive sister of Ertuğrul, Gündoğdu, Sungurtekin, and Dündar. She is Hanım of the Dodurga tribe through her marriage to Tuğtekin. She was in love with Ertuğrul throughout her childhood, thus becoming jealous of Halime upon the latter's arrival and marriage to Ertuğrul. Has tense relations with her sister before making up, and grew to love her husband. She is eventually martyred by Noyan along with Tuğtekin.

=== Others ===
This is a list of characters who were supporting characters in one season only, and may have made minor or guest appearances in other seasons:

Supporting cast

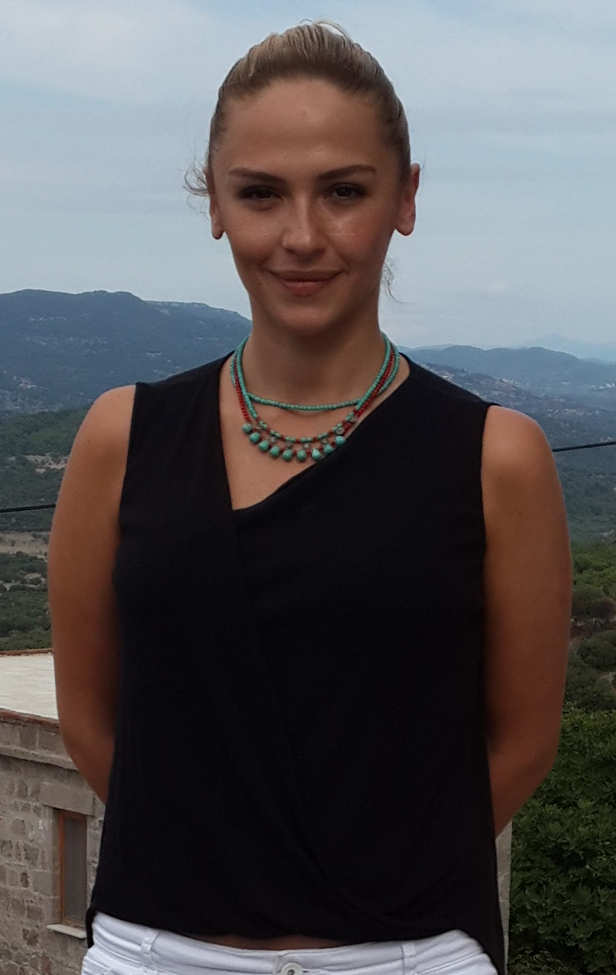
Sinem Öztürk, who plays
Mahperi Hatun

==== Season 1 ====
- Aykız Hatun (portrayed by Hande Subaşı) – The daughter of Deli Demir and the childhood lover and first wife of Turgut Alp. One of the bravest of the Kayı Hatuns, she was the first woman to support Halime Hatun upon her much-contested arrival at the tribe. Took good care of Turgut while he recuperated from his brainwashing. Is skilled with a bow. Is martyred after being fatally burned by Mongols whilst pregnant at the beginning of season 2. In season 3, Turgut still remembers his former lover.
- Petruccio Manzini (Levent Öktem) – The Üstad-ı Azam of Templar Castle, he was sent by the Pope to take over Jerusalem. He minded his own business but got involved with the Kayı after Ertuğrul saved Halime Hatun and her family. Cardinal Thomas worked tirelessly against him without his knowing, and thus he died by a poisonous dagger jabbed into him by his niece, İzadora, and then finally beheaded by Turgut, whom he had mercilessly poisoned when captured.
- Claudius/Ömer Alp (Reshad Strik) – A Templar assassin sent by Kardinal Thomas to kill İbn-i Arabi. However, after confronting Arabi and Ertuğrul, he becomes a Muslim. He is sent as Ertuğrul's spy in the Templars' castle and plays a key role in the Kayıs' conquest of the castle. He is martyred by Titus when it is discovered he is a spy.
- Emir El Aziz (based on the historical Al-Aziz Muhammad, portrayed by Mehmet İncı) – The Ayyubid Emir of Aleppo. He is the older brother of Leyla Sultan, and the grandson of Selahuddin Eyyubi. He is manipulated by the Templars into oppressing the Kayıs, before Ertuğrul reveals the truth to him. He foresaw his own impending death at the end of season 1, and does not reappear.

==== Season 2 ====
- Aytolun Hatun (Evrim Solmaz) – The second wife of Korkut Bey and the stepmother of Tuğtekin Bey. Offscreen, she murdered Duru Hatun in order to marry Korkut as part of her plan to make her brother, Gümüştekin, the margrave of the Turkmen tribes. Aytolun constantly argues with Selcan and succeeds in making everyone think she is still evil, including her husband. However, the truth about Aytolun is eventually revealed. Later, she is killed by Abdurrahman Alp after he shot an arrow when she attempts to kill Halime.
- Gümüştekin Bey (based on the historical Gazi Gümüshtigin, portrayed by Mehmet Polat) – Older brother of Aytolun and father of Goncagül Hatun. A close friend of Sadettin Köpek, he seeks to become the Uç Bey, or margrave, of the Turkmen tribes in the region of Erzurum. He seeks to marry his daughter to Gündoğdu to further his plans. He is eventually caught by Ertuğrul, Sungurtekin, and Tuğtekin, with the help of Selcan and Banu Çiçek, for having Korkut Bey poisoned and is beheaded by Ertuğrul.
- Goncagül Hatun (Zeynep Kızıltan) – Daughter of Gümüştekin, niece of Aytolun. She falls in love with Gündoğdu and nearly marries him to further her father's goals, although the plot is undone by Hayme and Ertuğrul. Has tense relationships with Selcan. After her truth is revealed, she eventually escapes and falls in love with Noyan, leading to her collaborating with Sadettin Köpek and Noyan, wanting to get revenge on her father and aunt. She is killed by Gökçe.
- Korkut Bey (Hüseyin Özay) – Older brother of Hayme, father of Tuğtekin, adoptive father of Banu Çiçek and uncle of Ertuğrul. Widower of Duru Hatun and husband of Aytolun. Bey of the Dodurga tribe, he admires his nephew Ertuğrul and is torn in picking sides between Ertuğrul and his own son, Tuğtekin. Is said to have had two other sons, both martyred by Mongols. He is manipulated by his wife, Aytolun, and is eventually fatally poisoned by her.

==== Season 3 ====
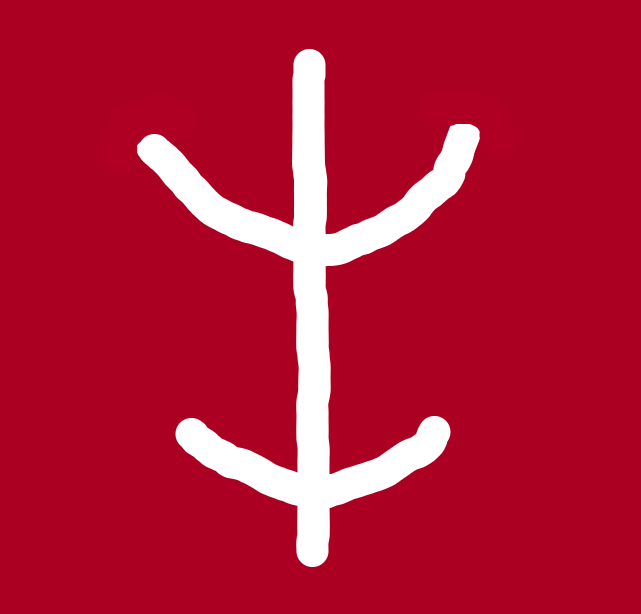
Flag of the Çavdar tribe

- Hancı Simon (transl. Innkeeper Simon) (Lebip Gökhan) – The brother of Maria, a poison expert and doctor, and the local master of the public market (Hanlı Pazar), disguised as a Byzantine but is actually a Templar wanting to kill Ertuğrul for what he did to Petruccio Manzini and Titus. He works under the Templar alias 'Vaftizci Yahya' (transl. Baptist Yahya/John the Baptist). Ural kills him to cover his tracks.
- Candar Bey (loosely based on the historical Yaman Candar, portrayed by Erden Alkan) – The bey of the Çavdar tribe. Candar is the father of Aliyar Bey, Ural Bey, and Aslıhan Hatun, and the older brother of Bahadır Bey. Initially supports Ertuğrul for his own benefit but then turns against him after Ertuğrul refuses to marry Aslıhan. He dies while trying to save Ural from being beheaded at Hanlı Pazar.
- Çolpan Hatun/ Ekaterina (Gülçin Santırcıoğlu) – Ural's devious wife and the daughter of a former Byzantine tekfur who was killed by Helena's father and Vasilius. She acts as if she had converted to Islam after marrying Ural but is actually still a Christian. She seeks to kill Vasilius to avenge her father. After she becomes pregnant, once Ural is dead, she is killed in Nicea under mysterious circumstances. She is only mentioned by Sadettin Köpek.

==== Season 4 ====
- Mahperi Hatun (based on the historical Mahperi Hatun, portrayed by Sinem Öztürk) – The wife of Sultan Alaeddin and mother of Gıyaseddın. She is of Greek origin and is a tekfur's daughter. Mahperi seeks to make her son sultan in order to increase her influence in the Selçuk palace, even collaborating with Köpek, and has the Sultan killed in this cause. She has an intense dislike for the Sultan's other wife, Melike Hatun, and her son, Kiliçarslan. She later begs for forgiveness and repents. She presumably died offscreen before season 5.
- Bahadır Bey (Ertuğrul Postoğlu) – Younger brother of Candar Bey, father of Sancar and husband of Karaca Hatun. Is similar in character to his nephew, Ural. Bey of his own branch of the Çavdar tribe, he is a veteran of wars in the east, and seeks to become the bey of both Çavdar tribes, causing problems for Aslıhan and Turgut. He works with Ares and the Byzantines to overthrow and imprisons Aslıhan, he is beheaded by Ertuğrul after Sancar looses his nerve and tries to kill Ertuğrul. Not to be confused with Bahadır Bey from Kuruluş: Osman.
- Titan (Ogün Kaptanoğlu) – A Byzantine commander and best friend of Ares. Kidnaps Gündüz and spies on Kayı tribe under the name 'Darius'. Later kills Samsa Alp, allies with Komutan Angelos, and receives letters from Marya after her marriage to Artuk Bey. Is killed by Turgut Bey. A similar character, 'Komutan Flatyos', appears in Kuruluş: Osman.
- Kaledar Günalp Bey (Engin Öztürk) – Son of Tayı Bey and adoptive son of Sadettin Köpek. A kaledar (castle commander) of the Selçuks, he occupies Karacahisar and is initially hostile to Ertuğrul, wishing to serve the state in the same manner as his father. However, it is later revealed that his family was murdered by Köpek, causing him to ally himself with Ertuğrul. Is given sovereignty over Karacahisar as an Uç Bey through a Selçuk decree and with Ertuğrul's consent. Is not shown or mentioned after season 4.
- Sultan Alaeddin Keykubat (based on the historical Kayqubad I, portrayed by Burak Hakkı) – The Sultan of the Selçuk Sultanate of Rum. He is the father of Şehzade Gıyaseddin (who later becomes sultan) and Şehzade İzzettin Kılıçarslan, the husband of Mahperi Hatun and Melike Hatun, and the brother of Şehzade Numan and Şehzade İzzetin, both of whom he disputed the throne with. He is highly respected among the Turkmen tribes, making Ertuğrul an Uç Bey, but is manipulated by Emir Sadettin and eventually killed after being poisoned indirectly by him. He is mentioned again in Kuruluş: Osman.

==== Season 5 ====
- Komutan Alıncak (based on the historical Alinjak, a Mongol commander of Ilkhanate and Hulagu Khan's general; portrayed by Engin Benli) – A Mongol commander known for his cruelty and for assisting Albastı against Gündoğdu's tribe. He carries a whip, using it to severely wound Mergen, who uses that whip to take revenge on him. He is constantly humiliated in front of Hulagu by Ertuğrul, as he unwittingly falls into nearly all of Ertuğrul's traps. He is usually laughing and is the blood brother of Arikbuka. Alıncak is eventually killed by Ertuğrul when he and Dragos attempted to kill Bamsı and Aybars.
- Osman Bey (based on the historical Osman I, the founder of the Ottoman Empire; portrayed by Emre Üçtepe) – The third and youngest son of Ertuğrul and Halime. Younger brother of Gündüz Alp and Savcı Bey. He has dreams of his grandfather Süleyman Şah and aspires to maintain the honour of the Kayı tribe. His father tries to rein him in, but he has a clear vision and is hard to control. Features in various prophetic dreams of Ertuğrul, Hayme, and Halime before his birth. Is taught by the Imam of Söğüt. He also features as the main protagonist in the sequel, Kuruluş: Osman, where he is portrayed by Burak Özçivit.
- Gündüz Alp (also known as Gündüz Bey) (based on the historical Gündüz Alp, the son of Ertuğrul; portrayed by Yaman Tümen (seasons 3–4) and Arif Diren (season 5)) – The eldest son of Ertuğrul and Halime, the older brother of Savcı and Osman. A brave child growing up, blinding Tekfur Ares in one eye when he was kidnapped. He aspires to be like his father and is protective of his younger brothers. Gündüz is the best friend of Çağrı, a boy who lives in Söğüt and thus is suggested not to be a Kayı. He becomes somewhat brash as he grows up, making various errors. He falls in love with Prenses İrene (transl. Princess Irene) (Rümeysa Arslan), the daughter of Tekfur Yannis of Lefke Castle, who later leaves when she seeks to find her father's killer after he is killed by Komutan Dragos. She is not shown or mentioned in Kuruluş: Osman. Gündüz returns in Kuruluş: Osman, portrayed by Emre Basalak.
- Sırma Hatun (based on the historical Sırma Hatun, portrayed by Öykü Çelik) – The youngest daughter of Umur Bey and the younger sister of Beybolat and İlbilge. Is vengeful, cold, bossy, and calculating, and is loyal to her brother, bearing a hatred for her older sister, even deciding to marry Taskun Bey for her own benefit and in revenge against her sister after Beybolat's death. She was stabbed by İlbilge after she fatally poisoned her.
- Mergen (disguised as Eynece) (Ali Bühara Mete) – A Mongol warrior who serves Baycu Noyan and Alangoya, pretending to be Alangoya's brother and a master hunter under the name 'Eynece'. Later becomes a Muslim and serves Ertuğrul Bey. He indirectly causes Noyan's death at the hands of Hulagu Han. He later becomes Ertuğrul's spy in the Mongol camp, along with Turgut. He is martyred by Arıkbuka, along with Dumrul Alp, in Arıkbuka's ambush.

== Minor characters ==
=== Multiple seasons ===
- Samsa Alp (based on the historical Samsa Çavuş; portrayed by Melih Özdoğan) – Loyal alp of Tuğtekin and later Ertuğrul. Is the most noble and righteous of Tuğtekin's alps. Later migrates to the west with Ertuğrul and becomes good friends with Dumrul, Günküt, and Bamsı, and is loyal to Turgut as his chief alp. Is martyred by Titan whilst trying to protect the Kayıs' catapults in season 4. Not to be confused with Kuruluş: Osman's Samsa Çavuş, although they are both based on the same historical figure.
- Dumrul Alp (namesake of Deli Dumrul, a character from the Book of Dede Korkut, whose story was referenced by Bamsı Beyrek in season 3; portrayed by Edip Zeydan) – A Kayı alp and later an alp of Ertuğrul's. Hayme Hatun's bodyguard in season 2. Migrates to the western border and becomes good friends with Günküt, Bamsı, and Samsa. Later becomes Ertuğrul's spy, under the name 'Polin', in Karacahisar, along with Haçaturyan Usta. Is martyred in a Mongol ambush in season 5. Not to be confused with Kuruluş: Osman's Dumrul Alp.
- Günkut Alp (Hakan Serim) – A Kayı alp and later an alp of Ertuğrul's. Refuses to support Hamza in defecting to Noyan in season 2. Migrates to the western border and becomes good friends with Dumrul and Bamsı. He likes to joke, particularly with Bamsı. Appears throughout the series, but is not shown or mentioned in Kuruluş: Osman.
- Melikşah Alp (Melikşah Özen) – One of Ertuğrul's alps. Migrates with Ertuğrul to the western border. Is mostly seen with Dumrul, Günküt, and Bamsı. Appears throughout the series, but is not shown or mentioned in Kuruluş: Osman.
- Hamza Alp (Tolga Sala) – Gündoğdu Bey's alp. Is captured by Kara Toygar, along with Gündoğdu, in season 1. In season 2, after being falsely accused of treachery by Gündoğdu and Tuğtekin, he is angered and defects to Noyan's army. He is later captured by Gündoğdu, with the help of Abdurrahman, although he repents and helps Gündoğdu capture Noyan. Is martyred by Noyan when fighting against him.
- Göktug (Arda Öziri) – A Seljuk soldier and Sadettin Köpek's right-hand man. He assists Köpek in all of his wrong-doings including poisoning Turgut and Aslihan. He treats Köpek's as his father. Is killed by Ertuğrul when he tries to kill Ares. Not to be confused with Kurulus: Osman's Göktuğ Alpbaşı.
- Derviş İshak (Gökhan Karacık) – A derviş and İbn-i Arabi's most trusted and loyal companion. He stays with the Kayı tribe on İbn-i Arabi's orders, from season 2. He later becomes a doctor, along with Artuk Bey, and a teacher of children. He is martyred in Ares's ambush.

=== Season 1 ===
- Leyla Sultan (Büşra Çubukçuoğlu) – El Aziz's younger sister. Falls in love with Ertuğrul after he saves her uncle Şahabettin but later backs off after she realises Ertuğrul's love for Halime.
- Akçakoça Bey (Hamit Demir) – The Kayı doctor in Season 1 and one of Süleyman Şah's friends. He disappears after collecting some herbs, the truth being that the actor was fired from the show for taking part in a video commemorating a Gezi victim.
- Şehzade Numan (Sedat Savtak) – Father of Halime and Yiğit, younger brother of Sultan Alaeddin. An exiled Selçuk prince who is persecuted by Kara Toygar and the Templars, he later allies with El Aziz to overthrow his brother and become the sultan. He is killed for this by Afşin Bey on Kara Toygar's orders.
- Şehzade Yiğit (also known as Yiğit Alp) (Burak Temiz) – Younger brother of Halime, the son of Şehzade Numan and the nephew of Sultan Alaeddin. Best friend and blood brother of Dündar. Spent many years in exile with his father and sister, before integrating into the Kayı tribe. Is captured first by the Templars and later by Noyan, both times along with Turgut Alp and forming a strong bond with him. After foiling a plan by Sadettin Köpek and Baycu Noyan to overthrow Sultan Alaeddin, he is martyred in Köpek's ambush, which devastates his sister.
- Nâsır (Burak Çimen) – A Templar spy and El Aziz's right-hand man and commander. Frequently attempts to force the Kayıs out of Ayyubid lands and conspires against Vizier Şahabettın Tuğrul and Ertuğrul. Is killed by Ertuğrul after being caught.
- Elyas Fakih (Fahri Öztezcan) – The imam of the Turkic Kayi tribe during the 13th century. He led the beys in prayer during their headquarters meetings, and he also analyzed dreams, including Suleyman Shah's dream that Ertugrul had shot him in the heart with an arrow on the same night as Karatoygar's threatening visit to the Kayi camp.
- Afşin Bey (loosely based on the historical Afshin Bey; portrayed by Turgut Tunçalp) – A loyal agent and commander of the Selçuk State, who works together with the Kayıs, helping them defeat Kara Toygar and the Templars, although later allies with Kara Toygar and kills Şehzade Numan, angering Ertuğrul. Is said to have committed suicide out of guilt in Konya.
- Kara Toygar (Can Kahraman) – A powerful, tyrannical Selçuk commander. Seeks to capture Numan, Yiğit, and Halime to increase his political influence, and works together with the Templars. Is captured by the Kayıs, although is later freed by Titus. Later allies with Afşin Bey and has Numan murdered. Is said to have been killed under mysterious circumstances; only mentioned by Titus.
- Izadora (Dilek Serbest) – The daughter of Ömer and sister of Elenora, Petruccio's niece. Is saddened by her sister's death, prompting her to protect Yiğit. When she learns the truth about her father, she meets him and helps Ertuğrul and the Kayıs. When she is caught she stabs Petruccio with a poisonous dagger given to her by Kardinal Thomas. She is then hanged in prison.
- Dadi Ümmülhayr (Aysegül Issever) – The aunt and mother figure to Emir Al-Aziz and Leyla Sultan. She is in charge of many of the castle duties. She is also a good doctor and takes care of Halime in the castle when the latter was shot by an arrow. She shares a strong bond with Leyla and takes cares deeply for her. She is sent to prison for helping Ertuğrul but is released when Al-Aziz learns his mistake.
- Mario (Erol Tasci) – Petruccio's right-hand man. Is often seen delivering messages to Petruccio sent by the pigeons. He later tells the truth about Ömer to Izadora because he could no longer hide the secret. Later commits suicide to cover his tracks.
- Ömer (Iskender Altin) – The father of Izadora and Elenora and the brother of Petruccio. He accepts Islam from Ibni Arabi which makes his brother angry and fakes his death by imprisoning him. He secretly helps Ertuğrul and the Kayis through Izadora.
- Eftalya (Zeynep Aydemir) – A Templar spy in Aleppo, disguised as El-Aziz's servant and love interest under the fake name 'Esma'. She frames Vizier Şahabettın for a poisoning. She is thought to be dead when apparently immolating herself, but it is later revealed that she had burned another woman. Continues plots against the Seljuks and Ayyubids with the Templars. She is not shown or mentioned after season 1.
- Elenora (Özlem Aydin) – The younger sister of Izadora and daughter of Ömer, Petruccio's niece. Titus's love interest. She is killed by Petruccio's men when she finds the truth about her father, which leaves her sister devastated.

=== Season 2 ===
- Turalı Alp (Bogaçhan Talha Peker) – A young boy, orphaned after his parents are killed by Mongols. Later adopted by Deli Demir, and is devastated upon the latter's death, later put in Artuk Bey's care. Forms a close relationship with Turgut as they share loss. Not shown or mentioned after season 2. Not to be confused with Kuruluş: Osman's Kanturali Alp.
- Ulu Bilge Saman (Çaglar Yigitogullari) – A shaman and very close and faithful companion of Noyan's. He remains on Noyan's side when Tangut takes control of Noyan's soldiers. He has the ability to talk to spirits. Is killed by Turgut.
- Bogaç Alp (Atilla Kiliç) – He was a loyal alp of Tuğtekin but later becomes a traitor due to Gümüştekin's death. After Gümüştekin was killed, he helps Emir Sadettin Köpek and Noyan. He had a major role in the martyrdom of Tuğtekin, Gökçe, and Yiğit. He is killed by Turgut when he tries to kill Ertuğrul and Gündüz.
- Tangut (Muharrem Özcan) – Noyan's most trusted soldier, is eager to kill Ertuğrul after he escapes the first time they capture him. Later on, he turns against Noyan and seeks to become the commander of Ögedei's army. Is killed by Sungurtekin after he killed Deli Demir.
- Geyikli (Kaptan Gürman) – A man who lives in a cave in a forest. Saves Ertuğrul and heals him. Later his cave becomes shelter for Ertuğrul and his alps, an injured Tuğtekin and Yiğit. Is seen migrating with Ertuğrul's tribe but is not shown or mentioned after season 2.
- Kocabaş Alp (Evren Erler) – Tuğtekin's alp who secretly serves Noyan. He has difficult relations with the Kayı alps, especially Doğan Alp. His betrayal is eventually revealed after Noyan and the Mongols ambush Tuğtekin. He is eventually beheaded by Ertuğrul when he falsely accuses him of killing Tuğtekin.

=== Season 3 ===
- Acar Bey (Renan Karagözoğlu) – Father of Günyeli Hatun and Ural's closest ally. A greedy Çavdar bey, he always sides with Ural, causing problems for Aliyar. He uses his daughter to manipulate Dündar into revealing important information, leading to Doğan Alp's death. Is killed by Ertuğrul at the Kayı camp.
- Günyeli Hatun (Nazlı Yanılmaz) – Daughter of Acar Bey. Pretends to fall in love with Dündar, manipulating him into revealing information and serving her father. Tricks Dündar into causing Doğan's death. Is killed by Dündar at the Kayı camp.
- Kutluca Alp (Mehmet Pala) – Candar Bey's bodyguard and later Aliyar Bey's alp. Is loyal to Ertuğrul and Aliyar. Becomes the Alpbaşı (transl. chief alp) of the Çavdar tribe after Aliyar becomes the bey. Is martyred by Ural during his coup.
- Haçaturyan Usta (Gökhan Bekletenler) – An Armenian former goldsmith and slave. Is saved from Ural's barbarity by Ertuğrul. He spies in Karacahisar for Ertuğrul, under the name 'Alvin', along with Dumrul. He is killed by Ural after he is revealed to be a spy.
- Batuhan Alp (Osman Albayrak) – Ural Bey's main alp and the lover of Aslihan Hatun. He helps Ural in the latter's plans, in exchange for getting Aslihan as his bride. He is blamed for Ural's misdeeds when Ural gets caught. Is shocked to know that Ural and Candar Bey are giving Aslihan's hand to Emir Sadettin Köpek and thus kidnaps her. Is killed by Ertuğrul when he tries to kill Aliyar.
- Maria (Sedef Sahin) – Simon's younger sister and an expert in poisoning. She fell in love with Turgut when she first saw him, took him to an inn when he was sick, and took good care of him. She prepared poisons to kill Toktamis Bey and Ertuğrul. She is killed by Turgut with her own poisonous dagger, when she attempts to kill him.
- Amanda (Elif Sümbül Sert) – A seller of perfumes in the Hanli Bazar. She is Ural's love and he promises to marry her if she helps him in his deeds after taking over Hanli Bazar. She is caught by her friend Maria and sent to Ertuğrul for having hired men to capture Halime and Aslihan and injure Gündüz. Is killed by Ural to cover his tracks when she is freed.
- Petrus (Firat Topkorur) – A loyal servant of Simon and later, Vasilius. Is disguised as a Muslim merchant in the Hanali Bazar to spy for Simon on traders, such as Ertuğrul and Ural, under the fake name 'Tüccar Hasan'. After the conquest of Hanli Bazar, he flees to Karacahisar Castle to get help from Vasilius. He is lied to and killed, along with Laskaris, by Vasilius in Hanli Bazar in front of Ertugrul to save Ural and for him to shoulder the blame for the death of Tekfur Andros.
- Teo (Janbi Ceylan) – When Bamsi was caught and sent to the Karacahisar Castle, he was purposely put in the same dungeon with Teo, who is a murderer hired by Vasilius. He did not realize that it was Vasilius's plan to send Teo later to kill him. Teo killed several Bey's in order to aid Vasilius. Teo was later caught in a trap set by Ertugrul and taken back to the tribe to be executed by Bamsi.

=== Season 4 ===
- Komutan Kostas (transl. Commander Kostas; portrayed by Hakan Bozyiğit) – Ares' commander and later the chief commander of Karacahisar Castle. Is possibly the father of Kuruluş: Osman's Flatyos. He has a black cross on his uniform, unlike the red cross worn by his fellow Byzantine soldiers and commanders. He is killed by Ertuğrul during the latter's conquest of Karacahisar.
- Marya (Sera Tokdemir) – Ares' lover and, later, wife of Artuk Bey. Is a former slave-girl who was given to Ares by the slave trader Simko, for the purpose of spying on him. Ares later kills Marya's younger brother, devastating her and causing her to side with Ertuğrul and marry Artuk Bey. However, she later betrays the Kayıs by sending information to Titan and Angelos. After she is caught by Artuk Bey, she was placed in the dungeons and not killed as she was pregnant. Later, she was rescued by Emir Sadettin and was placed as his spy in Bilecik Castle. Is killed by Tekfur Kritos after her spying is revealed.
- Simko (Levent Sülün) – A slave trader who kidnaps Ertuğrul to use him for his plans for Ares. He gives Ares a slave called Marya, to spy on him. Is killed by Ares when he was caught.
- Sancar Bey (Gürbey İleri) – The son of Bahadır Bey and stepson of Karaca Hatun. He often cannot control his anger. He hates people who disrespect his father. He has tense relations with Turgut and often fights with him. Is later killed by Ertuğrul for attempting to kill him.
- Karaca Hatun (Aslıhan Güner) – Bahadır Bey's wife and Sancar's mother. Is very devious like her husband and supports him in every matter. Has tense relations with Aslıhan and is later killed by her when she attempts to kill Ertuğrul to avenge her husband and son.
- Komutan Angelos (Hakan Onat) – Tekfur Kritos's son. Is sent to help Titan after the conquest of Karacahisar. He later kidnaps Hafsa and Aslıhan. Is beheaded by Bamsi.
- Atsiz Bey (Orhan Kılıç) – A Seljuk spy who saves Ertuğrul from Simko. He becomes Ertuğrul's spy in Karacahisar Castle, given the task of being the merchant 'Tuccar Niko'. Plays a major role in the conquest of Karacahisar. He is later martyred by Ares after he is caught spying on the latter's hideout.

=== Season 5 ===
- Süleyman Alp (Halit Özgür Sarı) – The son of Gündoğdu Bey and Selcan Hatun and the elder brother of İltekin. He came with his mother to Ertuğrul's tribes after Albastı's attacks. Süleyman has a strong friendship with his cousin and Ertuğrul's son, Gündüz Alp, but is killed by Beybolat Bey when Ertuğrul takes back his town in revenge, much to his mother's devastation.
- Savcı Bey (based on the historical Saru Batu Savcı Bey; portrayed by Kerem Bekişoğlu) – The second son of Ertuğrul and Halime, younger brother of Gündüz Alp and older brother of Osman Bey. Shows a keen interest in science, spending time with Artuk Bey. He returns in season 2 of the sequel, Kuruluş: Osman, portrayed by Kanbolat Görkem Arslan.
- Aybars (Enes Göçmen) – The son of Bamsi and Hafsa and younger brother of Aslihan. He also shows an interest in science, making him good friends with Savci. He chooses studies over swords which annoys Bamsi. He and his sister and the sons of Ertuğrul share a close bond. Is kidnapped by Albasti but is later saved. Is shown as a grown up man in the sequel, Kuruluş: Osman, portrayed by Serhan Onat
- Aslihan (Çagla Naz Kargi) – The daughter of Bamsi and Hafsa and older sister of Aybars. She and her brother and the sons of Ertuğrul have a close bond. Is named after her late paternal aunt Aslihan Hatun due to Hafsa's great friendship with her. Is mentioned to have died between Dirilliş: Ertuğrul and Kuruluş: Osman with her mother in a plague.
- Prenses İrene (transl. Princess Irene) ( Rümeysa Arslan) – The daughter of Tekfur Yannis of Lefke Castle, and Gündüz's love interest. She secretly meets Gündüz and even makes him hide in the castle. After her father's death, she takes shelter with the Kayi tribe but later leaves to find her father's killer without telling anyone.
- Ataç Bey (Armagan Oguz) – Umur Bey's and, later, İlbilge Hatun's bodyguard. Is killed by Beybolat Bey in Söğüt for not being able to protect his father, Umur Bey.
- Yınal Alp (Şafak Baskaya) – Beybolat Bey's closest friend and his bodyguard. He is a very good alp. He is later killed by Bamsi.
- Tekfur Yannis (Enis Yıldız) – Tekfur of Lefke Castle and Irene's father. He supports Ertuğrul and allies with him to learn who Dragos is. Is later killed by Lais when he identifies Zangoç as Dragos.
- Komutan Lais (Aytek Sayan) – The commander of Lefke Castle and Dragos's spy. He kills Tekfur Yannis and learns Irene's secrets through Maria. Eventually his real identity is revealed, and he is finally beheaded by Ertuğrul in Söğüt.
- Komutan Subutai (Hüseyin Gülhuy) – Alıncak's bodyguard. He is a very fierce Mongol commander and raids the Kayı tribe along with his master. Is killed by Turgut and his head is sent to Alıncak in Söğüt.
- Mengü Hatun (Esra Balıkci) – İlbilge Hatun's assistant. She is calm and friendly. She sent messages sent by Ertuğrul to İlbilge Hatun when Alıncak took over the tribe. She appears throughout the season, mainly near İlbilge Hatun.
- Emre Erçil as Arikbuka – a dangerous and bloodthirsty Mongol spy. Alincak's blood brother, he makes his appearance after Beybolat's identity as "Albasti" is discovered, rescuing him from being captured by Ertugrul's soldiers. Later, he allies himself with Beybolat to obtain the gold of the Kayi, ambushing Ertugrul, where in addition to kidnapping him, they kill Dumrul and Mergen, and leave Turgut on the verge of death. After Ertugrul assassinates Beybolat, Arikbuka establishes an alliance with Sirma, Beybolat's sister, influencing the election of the new bey of Umuroğlu, as well as plotting the kidnapping of Berke Khan in order to advance on the Anatolian tribes. However, Ertugrul foils Arikbuka's plans and ends up slitting his throat.

== Horses ==
- Ertuğrul: Alkagtoli - White (S1-5)
- Halime: Sultan (gifted to her by Ertuğrul) - Brown (S1-4)

== Guest characters ==
Notable characters who have made guest appearances in the series:

Guest cast

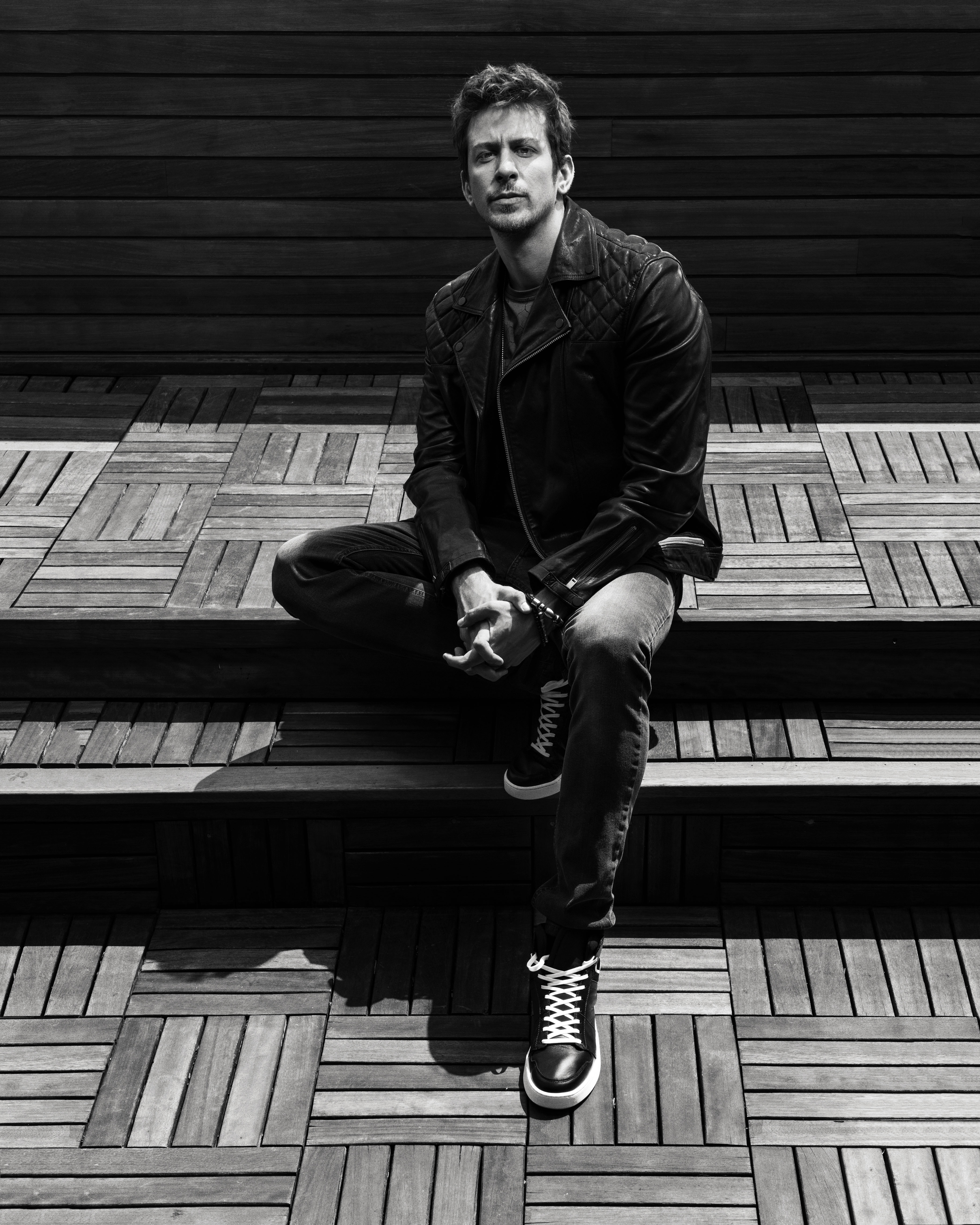
Birand Tunca, who plays Bisol
- Bisol (Birand Tunca) – Titus's younger brother; he was taking a captured Şehzade Numan and his family to Templar Castle but was stopped and killed by Ertuğrul, making Titus thirst for Ertuğrul's blood.
- Alptekin Bey (Diler Öztürk) – Father of Gökçe and Selcan, killed by Süleyman Şah for betraying him. Appears in Selcan's visions, telling her to kill Süleyman Şah.
- Toktamış Bey (loosely based on the historical Tokhtamysh, a leader of the Blue Horde; portrayed by Demir Parscan) – Blood brother and companion of Candar Bey. Is poisoned to death by Ural, with the help of Simon, to increase Ural's influence with the Çavdar tribe.
- Mahmout Dervish (Shabbir Jan) – A dervish who helps Ertuğrul Bey find a place on the Byzantine border; not shown after Season 2.
- Sheikh Edebali (Imran Bakshi) – Son of Mahmout Dervish, a young boy entrusted to Islam. Appears as a sheikh in Kurulus Osman.
- Sügay Hatun (Oya Unustası) – Osman's milk mother, who came to the Kayı tribe from a distant Turkmen tribe. Ertuğrul was out mourning Halime's death and the lack of milk for his son while she was out mourning her son's death. After she came to the Kayı, her tribe attempted to kidnap her multiple times but was saved by Alangoya. She is neither shown nor mentioned in Season 5, and therefore it is thought that she died, or her problems with the other tribe were resolved, or she returned after Osman was able to live without her milk.
- Alangoya/Almıla Hatun (Gönül Nagiyeva) – The sister of Baycu Noyan. Is sent by her brother to infiltrate the Kayı under the false name of 'Almıla Hatun'. She tries to kill Osman and cause chaos among the Kayı. Nagiyeva described her as "difficult to love", saying "she truly believed in her mission". Alangoya is eventually killed by Hayme Hatun.
- Atabey Ertokuş (based on the historical Mübarizeddin Ertokuş; portrayed by Onur Senay) – One of Sultan Alaeddin's most trusted men, he sided with Ertuğrul when it was rumoured among the Dodurga tribe that Ertuğrul was a traitor. After he is captured by Mongols, Ertuğrul rescues him; he is about to give important information to Ertuğrul when he is shot by an arrow by Tangut and martyred.
- Melike Hatun (Gizem Anci) – Sultan Alaeddin Keykubat's second wife and Şehzade İzzettin Kılıçarslan's mother. Stepmother of Şehzade Gıyaseddin. She is an Ayyubid princess. She, along with her son, is killed by Altun Aba, on Mahperi Hatun's and Emir Sadettin Köpek's orders, when they were coming to Konya.
- Tekfur Andros (Ali Çakalgöz) – The Tekfur of Karachisar Castle and the father of Helena. He sees Vasilius as his son. Is very proud of Ertuğrul after the latter's alps save Helena. Is killed by Laskaris in the Hanli Bazar on Vasilius's order.

== See also ==
- List of Diriliş: Ertuğrul episodes
- List of Kuruluş: Osman characters
- List of awards and nominations received by Diriliş: Ertuğrul
