= Halime Hatun =

Suggested mother of Osman I (13th century)

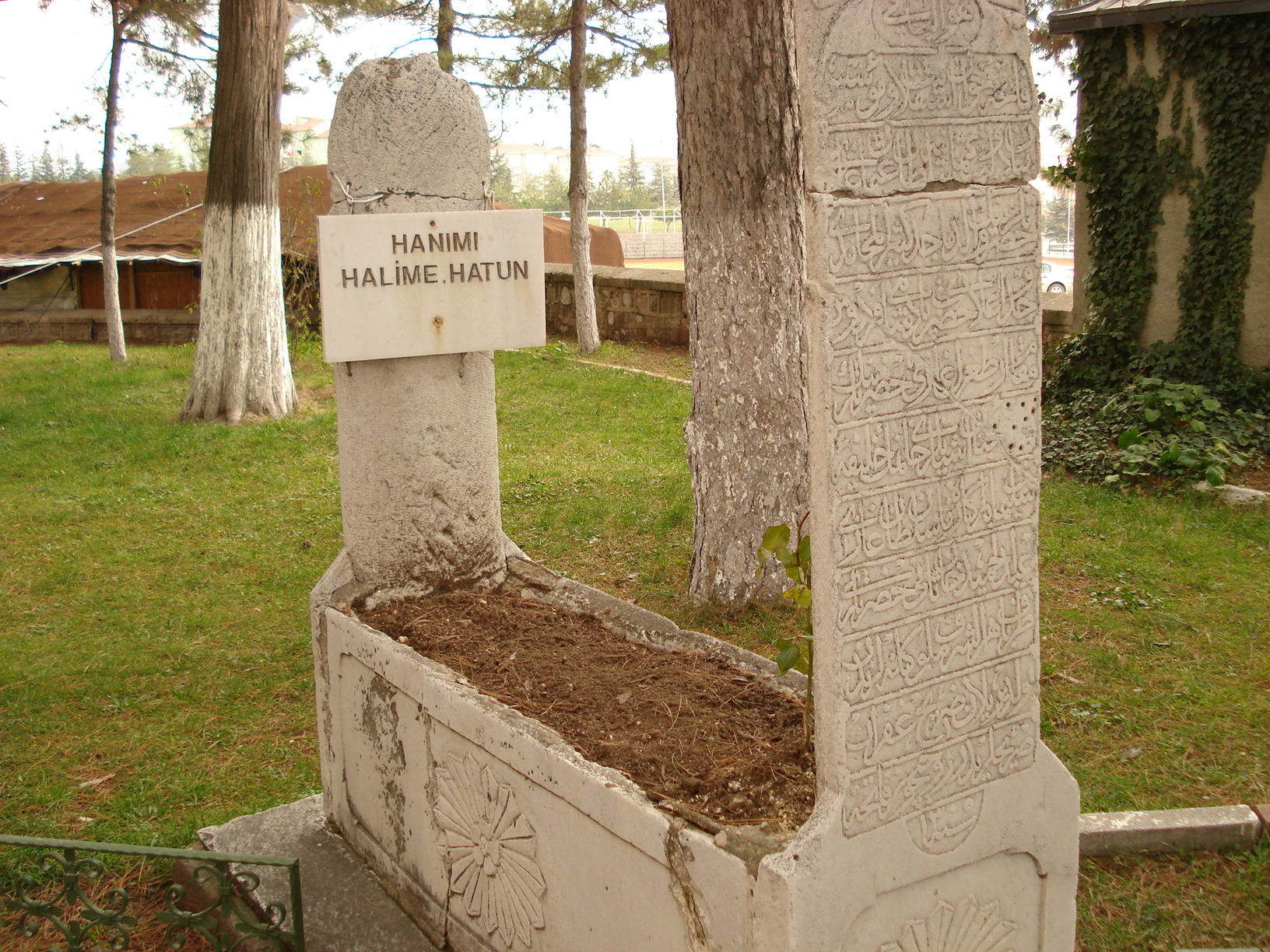
- Grave of Halime Hatun in Söğüt
- Born: Unknown
- Died: after 1281
- Burial: Söğüt
- Spouse: Ertuğrul (disputed)
- Issue: Gündüz Alp (possibly); Saru Batu Savcı Bey (possibly); Osman I (possibly)

Halime Hatun (Ottoman Turkish: حلیمه خاتون, "the patient/gentle one") was, according to Ottoman folklore, the wife of Ertuğrul (fl. 13th century) and the mother of Osman I.

== Biography ==
Her origins are unknown. She is sometimes referred to as "Hayme Ana" in later legends, and is not mentioned at all in any historical Ottoman texts. Hayme Ana is also a traditional name of Ertuğrul's mother.

Historian Heath W. Lowry, among other Ottoman scholars, states that Osman I's mother is unknown. The burial place of Halime Hatun, which was added in the late 19th century by Sultan Abdul Hamid II, is located in the garden of the Ertuğrul Gazi's grave in Söğüt, present-day Turkey. According to historian Cemal Kafadar, the 19th century "recovery" and "rebuilding" of this tomb by the Sultan, with the name added later, was politically motivated. Additionally, according to author Turgut Güler, "Hayme Ana", buried in Domaniç, was most likely the wife of Ertuğrul.

== In popular culture ==
Esra Bilgiç appeared as Halime Hatun in the Turkish TV series Diriliş: Ertuğrul. In the show, she is depicted as a Seljuk princess and the wife of Ertugrul and mother of his sons, including Osman I.

== See also ==
- Halime Hatun Kümbeti, 14th century tomb built for a woman with the same name (Turkish Wikipedia)
- Ottoman dynasty
- Ottoman family tree
- List of mothers of Ottoman sultans
