= Artuk Bey (Diriliş: Ertuğrul) =

Fictional character

- Diriliş: Ertuğrul character
- Ayberk Pekcan as Artuk Bey
- First appearance: "Bir Karış Toprak Vermeyiz" (2015)
- Last appearance: "Diriliş" (2019)
- Based on: Artuk Bey (homage)
- Adapted by: Mehmet Bozdağ
- Portrayed by: Ayberk Pekcan

In-universe information
- Position: Bey; Kaledar
- Affiliation: Kayı tribe; Dodurga tribe; Aksakals (Note: also known as the "White Beards".)
- Weapon: Sword
- Spouse: Marya Hatun
- Religion: Islam
- Nationality: Seljuk; Oğuz Turkish

Artuk Bey is a fictional character in the Turkish TV series Diriliş: Ertuğrul where he is portrayed as the main protagonist, Ertuğrul Bey's right-hand man. The character is portrayed by Ayberk Pekcan and is based on the Seljuk commander Artuk Bey.

== Background ==
Artuk Bey was born in an urban area. He studied medicine at Samarkand from Ibn Sina (Avicenna) and learned speech-skills from Imam Maturdi (Source: Episode 115); before moving to the Dodurga tribe out of a desire to help the poorer nomads of Anatolia. He is shown to have not married for years. He is loyal to his tribe's Bey, Korkut, is the tribe's doctor and does anything for it along with being a well-respected Bey there.

=== Personality ===
Artuk Bey is extremely loyal to whoever is his tribe's Bey. Along with being well-respected due to his profession, he is trustworthy with all things business-related which leads to him being not only trusted with the Public Market, but Karacahisar and even his tribe.

The TRT 1 website states about his character; "When Ertuğrul Bey is not in the tribe, he continues to be loyal to him, leads his tribe and continues to serve as a physician in it too. He also helps him with the business of the market." In the fifth season, he was blinded due to Emir Bahattin's men who were searching for a chest, however, he could still treat people and retained the ability to effectively use medicines.

== Storyline ==
=== Season 2–3 ===
Artuk Bey makes his first appearance in the second season and is shown as a doctor and physician of the Dodurga tribe. After the Kayıs are forced into the Dodurgas after a Mongol invasion, Artuk is shown to admire Ertuğrul and as he notices his achievements and his struggle, he takes him to the Aksakals, an organisation seeking justice, which Ertuğrul becomes a member of. Artuk Bey also attempts to stop the devious Aytolun from giving energy syrup to the Dodurga Bey and her wife, Korkut, which was harmful for him and eventually leads to his death. Following the arrival of Ertokuş and Ertokuş' death, who Artuk is surprisingly shown to worry for, and Aytolun's death after she mishandles Ertuğrul's sister-in-law Selcan, the Kayı along with Artuk move to the Western borders separating from Ertuğrul's elder brothers. After Ertuğrul's conquest of the Hanlı Pazar in the third season, Artuk is made in-charge of the place and he also becomes the tribe's doctor, working alongside his student, Derviş İshaak, who was also one of İbn-i Arabi's dervishes. Artuk Bey is also the cause of the revelation that the Çavdar tribe's Bey Candar's blood-brother Toktamış was innocent and that he was poisoned to attack his brother. At the end of this season, in the new Tekfur of Karacahisar, Tekfur Ares' ambush, Artuk is severely injured and Ertuğrul ends up being kidnapped by slave-traders.

=== Season 4–5 ===
Following Ertuğrul being thought-dead after him being kidnapped by the slave-traders, his younger brother, Dündar, seeks to become the Bey, in which he succeeds after defeating Artuk, who was also a candidate in the elections. Musa Ali Shah The Pakistani was also a member or the kayi tribe. After Ertuğrul conquers Karacahisar, defeating the Byzantines' continued traps for him, even kidnapping Ertuğrul's son, Gündüz, Artuk is made the Kaledar (in-charge) of Karacahisar Castle. Artuk marries Marya, Ares' former lover, who does anything for money, even betraying her husband by spying for Titan. As the traitor in the Selçuk palace, Sadettin Köpek, causes more and more problems as time passes, he sends Günalp, his adoptive son, who is unaware of his father's devious plans, to Karacahisar, where he occupies the castle and imprisons Artuk, even attempting to hang him, only being stopped by Ertuğrul. Following the deaths of Marya and Köpek, and Günalp being made the new Kaledar by Ertuğrul after the truth is revealed, the Kayı move to Söğüt where the fifth season starts. In this season, Artuk Bey isn't shown as frequently, but when Artuk, who is well known to be Ertuğrul's right-hand-man, is shown to know one of Ertuğrul's major secrets, for which the notorious Beybolat Bey tortures Artuk and has him blinded by Batur Alp, although Artuk refuses to reveal the secret. Beybolat is eventually killed by Ertuğrul, whilst the blinded Artuk is later assisted by İlçin Hatun on a daily basis. He is not shown or mentioned in Kuruluş: Osman, and is therefore assumed to have died offscreen, due to his old age.

== Positions ==
Artuk Bey was one of the Beys of the Dodurga tribe and the tribe's doctor. After migrating with Ertuğrul, there were times where he became the substitute Bey, even running for the tribe's Bey elections against Ertuğrul's brother Dündar Bey, who tried to sell Hanlı Pazar (transl. Public Market) and leave the region of Bithynia, undoing Ertuğrul's previous efforts, after it was thought that Ertuğrul was dead. He was also the Kayı doctor after the migration along with being the Kaledar of Karacahisar.

Beys of the Kayı tribe (in fiction)

Kaya Alp
Süleyman Şah (Note: Kurdoğlu also briefly became the Bey during Süleyman Şah's rule by force.)
Hayme Hatun
Ertuğrul Bey (Note: Dündar became a substitute Bey for a while when Ertuğrul was captured by Simko along with Artuk Bey who also became the substitute Bey for a while. Later, Sungurtekin Bey became the substitute Bey whilst Ertuğrul was imprisoned by Gıyaseddın.) (Note: Dündar Bey and Gündüz Bey became the substitute Beys while Ertuğrul was in Konya, whilst during Ertuğrul's reign, Samsa Çavuş also ruled a separate part of the tribe but isn't included for it was only shown for a period of time and therefore isn't notable.) (Note: Yavlak Arslan and his Çobanoğlu tribe originated from the Kayı who divided their tribe from Ertuğrul's following Hüsamettin Çoban's desire offscreen, mentioned by Arslan Bey.)	Gündoğdu Bey
Osman Bey	Unknown (Note: Possibly İltekin Bey, Sungurtekin Bey or Sungurtekin's son.)

Notes:

Tekfurs of Karacahisar (in fiction)

Ekaterina's father
Tekfur Andros (Note: Helena's father, his name was mentioned at her wedding.)
Tekfur Vasilius (Note: Ekaterina is briefly granted privileges over the castle by the Byzantine Emperor after Vasilius' death.)
Tekfur Ares
Position abolished (Note: The castle is conquered by Ertuğrul, and therefore Artuk Bey is placed in-charge as a representative of Ertuğrul as Uç Bey, followed by Günalp Bey as an Uç Bey.)

== Historical basis ==
Artuk Bey is based on the 11th century Seljuk commander with the same name who lived at the same time as Diriliş: Ertuğrul's Süleyman Şah. In Resurrection Ertuğrul, Artuk Bey is presented as a member of the Dodurga tribe of Oghuz Turks, however, historically he was a member of the Döğer tribe. Like many other characters in the second season, he is just another historical personality being paid homage to.

== Reception ==
Artuk's character is admired by many for his alliance with the protagonist and how he, as a doctor, saved many of their favourite characters' lives. As Diriliş: Ertuğrul was well received in Pakistan, Ayberk Pekcan, along with Nurettin Sönmez, who plays the role of Bamsı Beyrek, arrived in the country to meet fans in 2020 on a three-day visit. They came with Turkish Foreign Minister Mevlüt Çavuşoğlu and a 20-member delegation. On their visit, they met Pakistani actor Hamza Ali Abbasi's sister Dr. Fazeela Abbasi and Nurettin Sönmez was "humbled" by Pakistani Prime Minister Imran Khan's appreciation for Diriliş: Ertuğrul while also expressing his desire to work with Pakistani actors. On the occasion, Ayberk Pekcan said, "...Pakistan and Turkey are brotherly countries, people of both countries are also brothers and Pakistan is our second homeland..." Before leaving, they also visited the Pak-Turk Maarif Chak Shahzad Campus, in Islamabad and their visit to Pakistan was "thanked" by Pakistani politician Faisal Javed Khan. Pekcan is also staying in touch with the Kuruluş: Osman cast, the sequel to Diriliş: Ertuğrul, sharing an image with them on Instagram. In 2016, Pekcan also won the Golden Palm Awards in the category Supporting TV Series Actor of the Year for his role as Artuk Bey.

== See also ==
- List of Diriliş: Ertuğrul characters
- List of Kuruluş: Osman characters
