= Domaniç District =

District of Kütahya Province, Turkey

- District
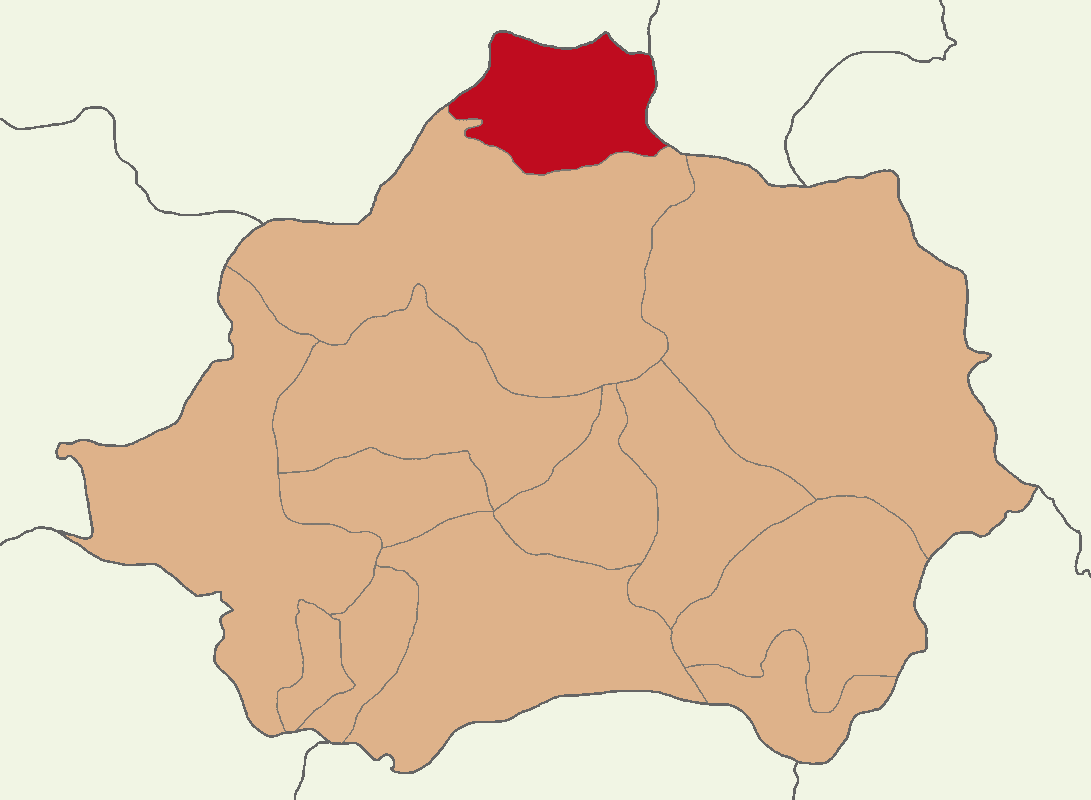
- Map showing Domaniç District in Kütahya Province

- Location in Turkey Domaniç District (Turkey Aegean)
- Coordinates: 39°48′N 29°37′E
- Country: Turkey
- Province: Kütahya
- Seat: Domaniç

Government
  - Kaymakam: Muhammed Furkan Okumuş
- Area: 539 km^{2} (208 sq mi)
- Population (2022): 14,174
  - Density: 26/km^{2} (68/sq mi)
- Time zone: UTC+3 (TRT)
- Website: www.domanic.gov.tr

Domaniç District is a district of the Kütahya Province of Turkey. Its seat is the town of Domaniç. Its area is 539 km^{2}, and its population is 14,174 (2022).

== Composition ==
There are two municipalities in Domaniç District:

- Çukurca
- Domaniç

There are 30 villages in Domaniç District:

- Aksu
- Berçin
- Böçen
- Bükerler
- Çakılköy
- Çamlıca
- Çarşamba
- Çokköy
- Domaniçerikli
- Domaniçkaraköy
- Domaniçkozluca
- Domur
- Durabey
- Fındıcak
- Fıranlar
- Güney
- Karamanlar
- Kırık
- Kozcağız
- Küçükköy
- Muhacirlar
- Muratlı
- Ortaca
- Safa
- Sarıot
- Saruhanlar
- Seydikuzu
- Soğucak
- Tıraz
- Yeşilköy
