= Saru Batu Savcı Bey =

Brother of Osman I (died 1286)

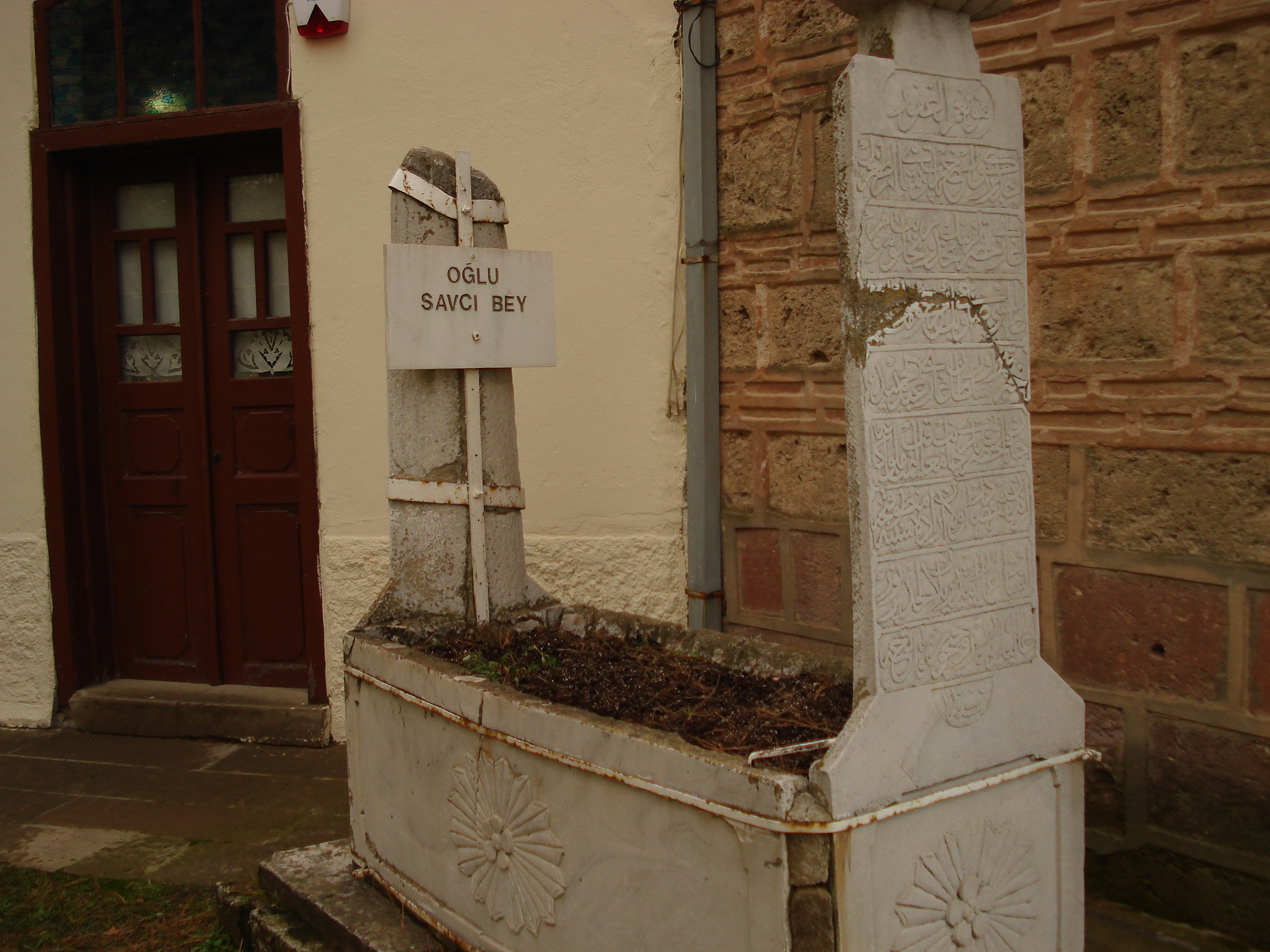
- Tomb of Savcı Bey in Söğüt
- Born: 1249; Domaniç
- Died: 1286 (aged 36–37); Domaniç
- Cause of death: Killed in battle
- Resting place: Domaniç, Söğüt
- Spouse: Avna Hatun
- Children: Koca Saruhan Bey; Suleyman Bey
- Parent(s): Ertuğrul Gazi (father); Halime Hatun (mother)
- Relatives: Hayme Hatun (grandmother); Suleyman Shah or Gündüz Alp (grandfather); Gündüz Alp (brother); Osman I (brother)

Saru Batu Savcı Bey (1249–1286) was the older brother of Osman I, the founder of the Ottoman Empire. He is known to be the most 'mysterious' of Ertuğrul's children.

== Name ==
It is unknown whether Ertuğrul actually had three or four children and it has confused many historians. This is because of the two names, Saru Batu and Savcı. Some historians combine the two names together while others don't.

At Savcı Bey's mausoleum, there are two graves. One is marked as Saru Batu and another named Savcı, which creates this problem. However, in Ottoman tradition, there is no reference to this at all.

According to another source, Savcı was the nickname/title of Saru Batu. This was the title of someone who was a diplomat or administrator of a tribe. Savcı Bey had this post from the time of his father, Ertuğrul's leadership, and his brother, Osman's leadership.

== Death ==
Saru Batu Savcı Bey died during the Battle of Domaniç which occurred in 1286 before the founding of the Ottoman Empire. It is also known in ancient Ottoman sources as the Battle of the Twins (İkizce Savaşı), also known as the "Battle of Domaniç". The Battle of Domaniç was a major turning point in the founding of the Ottoman Empire. This is why modern Turkish historians consider it the empire's first real war. This is the third Ottoman battle after the Battle of Mount Armenia (Turkish: Cebel-i Ermeniyye) in 1284 and the Siege of Kulaca Hisar at Tavas in 1285.

== Place of burial ==
Sultan Kayqubad I gave Ertuğrul, the village of Söğüt as a winter residence for the Kayı tribe which was warm to them and their animals. He gave them the Domaniç region for when it was cool. Saru Batu Savcı Bey was buried in the village of İkizce in Domaniç, where his grandmother, Ertuğrul's mother, Hayme Ana, was also buried near him in Çarşamba. His tomb was known to people as "Jad Bakr" (Turkish: Bekir'in Dedesi).

== Family ==
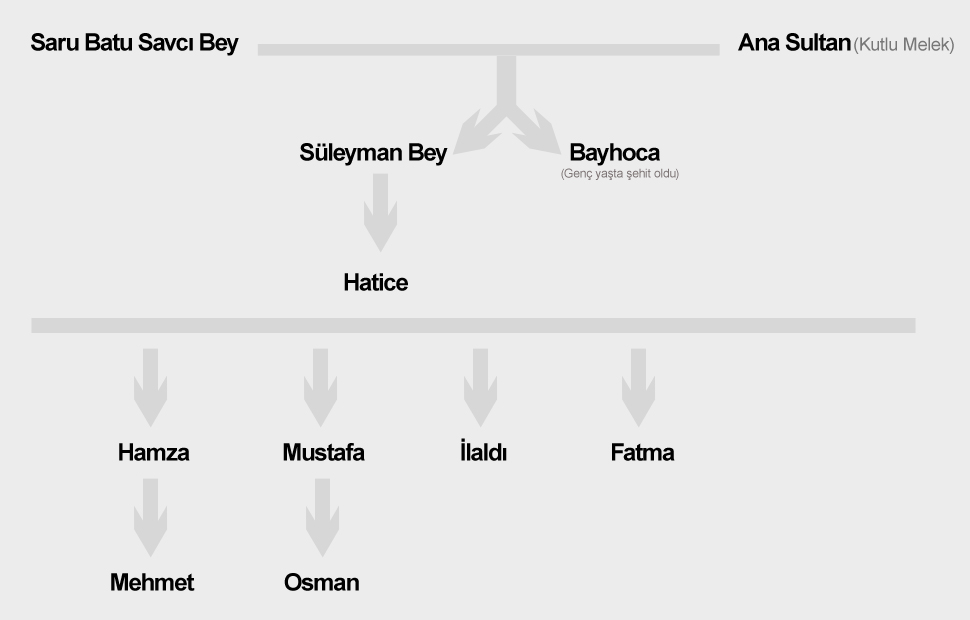
Family tree of Saru Batu Savcı Bey

- Savcı Bey, born to Ertuğrul, married Avna Hatun or Avna Sultan. Because of her having "Sultan" in her name, it is thought she was of some sort of royalty, however, there are no sources indicating this. She loved everyone and treated them equally while being extremely loving towards children, that is how she became Ana Sultan (transl. Mother Sultan). She was also called Kutlu Melek for her kind personality which means "Blessed Angel". Avna became a martyr before her husband before the Siege of Kulaca Hisar. Savcı and Avna had two sons;
  - Saruhan Bayhoca (sometimes called Saruhan Baykoca, Koca Saruhan bey and Hoca Saruhan bey) who died young in 1284, when his uncle Osman decided to face a Byzantine contingent that ambushed him.
  - Süleyman Bey who outlived his parents and brother. He married his cousin Orhan's daughter Hatice Hatun. They had two sons and two daughters:
    - Hamza Bey. He had a son, Mehmed Bey.
    - Mustafa Bey. He had a son, Osman Bey.
    - Ilaldi Hatun.
    - Fatma Hatun.

== Legacy ==
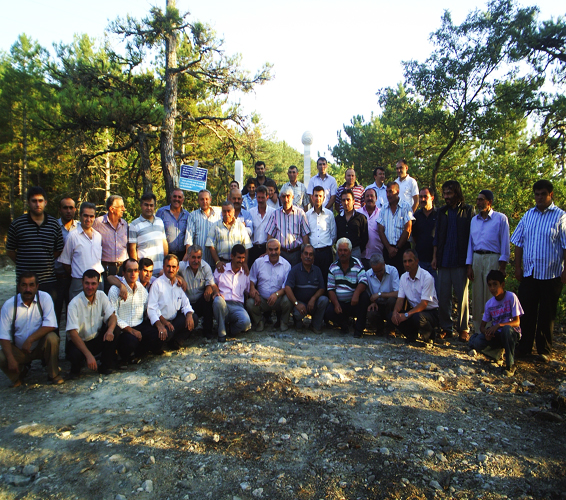
Remembrance celebrations

=== Annual tradition ===
In August, a celebration in memory of him is held in Karaköy in Istanbul, Turkey. In a video from 2019 the description is as follows: “Saru Batu Savci Bey, the son of Ertuğrul Gazi, was commemorated at the tomb of Karaköy in our district in the 732nd year of his martyrdom.” This means he died on 1287 AD, 732 years ago.

=== Poems ===
There are also poems in the works titled “Tevârîh-i Âl-i Osman” (transl. "The Chronicles of the House of Osman") by Ibn Kemal/Kemalpaşazâde (aka Şemseddin Ahmed). These accounts may be unreliable but they mention that he died in the Battle of Domaniç (Turkish: İkizce Savaşı).

=== In popular culture ===
In the Turkish television series Diriliş: Ertuğrul, he is played by the Turkish actor, Kerem Bekişoğlu, and in the sequel to the show, Kuruluş: Osman, he is played by Kanbolat Görkem Arslan.

In Kuruluş Osman, Yağızkan Dikmen appears as Bayhoca. Savcı Bey's wife also appears but is named as "Lena Hatun", portrayed by Seray Kaya.
