= Çukurca, Domaniç =

Çukurca
- Municipality
- Location in Turkey Çukurca (Turkey Aegean)
- Coordinates: 39°46′46″N 29°41′25″E
- Country: Turkey
- Province: Kütahya
- District: Domaniç
- Population (2022): 2,099
- Time zone: UTC+3 (TRT)

Çukurca is a town (belde) in the Domaniç District, Kütahya Province, Turkey. Its population is 2,099 (2022).
