= Evrim Solmaz =

Turkish actress (born 1972)

- Born: 27 August 1972 (age 54); Ankara, Turkey
- Education: Hacettepe University Ankara State Conservatory
- Occupation: Actress
- Years active: 1995–present
- Spouse: Arda Şener (m. 2013)
- Children: 1

Evrim Solmaz (born 27 August 1972) is a Turkish actress, best known for her role as Zeliş Taşdelem in the Turkish drama-comedy series Umutsuz Ev Kadınları. She appeared also in Hanim Çiftliği as Gülizar and Diriliş: Ertuğrul as the villain Aytolun Hatun.

== Early life and career ==
Solmaz was born in Ankara, Turkey on 27 August 1972. She began her formal training in 1990 at the Hacettepe University State Conservatory, Department of Theatre, completing her four‑year education in 1994. After graduation she moved to Istanbul, where she joined the Beşiktaş Cultural Centre and made her professional debut in Yılmaz Erdoğan's musical play Otogargara. She later pursued a master's degree in acting at Kadir Has University, Faculty of Fine Arts.

She performed in the plays Bir İstanbul Masalı, Gümüşsuyu Papatyalar (a one‑woman show), and Çamaşırhane. In 2009 she acted in Kumsal. Evrim Solmaz first appeared on camera in 1995 and is a member of ÇASOD. Her role in cinema includes Kaçiklik Diplomasi (1998), The Chaos Class in the Military (1995), The Masked Gang (2005), Whatever You wish (2005), Shattered Soul (2006) and also in various TV Shows like Karaoglan (2002), Estagfurullah Yokusu (2003), Zerda (2003–2004), Hanımın Çiftliği (2009–2011), Umutsuz Ev Kadinlari (2011–2013), Diriliş: Ertuğrul (2015–2016) and Zengin ve Yoksul (2019).

== Personal life ==
Since 2000, she has been active in martial arts. She practiced kickboxing for four years and, since 2004, has received instructor training in Wing Tzun Kung Fu and Escrima at Ebmas. She married Arda Şener in 2013. The couple had a son in 2014.

== Filmography ==
- Zengin ve Yoksul (2019) – Meral Erdemli
- Diriliş: Ertuğrul (2015–2016) – Aytolun Hatun
- Umutsuz Ev Kadınları (2011–2013) – Zeliha "Zeliş" Taşdelem
- Hanımın Çiftliği (2009–2011) – Gülizar
- Yaban Gülü (2008)
- Yarali Yürek (2007) - Elif
- Shattered Soul (2006) - Maid
- Whatever You Wish (2006) - Young Eftimiya
- The Chaos Class in the Military (2005)
- The Masked Gang (2005)
- Zerda (2003–2004) – Türkan
- Estagfurullah Yokusu (2003)
- Karaoglan (2002) – Yeter Sultan
- Kaçiklik Diplomasi (1998)
- Iliskiler (1997–2001) - Tülay
