= Karacahisar Castle =

Castle in Turkey

- Karacahisar Kalesi
- Eskişehir, Turkey

Site information
- Type: Fortress
- Open to the public: Yes
- Condition: Ruined

Location
- Coordinates: 39°43′58″N 30°26′51″E

Site history
- Built: 12th century
- Built by: Byzantine Empire
- Materials: Stone

Karacahisar Castle, Karaca Hisar Castle or Karajahisar Castle (Turkish: Karacahisar Kalesi, Greek: Κάστρο Καρακαχίσαρ) is a ruined Byzantine castle on a plateau near the Porsuk River, southwest of Eskişehir, Turkey. It stands 1,010 metres (3,310 ft) above sea level, is surrounded by walls, and covers an area of 60,000 square meters.

The castle is integral to the foundation myth of the Ottoman Empire: according to Ottoman friendly chroniclers the castle was taken from the Byzantines in 1288 and it was here that the hutbe was first read in Osman's name. This is, however, unlikely as the region had not been under Byzantine control since latest 1180 and therefore it is more likely that the castle was taken from the Germiyanids but portrayed as a victory against Christians to depict Osman as warrior for the faith.

== History ==
Karacahisar castle might be one of the unnamed forts emperor Manuel Komnenos provisioned in the area around Dorylaion in 1175 prior the rebuilding of Dorylaion. The region fell to the Seljuk Turks a few years later, al-Harawi, who visited Dorylaion in 1177, already referred to the town by a new Turkish name. It was then under control of the Germiyanids who had been brought by the Seljuk sultans to serve against the occasionally rebellious frontier lords and who created a strong domain centred on the city of Kotyaion. Karacahisar was protected access from Dorylaion to Kotyaion and thus was important to the Germiyanids.

According to tradition, the castle was conquered by Ertuğrul Ghazi in 1232 on behalf of Sultan Kayqubad I when the latter had to leave to face the Mongol invasions of Anatolia, preceding Ertugul's settlement in Söğüt. While the castle is celebrated in Ottoman propaganda to have been conquered in 1288 by Osman I (see more below), it is more likely that it was taken in the first years of the fourteenth century as the Germiyanids held Ankara around the year 1300 under the nominal suzerainty of Ala ad-Din Kayqubad III and the control of Karacahisar would have been crucial for that.

In modern times the castle became the side of a radar base but due to its importance in Ottoman history, investigation became possible, first under Prof. Halik Inalcik.

== Osman I's conquest ==
Main Article: Siege of Karacahisar
See Also: Siege of Karacahisar (By Ertuğrul)

=== Ottoman narrative of the conquest ===
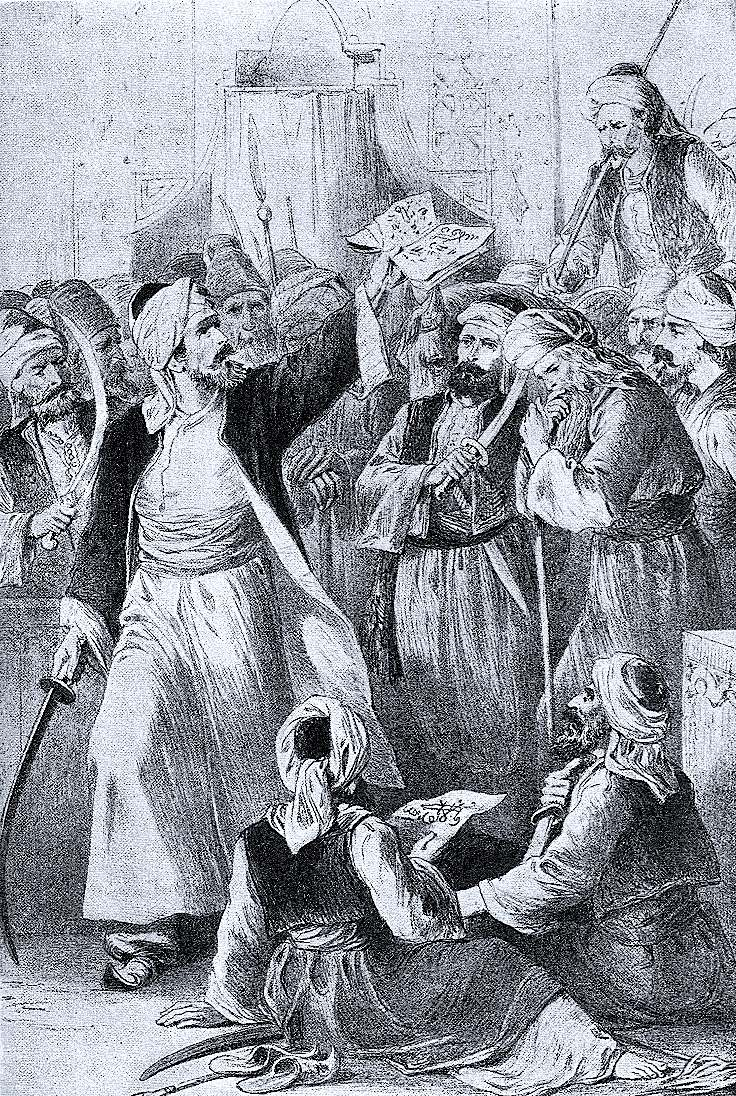
Illustration of Osman rallying his warriors into battle.

According to Ottoman favouring sources, Osman I focused on expending his recently established beylik at the expense of the Byzantine Empire. Indicated by some accounts, attempting to avenge a defeat, Osman I fought a battle against the Tekfur of Inegol, in which he was defeated and forced to withdraw with casualties including his nephew Koca Saruhan bey. Based on this, in the next year, Osman went forward to Kulacahisar at night and managed to conquer it. This triggered the lord of Kulacahisar to ally himself with the lord of Karacahisar and they met the Ottomans in battle at the Ikizce hills. Fierce fighting took place in which Osman's brother Savcı Bey and the Byzantine commander Pilatos were killed but at the end Osman was victorious.

Then, the Ottomans entered Karacahisar where Osman appointed dursun fakih (student of shiekh edebali) Qadi (magistrate) and Subaşı (chief of police) for the newly conquered city. Historians differ in determining the date of this conquest, yet none made it prior to 685 AH / 1286 CE, or exceeding 691 AH / 1291 CE. Osman made his new city a staging base of his military campaigns against the Byzantines, and ordered that his name be delivered at the Friday sermon (khuṭbah), which was the first manifestation of his sovereignty and authority.

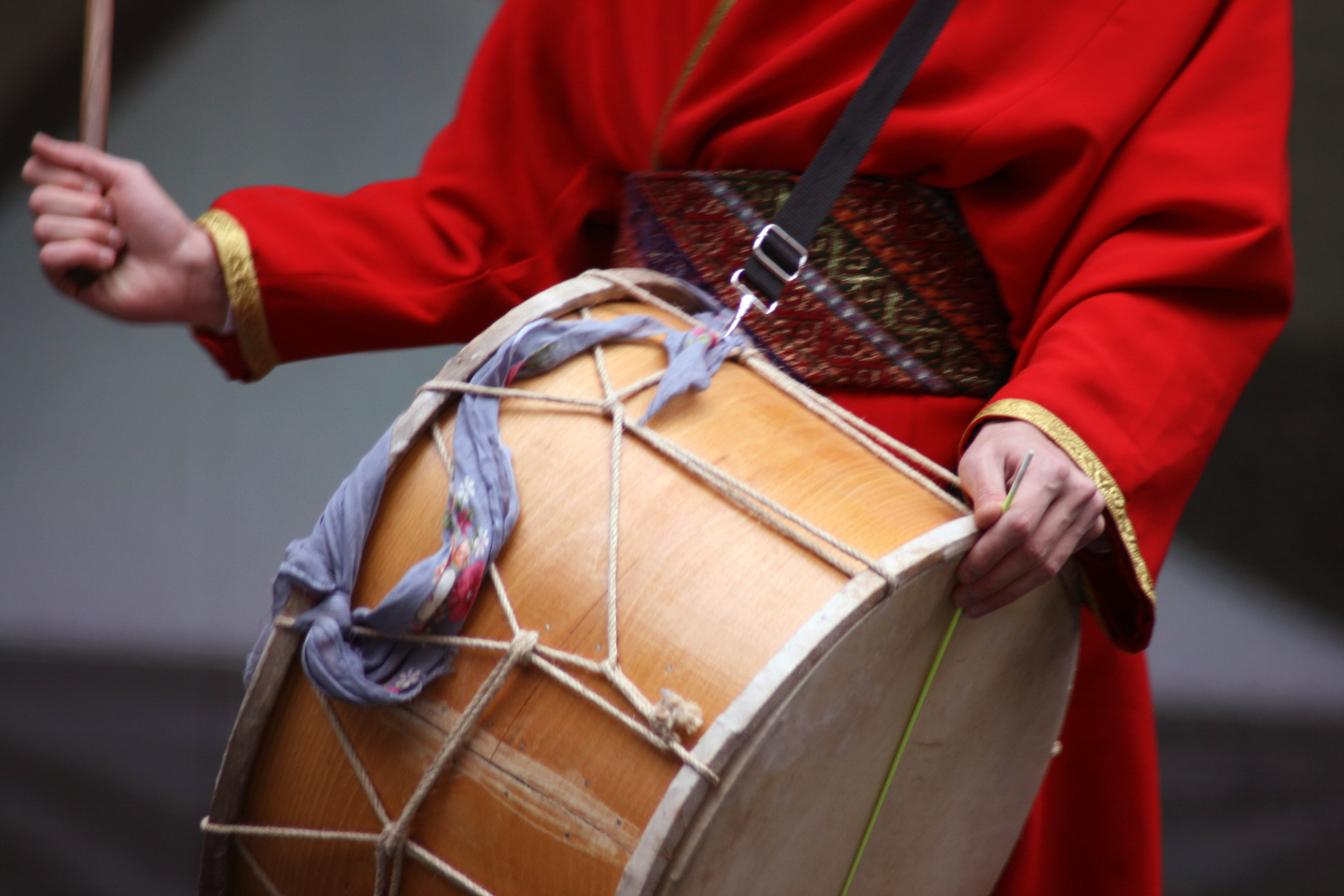
A Mehter war drum, similar to the one sent to Osman from the Seljuk Sultan

Seljuk Sultan Alâeddin Kayqubad III is said to have given Osman the title Ḥaḍrat ʻUthmān ghāzī marzubān 'âli jâh ʻUthmān Shāh (the honourable conqueror and border guardian Osman Shah). Further, he also bestowed upon Osman the governance of all the land he had conquered as well as the towns of Eskişehir and İnönü and exempting Osman from all types of taxes. Finally, Osman also received several traditional gifts reflecting the new high stature to the Seljuk court, including a golden war banner, a Mehter (war drum), a Tuğ (a pole with circularly arranged horse tail hairs), a tassel, a gilded sword, a loose saddle, and one hundred thousand Dirhams. The decree also included the recognition of Osman's right to be mentioned in the Friday khuṭbah in all lands subject to him, and was permitted to mint coins in his name, making him essentially a sultan, only lacking the title.

It is told that when drums were beaten announcing Sultan Kayqubad's arrival, Osman stood up in glorification, and remained so till the march music halted. Since that day, Ottoman soldiers enacted standing in glorification for their Sultan whenever drums were beaten.

=== Critical examination ===
As mentioned earlier, the region around Karacahisar had not been under Byzantine control for around 100 years and thus many early scholars of Ottoman history such as Paul Wittek (1935) or Aldo Gallotta (1993) simply rejected the story as anachronistic. More modern scholars such as Cemal Kafadar, Rudi Paul Lindner or Clive Foss do not fully reject the story and try a more balanced view. They agree that the story is based on a conflict between the Germiyanids and the Ottomans and that the castle was at the time under Germiyanids control. It seems likely that the story attempts to cover the fact that this strategic castle was in the hands of the Germiyanids long after the supposed Ottoman conquest. On the other hand, since the Ottomans tried to emphasise their role as champions of Islam, it was an embarrassment to find themselves fighting Muslims at the beginning of their history.

== See also ==
- Dorylaeum
