= Domaniç =

- Municipality
- Location in Turkey Domaniç (Turkey Aegean)
- Coordinates: 39°48′12″N 29°37′04″E
- Country: Turkey
- Province: Kütahya
- District: Domaniç

Government
  - Mayor: Engin Uysal (CHP)
- Population (2022): 4,855
- Time zone: UTC+3 (TRT)
- Area code: 0274
- Website: www.domanic.bel.tr

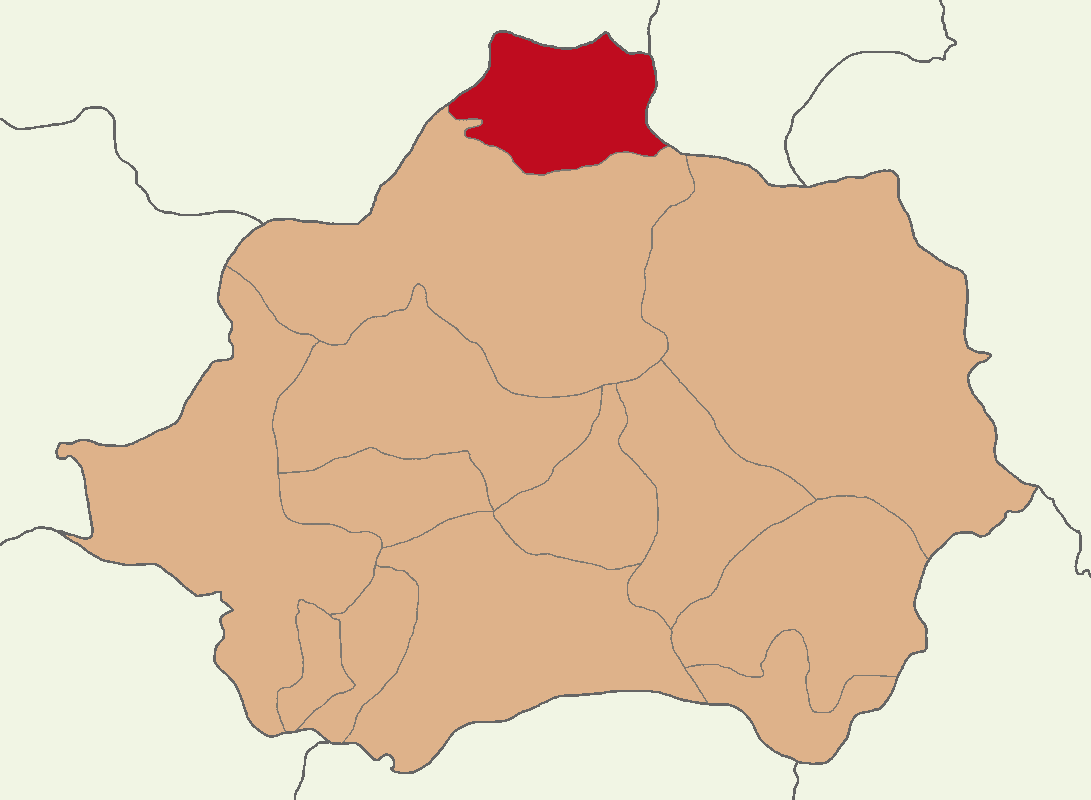

Domaniç is a town in Kütahya Province in the Aegean region of Turkey. It is the seat of Domaniç District. Its population is 4,855 (2022). Ottoman Beylik was founded around Domaniç and Söğüt by Osman I, leader of the Kayi tribe.
