= Söğüt =

Town in Marmara, Turkey

- Municipality
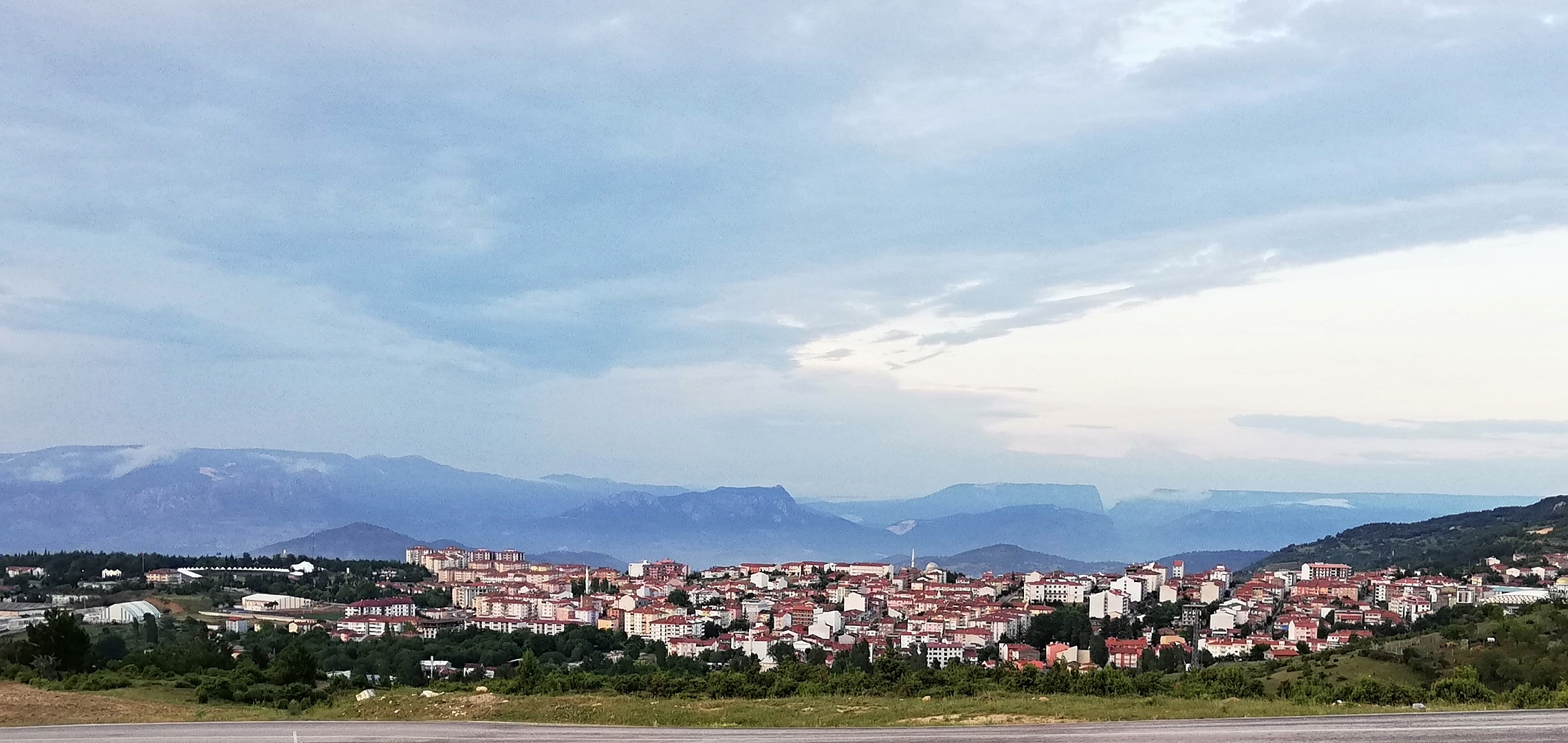

- Location within Turkey Location within Marmara
- Coordinates: 40°1′7″N 30°10′53″E
- Country: Turkey
- Province: Bilecik
- District: Söğüt

Government
  - Mayor: İsmet Sever (MHP)
- Population (2021): 13,566
- Time zone: UTC+3 (TRT)
- Postal code: 11600
- Area code: 0228
- Website: www.sogut.bel.tr

Söğüt (Turkish pronunciation: [sø.ˈ(ɥ)yt], lit. 'willow') is a town in Bilecik Province, Turkey. It is the seat of Söğüt District. Its population is 13,566 (2021). The mayor is İsmet Sever (MHP), elected in 2019.

Söğüt is notable as the founding location and first capital of the Ottoman Empire from 1281 to 1335.

== Name and etymology ==
The name of the settlement is first attested under the Greek name Thêbásion (Greek: Θηβάσιον) in the 13th century. The current name of the town probably comes from a tree in the willow family (Turkish: Söğüt/Söğüt Ağacı) that usually grows near water. Claims that Söğüt/Söğüd was an ancient settlement called Sagouados have not been proven. It is not known exactly when Söğüt emerged as a settlement in the historical process. The history of the Söğüt region, which is stated to have been on the route passed by armies in ancient times, is included in the general history of the Bithynia region, which also includes Bilecik. However, the emergence of this place as a settlement must have occurred in the second half of the 13th century, when the Ottoman Principality settlement was being established. In this regard, one of the common rumors of the early Ottoman historians is that Ertuğrul Gazi, the gentleman of his Kayı tribe, influenced the Seljuk Sultan Alaeddin with his success during the siege of Karacahisar, whereupon Sultan Alaeddin gave Ertuğrul Gazi the valley of the Söğüt, which includes a fertile Declivity between Bilecik and Eskisehir, as a barracks, and the Domaniç mountains as a plateau. Another narrative is that Ertuğrul Gazi came here during his settlement as a frontier lord on the borders of the Seljuk State and fought with the local Byzantine forces and took Bilecik.

== History ==
Claims that Söğüt/Söğüd was an ancient settlement called Sagouados have not been proven. It is not known exactly when Söğüt emerged as a settlement in the historical process. The history of the Söğüt region, which is stated to have been on the route passed by armies in ancient times, is included in the general history of the Bithynia region, which also includes Bilecik. However, the emergence of this place as a settlement must have occurred in the second half of the 13th century, when the Ottoman Principality settlement was being established. In this regard, one of the common rumors of the early Ottoman historians is that Ertuğrul Gazi, the gentleman of his Kayı tribe, influenced the Seljuk Sultan Alaeddin with his success during the siege of Karacahisar, whereupon Sultan Alaeddin gave Ertuğrul Gazi the valley of the Söğüt, which includes a fertile Declivity between Bilecik and Eskisehir, as a barracks, and the Domaniç mountains as a plateau. Another narrative is that Ertuğrul Gazi came here during his settlement as a frontier lord on the borders of the Seljuk State and fought with the local Byzantine forces and took Bilecik. Söğüt, as the place became known, had a kaza centre in the Ertuğrul Sanjak of Hüdavendigâr Vilayet, the centre of which was Bilecik. The kaza centre included present-day districts of İnhisar, İnönü, Mihalgazi, Sarıcakaya and Yenipazar, central and eastern parts of Bozüyük and some villages of Nallıhan and Tepebaşı before World War I.

=== Modern era ===
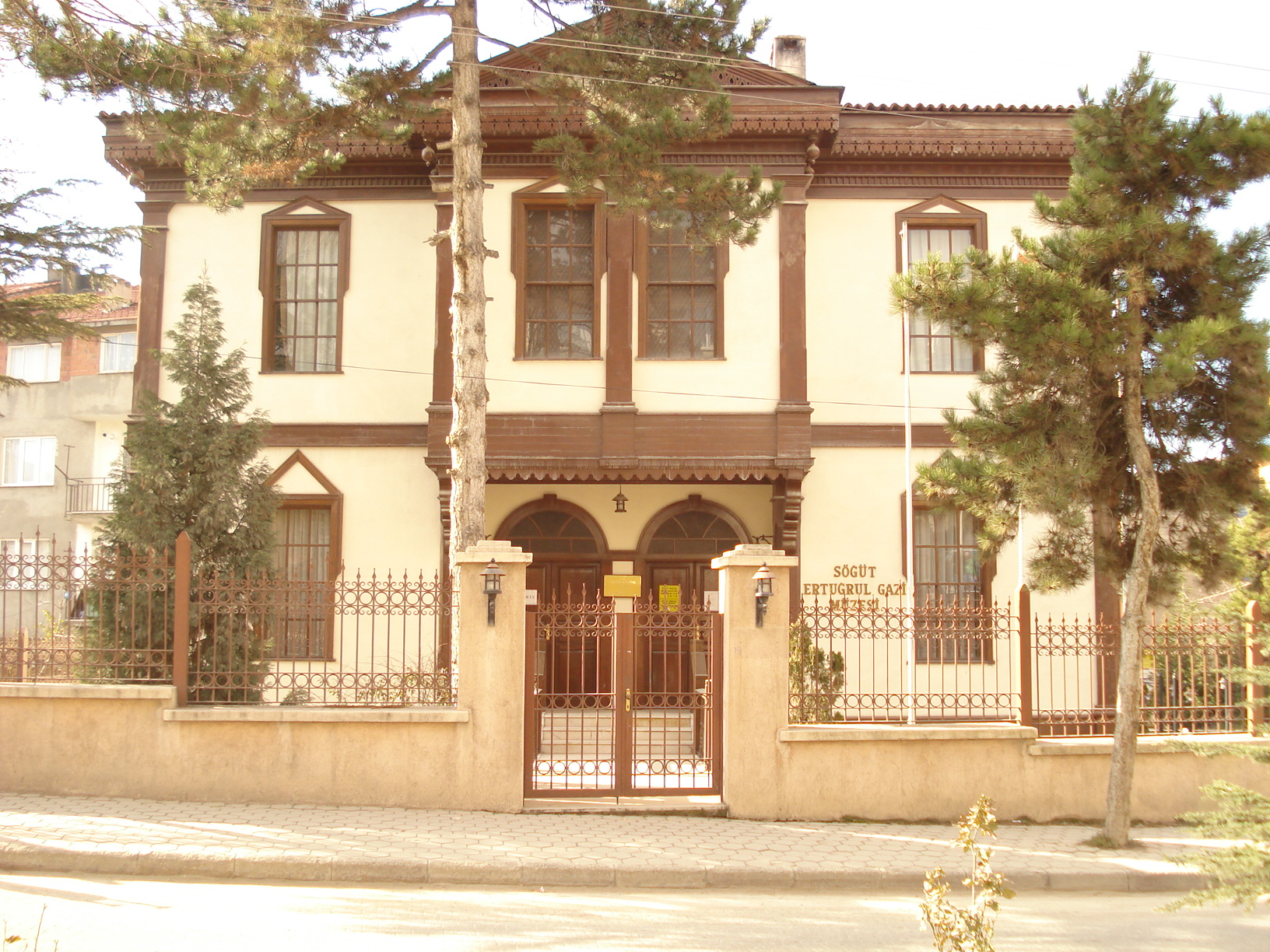
Museum of Ertuğrul Ghazi in Söğüt

Söğüt was occupied three times by the Greek Army during the Turkish War of Independence: 8–11 January 1921, 24 March – 21 April 1921, and 12 July 1921 – 6 September 1922.

Today Söğüt is a small town in the humid river valley of Bilecik Province in Turkey. Turkish history and life-size statues of the Ottoman sultans are exhibited in the Söğüt Ethnographical Museum. It is also the 3rd biggest district center in its province after Bozüyük and Bilecik.

== Sources ==
- Farrell, Brian P.; Fairey, Jack, eds. (2018). Empire in Asia: A New Global History From Chinggisid to Qing. Vol. 1. Bloomsbury Publishing.
