= Gündüz Alp =

Father and/or son of Ertuğrul

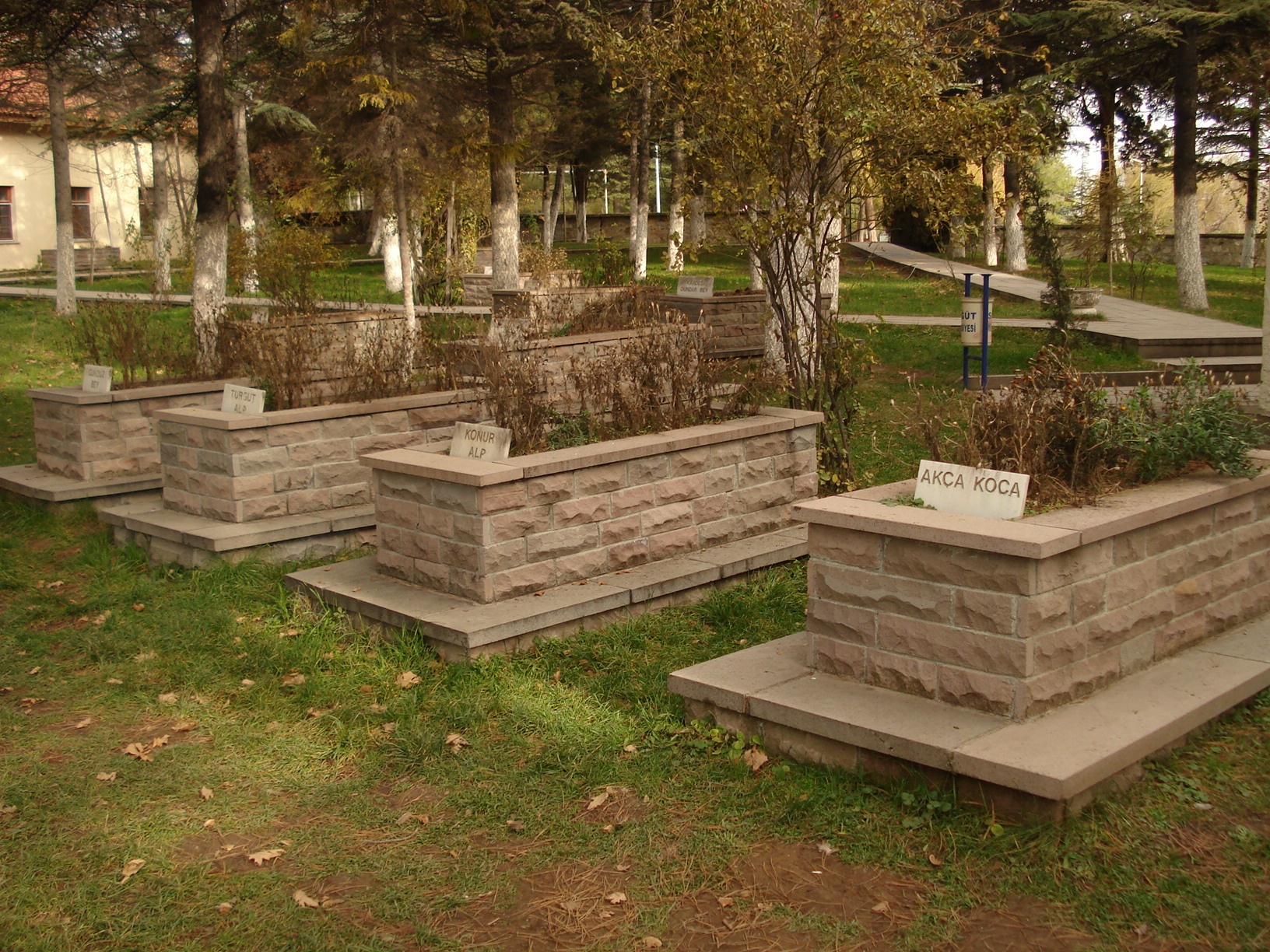
- Tomb of Gündüz Bey (far-left)
- Burial place: Turgutalp (Genci) village, İnegöl, Turkey
- Family: Kayı tribe of Oghuz Turks

Gündüz Alp was the likely father of Ertuğrul (13th century) and grandfather of Osman I, the founder of the Ottoman Dynasty. According to some sources, the name of one of the sons of Ertuğrul was also Gündüz Alp, and thus the brother of Osman I. Ottoman histories, written around the 15th century, differ in details about Osman I's ancestry.

== Gündüz in the family tree of Ertuğrul and Osman I ==
The grandfather of Osman I is mentioned in various sources as Süleyman Şâh, Gündüz Alp and Gök Alp.

According to 15th century Ottoman writers Enveri and Karamani Mehmet Pasha, Gündüz Alp was the father of Ertuğrul. Ottoman writer Yazıcıoğlu Ali's Tevârih-i Âl-i Selçuk (15th century) indicated Gök Alp, the brother of Gündüz Alp as the father of Ertuğrul. Some other writers in their published works like 15th century historians; Şükrullah's Behcetü't Tevârîh, Hasan bin Mahmûd el-Bayâtî's Câm-ı Cem-Âyîn, Âşıkpaşazâde's History of Âşıkpaşazâde, Neşri's Kitâb-ı Cihannümâ and early 16th century Oruç Bey's Tevârîh-i Âl-i Osman had asserted that Suleyman Shah was the father of Ertuğrul. Historian Halil İnalcık argued that the latter have confused Suleyman Shah with the grandfather of Gündüz Alp, namely Mir Süleymân Alp. Three coins which read "Osman bin Ertuğrul bin Gündüz Alp" supports the view that Gündüz was Ertuğrul's father.

Family tree in Yazıcıoğlu Ali's Tevârih-i Al-i Selçuk:

Gökalp
Ertuğrul	Tündar (Dündar)
Osman Gazi

Family tree in Enverî's Düstûrnâme-i Enverî:

Gazan
Mir Süleymân Alp
Şehmelik
Gündüzalp	Gökalp
Ertuğrul
Osman Gazi

Erhan Afyoncu claims that "Mir Süleymân Alp" in the family tree above is the Amir of İznik or Antakya "Suleiman ibn Qutulmish."

Family tree according to Karamani Mehmet Pasha:

Oğuz Han
Kayık Alp
Sarkuk Alp
Gök Alp
Gündüz Alp
Ertuğrul
Osman Gazi

Family tree in Şükrullah's Kitâb-ı Cihannümâ:

Oğuz
Gökalp
Kızıl Buga
Kaya Alp
Süleymanşâh
Ertuğrul
Osman Gazi

Family tree in Hasan bin Mahmûd el-Bayâtî's Câm-ı Cem-Âyîn:

Kaya Alp
Süleymanşâh
Ertuğrul
Savcı Bey	Osman Gazi	Gündüz Bey

Family tree in Âşıkpaşazâde's History of Âşıkpaşazâde:

Oğuz
Kayık Alp
Gökalp
Basuk
Kaya Alp
Süleymanşâh
Ertuğrul
Savcı Beg	Osman Gazi	Gündüz Beg
Bay-Hoca	Ay-Doğdu

Âşıkpaşazâde, in chapter fourteenth of The History of Âşıkpaşazâde, argues that Osman I put forward that he had descended from Gökalp and "Suleiman ibn Qutulmish" the founder of Anatolian Seljuk Sultanate instead of "Süleyman Şah ibn Kaya Alp". According to Erhan Afyoncu, the identity of Süleyman Şah in the Tomb of Suleyman Shah is unidentified. He also defends that the father of Ertuğrul according to the recent investigations is Gündüz Alp.

Family tree in Neşrî's Kitâb-ı Cihannümâ:

Süleymanşâh
Sunkur-Tekin	Ertuğrul	Gündoğu	Tündar (Dündar)
Saru-Yatı	Osman Gazi	Gündüz

=== Father of Ertuğrul ===
Three coins minted by Osman I in Yenişehir-Bursa during his reign which reads "Osman bin Ertuğrul bin Gündüz Alp" showed that the name of the father of Ertuğrul was Gündüz. Many contemporary history professors like İlber Ortaylı, Halil İnalcık, Erhan Afyoncu, Yılmaz Öztuna and Osman Turan demonstrated that those history books written more than six hundred years ago had erred in determining the father of Ertuğrul for some reasons, and had given Ertuğrul's father name incorrectly as Suleyman Shah instead of Gündüz Alp because of the similarity of the name of Kutalmışoğlu Suleyman Shah the founder of Seljuks of Rum, and Osman I's presumed ancestor Suleyman Shah.

=== Son of Ertuğrul ===
According to Hasan bin Mahmûd el-Bayâtî's Câm-ı Cem-Âyîn, Âşıkpaşazâde's History of Âşıkpaşazâde and Neşrî's Kitâb-ı Cihannümâ, the name of one of the sons of Ertuğrul and one of the brothers of Osman I was also Gündüz, who had a son named Aydoğdu Bey and a daughter named Efendize, who married her cousin Orhan. Some other sources also indicate that he had another son, Aktimur Bey who was a soldier and government official in the establishment of the Ottoman Empire. This Gündüz had another brother named Saru-Yatı (Savcı Beg). Osman I may also have had a nephew named Gündüz.

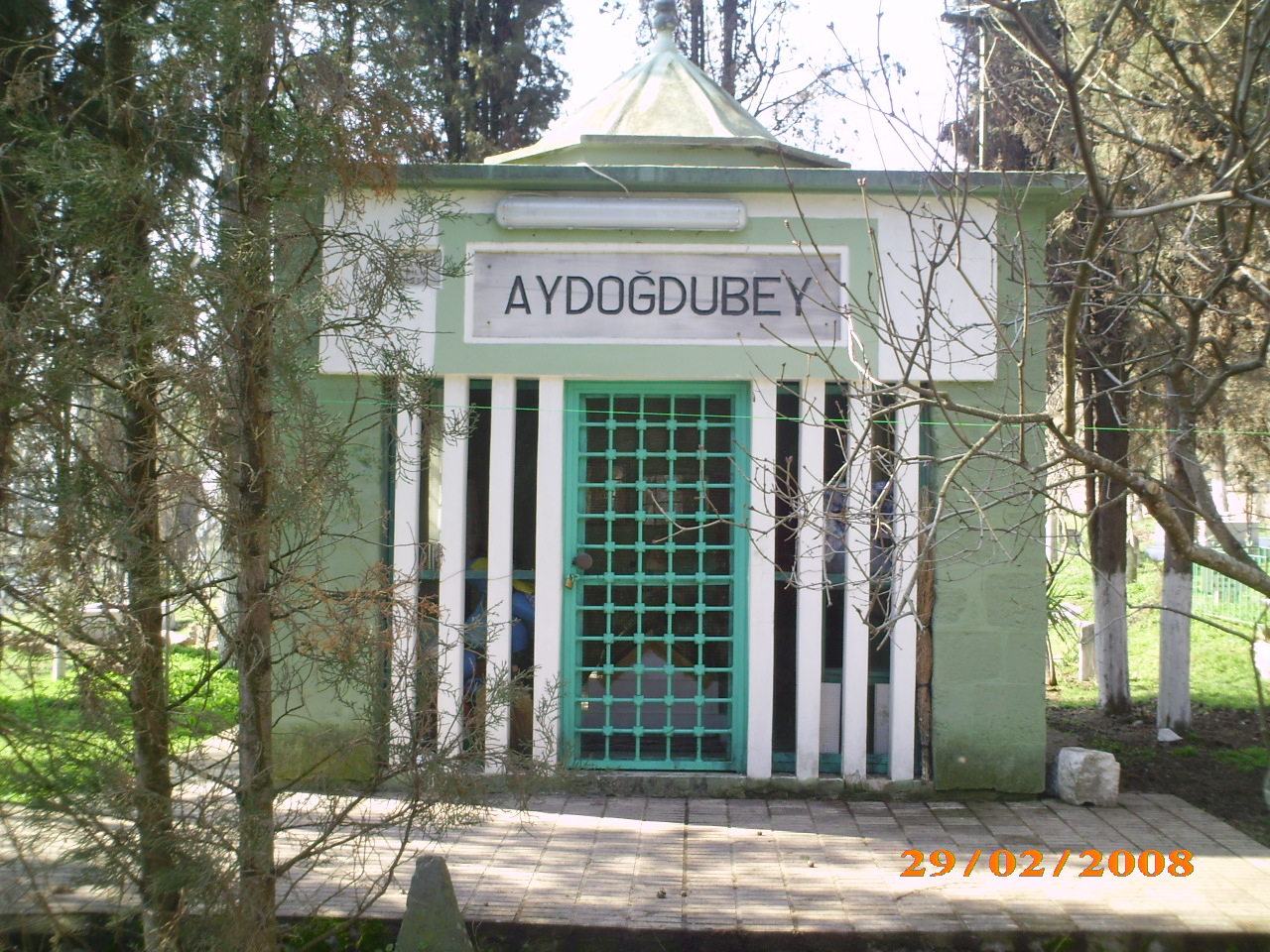
Tomb of Aydoğdu Bey

== In fiction ==
Gündüz Bey, son of Ertuğrul Bey, is a character in the Turkish TV series Diriliş: Ertuğrul and Kuruluş: Osman.

== See also ==
- Ottoman family tree (more detailed)
- Ottoman Empire
