= Suleyman Shah =

Turkish khan, grandfather of Osman I

Suleyman Shah (Ottoman Turkish: سلیمان شاه; Turkish: Süleyman Şah) was, according to Ottoman tradition, the son of Kaya Alp and the father of Ertuğrul, who was the father of Osman I, the founder of the Ottoman Empire. Early Ottoman genealogies disputed this lineage, and either Suleyman Shah or Gündüz Alp could be Osman's grandfather and the father of Ertuğrul. An Ottoman tomb initially in or near Qal'at Ja'bar has historically been associated with Suleyman Shah. He succeeded his father as bey in 1214 when he decided to lead the 50,000-strong tribe west in the face of Mongol invasion. After migrating to the North Caucasus, thousands of Kayis settled in Erzincan and Ahlat in 1214, while some of the other Kayi groups dispersed in Diyarbakir, Mardin, and Urfa.

== Family tree of Suleyman Shah ==
Various sources linked Suleyman Shah to Osman Gazi and his father Ertuğrul:

Family tree in Şükrullah's Behcetü't Tevârîh

Oğuz
Gökalp
Kızıl Boga
Kaya Alp
Süleymanşâh
Ertuğrul
Osman Gazi

Family tree according to Oruç Bey's Oruç Bey Tarihi

Oğuz
Gunhan
Kayı Han
35 generations
Gökalp
Basak
Temür
Sugançaf
Bakı Ağa
Baysunkur
Kayıtnun
Tugar
Akulug Ağa
Iğla
Baytur
Kızıl Buga
Kaya Alp
Süleymanşâh
Ertuğrul
Osman Gazi

Family tree in Hasan bin Mahmûd el-Bayâtî's Câm-ı Cem-Âyîn

Kaya Alp
Süleymanşâh
Ertuğrul
Savcı Bey	Osman Gazi	Gündüz Bey

Family tree in Âşıkpaşazâde's History of Âşıkpaşazâde

Oğuz
Kayık Alp
Gökalp
Basuk
Kaya Alp
Süleymanşâh
Ertuğrul
Saru-Yatı (Savcı)	Osman Gazi	Gündüz Alp
Bay-Hoca	Ay-Doğdu

Family tree in Neşrî's Kitâb-ı Cihannümâ

Süleymanşâh
Sunkur-Tekin	Ertuğrul	Gündoğdu	Tündar (Dündar)
Saru-Yatı	Osman Gazi	Gündüz

In chapter fourteenth of The History of Âşıkpaşazâde of Âşıkpaşazâde, Osman I asserted that he had descended from Gökalp and Suleiman ibn Qutulmish the founder of Anatolian Seljuk Sultanate instead of "Süleymanşâh ibn Kaya Alp". Erhan Afyoncu claims that the identity of Süleyman Şah in the Tomb of Suleyman Shah is unidentified. He also defends that the father of Ertuğrul according to the recent investigations is Gündüz Alp.

== Operation Shah Euphrates ==
In early 2015, during the Syrian Civil War, on the night of 21–22 February 2015, a Turkish military convoy including tanks and other armored vehicles numbering about 100 entered Syria to evacuate the tomb's 40 guards and to relocate the tomb of Suleyman Shah.

The tomb is now temporarily located in Turkey-controlled territory 200 meters inside Syria, 22 km (14 mi) west of Ayn al-Arab and 5 km (3.1 mi) east of the Euphrates, less than 2 km (1.2 mi) southeast of the Turkish village of Esmesi that is in southernmost Birecik District.

The Turkish government has highlighted that the relocation is temporary, and that it does not constitute any change to the status of the tomb site.

== In fiction ==
Serdar Gökhan appeared as Süleyman Şah in the Turkish TV series Diriliş: Ertuğrul, where he starred as a main character in the first season, and its sequel, Kuruluş: Osman, where he made a cameo appearance in the thirteenth episode.
