= Ertuğrul =

Father of Osman I, died c. 1280

- Bey; Ghazi
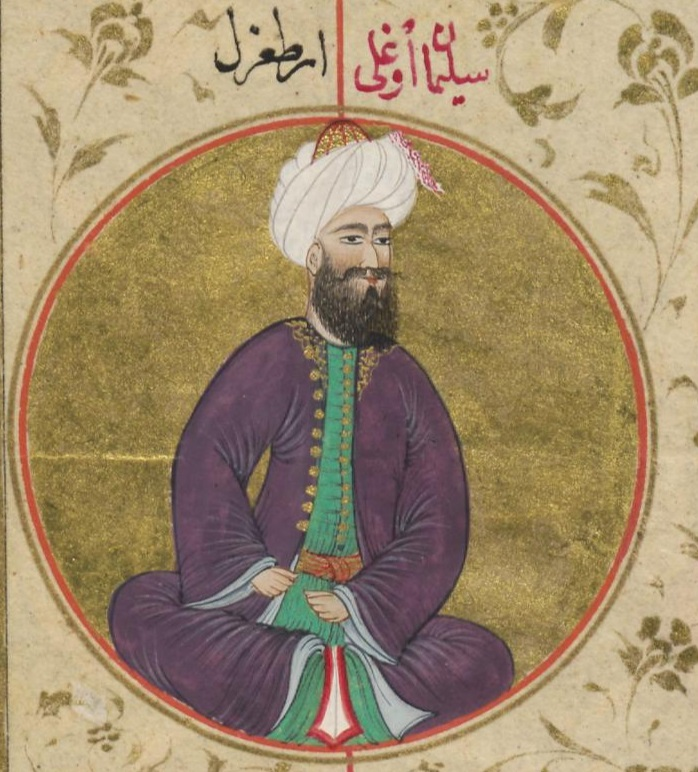
- Ertuğrul depicted in 17th-century Ottoman miniature book Sübhatü’l-ahbâr

Uch Bey of the Sultanate of Rum
- Predecessor: Office established
- Successor: Osman I
- Born: Unknown
- Died: c. 1280 (Note: 15th century Ottoman historian Neşri mentions that Ertugrul died at the age of 93.); Söğüt, Sultanate of Rum
- Burial: Tomb of Ertuğrul Gazi, Söğüt, Bilecik Province
- Spouse: Halime Hatun (disputed)
- Issue: Osman I; Saru Batu Savcı Bey; Gündüz Alp II
- Father: Suleyman Shah or Gündüz Alp
- Mother: Hayme Ana
- Religion: Islam

Ertuğrul or Ertuğrul Ghazi (Ottoman Turkish: ارطغرل, romanized: Erṭoġrıl; died c. 1280/1281) was a 13th-century uch bey (marcher-lord), who was the father of Osman I. Little is known about Ertuğrul's life. According to Ottoman tradition, he was the son of Suleyman Shah, the leader of the Kayı tribe (a claim which has come under criticism from many historians) (Note: These historians argue either that the Kayı genealogy was fabricated in the fifteenth century, or that there is otherwise insufficient evidence to believe in it.) of the Oghuz Turks (then known as Turkomans), which fled from western Central Asia to Anatolia to escape the Mongol conquests; but according to contemporary numinastic evidence, he was the son of Gündüz Alp. According to the legend, after the death of his father, Ertuğrul and his followers entered the service of the Sultanate of Rum, for which he was rewarded with dominion over the town of Söğüt on the frontier with the Byzantine Empire. This set off the chain of events that would ultimately lead to the founding of the Ottoman Empire.

== Biography ==
Nothing is known for certain about Ertuğrul's life, except that he was the father of Osman. As a result, historians are compelled to rely on stories written about him by the Ottomans more than a century later, which are of questionable accuracy.

According to the sources written c. 100–150 years after the establishment of the Ottoman state, Ertuğrul's lineage is traced to Noah, through Oghuz Khagan. Ottoman historian and ambassador to the Qara Qoyunlu, Şükrullah states that Ertuğrul's lineage goes to Gökalp, a son of Oghuz Khagan. The author states that the information was shown during a court of Jahan Shah, from a book written in Mongolian script. Since historians like Şükrullah did not have any information about the lineage of the Oghuzes, they attributed Kayı Khan to Gök Alp [sic] (it should be "Khan" instead of "Alp") and not to Gün Khan. However, it is also possible that the Ottoman dynasty was a member of the Kayı tribe.

An undated coin, from the time of Osman, with the text "Minted by Osman son of Ertuğrul", suggests that Ertuğrul was a historical figure. Another coin reads "Osman bin Ertuğrul bin Gündüz Alp", though Ertuğrul is traditionally considered the son of Suleyman Shah.

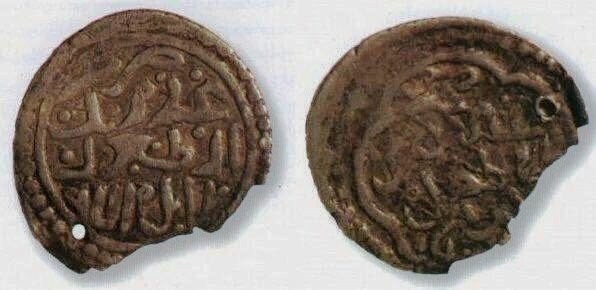
Minted coin, contemporary with Osman I, indicating the existence of Ertuğrul. The coin reads as follows: Struck by Osman, son of Ertuğrul. May his kingdom perpetuate

In Enveri's Düsturname (1465) and Karamani Mehmet Pasha's chronicle (before 1481), Gündüz Alp is Ertugrul's father. After Aşıkpaşazade's chronicle Tevārīḫ-i Āl-i ʿOsmān (15th century), the Suleyman Shah version became the official one.

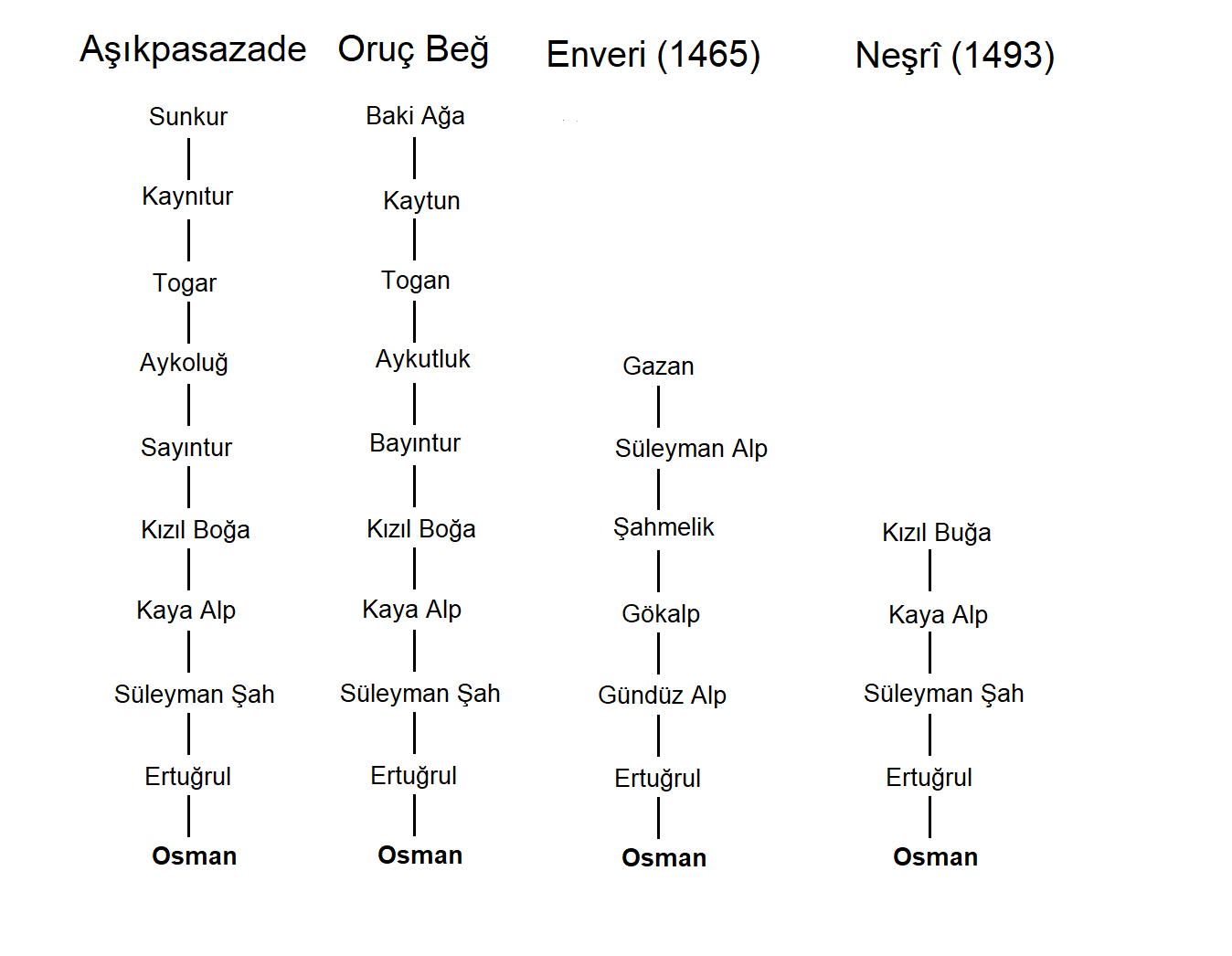
Father of Ertuğrul in Osman I's genealogy according to different Ottoman historians

According to many Turkish sources, Ertuğrul had three brothers named; Sungur-tekin, Gündoğdu and Dündar. After the death of their father, Ertuğrul with his mother Hayme Hatun, Dündar and his followers from the Kayı tribe migrated west into Anatolia and entered the Seljuk Sultanate of Rum, leaving his two brothers who took their clans towards the east. In this way, the Kayı tribe was divided into two parts. According to these later traditions, Ertuğrul was chief of his Kayı tribe.

As a result of his assistance to the Seljuks against the Byzantines, Ertuğrul was granted lands in Karaca Dağ, a mountainous area between Diyarbakır and Urfa, by Kayqubad I, the Seljuk Sultan of Rum. One account indicates that the Seljuk leader's rationale for granting Ertuğrul land was for Ertuğrul to repel any hostile incursion from the Byzantines or other adversary. Later, he received the village of Söğüt which he conquered together with the surrounding lands. That village, where he later died, became the Ottoman capital under his son, Osman I. Some sources claim that he successfully besieged Karacahisar, however, it is still a matter of dispute among historians. Osman's mother has been referred to as Halime Hatun in later myths, and there is a grave outside the Ertuğrul Gâzi Tomb which bears the name, but it is disputed.

According to many sources, he had two other sons in addition to Osman I: Saru-Batu (Savci) Bey and Gündüz Bey. Like his son, Osman, and their descendants, Ertuğrul is often referred to as a Ghazi, a heroic champion fighter for the cause of Islam.

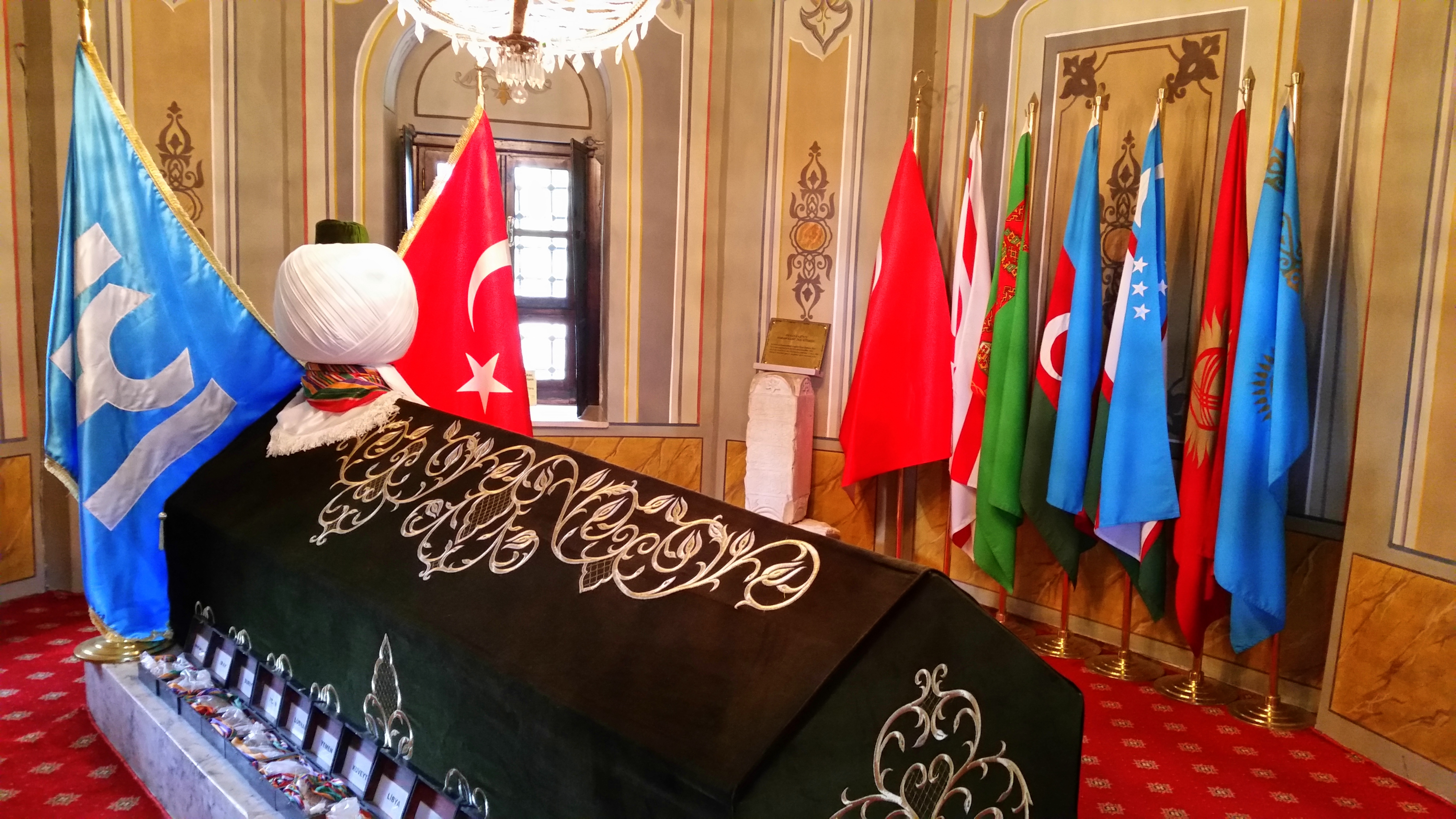
Grave of Ertuğrul, Söğüt

== Legacy ==
A tomb and mosque dedicated to Ertuğrul is said to have been built by Osman I at Söğüt, but due to several rebuildings nothing certain can be said about the origin of these structures. The current mausoleum was built by Sultan Abdul Hamid II (r. 1876–1909) in the late 19th century. The town of Söğüt celebrates an annual festival to the memory of the early Ottomans.

In 1826, Ertuğrul Cavalry Regiment of the Ottoman Army was named in his honor. The Ottoman frigate Ertuğrul, launched in 1863, was named after him. Abdul Hamid II also had a yacht with the same name. The Ertuğrul Tekke Mosque (late 19th century) in Istanbul, Turkey and the Ertuğrul Gazi Mosque in Ashgabat, Turkmenistan (completed in 1998), are also named in his honor. The mosque in Turkmenistan was established by the Turkish government as a symbol of the link between Turkey and Turkmenistan.

Ertuğrul is one of several statues that surround the Independence Monument in Ashgabat, Turkmenistan. The statues depict people praised in the Ruhnama, a spiritual guide written by Turkmenistan president Saparmurat Niyazov. The Ertuğrul statue has also been depicted on a 2001 commemorative coin.

Two statues of Ertuğrul on horseback were placed by a private cooperative housing society in Lahore, Pakistan, in 2020. They were inspired by Diriliş: Ertuğrul, a 2014 TV series. A bust of Ertuğrul was erected in Ordu, Turkey, in 2020. However the bust was removed by local authorities after it was pointed out that it resembled the actor from the TV series.

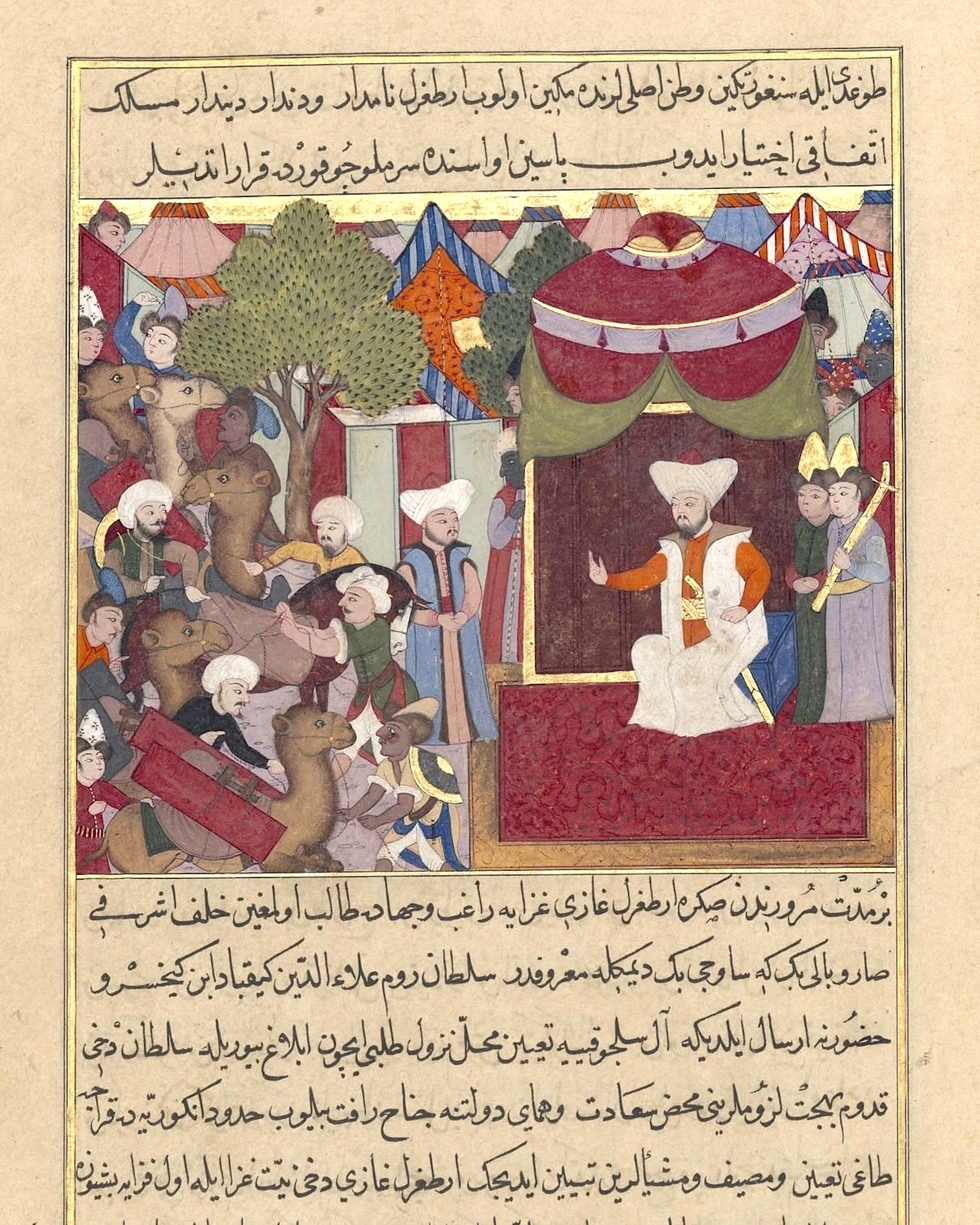
1616 depiction of Ertuğrul at court, from Tadj al-Tawarikh

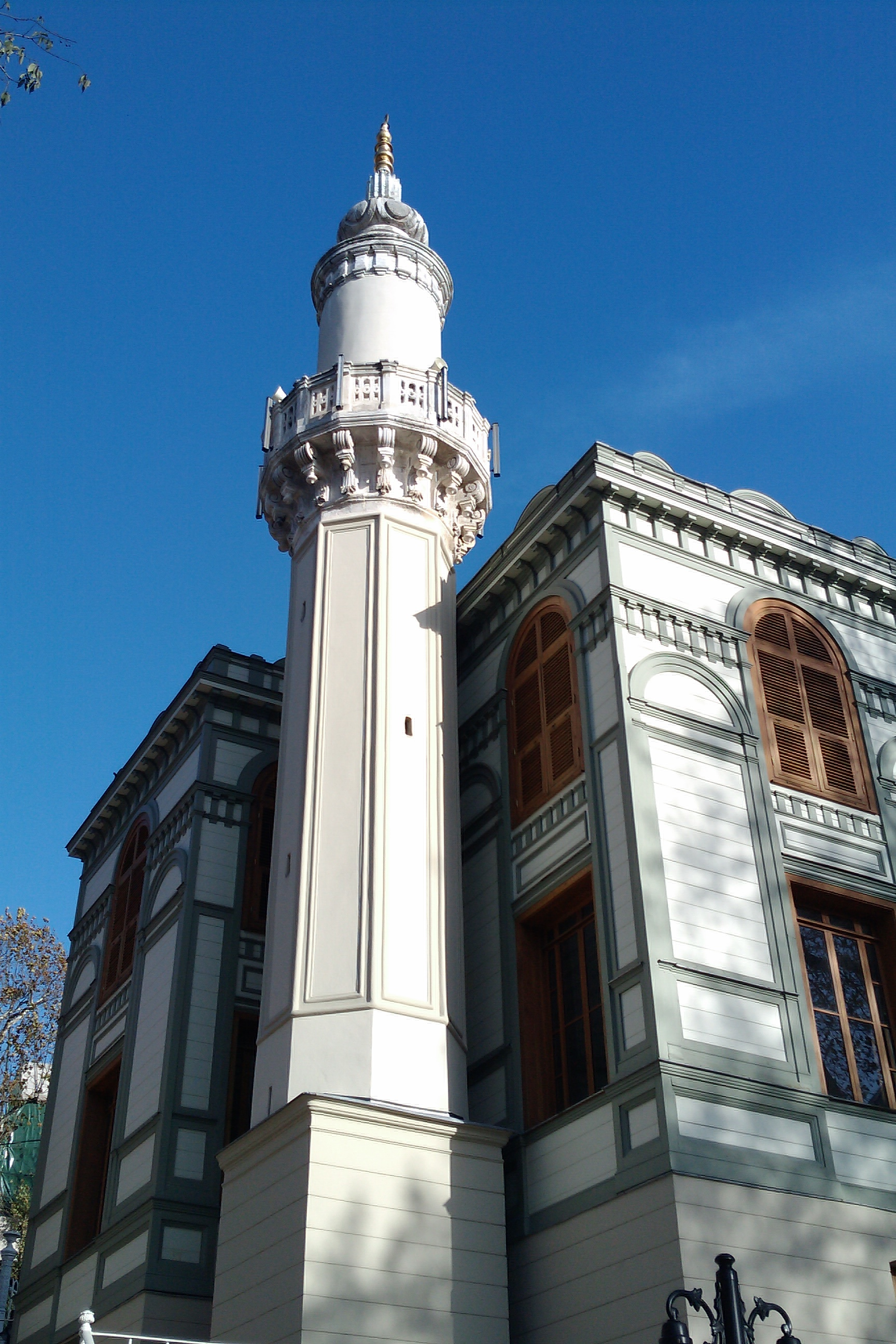
Ertuğrul Tekke Mosque, in Istanbul, Turkey

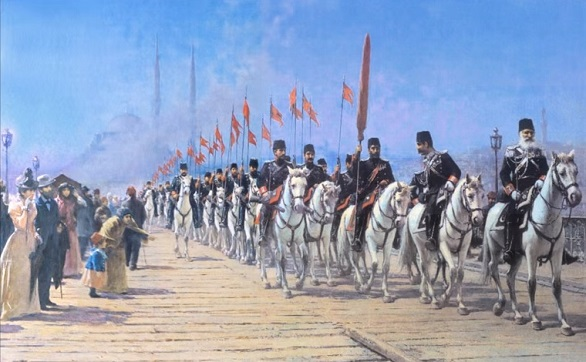
The Ertuğrul cavalry regiment, 1901 painting by Fausto Zonaro

Ertuğrul Gazi Mosque, Ashgabat, Turkmenistan

Independence Monument in Ashgabat, Turkmenistan. Ertuğrul statue on the right

=== In fiction ===
Ertugrul has been portrayed in the Turkish television series Kuruluş/Osmancık (1988), adapted from a novel by the same name, Diriliş: Ertuğrul (2014–2019) and the sequel Kuruluş: Osman (2019).

== See also ==
- Ottoman family tree
- Söğüt Ertuğrul Gazi Museum
- Karacahisar Castle
- Ertuğrul Osman, "the Last Ottoman"

== Bibliography ==
- Ágoston, Gábor; Bruce Masters, eds. (2009). Encyclopedia of the Ottoman Empire. New York: Facts on File. ISBN 978-0-8160-6259-1.
- Lindner, Rudi P. (1983). Nomads and Ottomans in Medieval Anatolia. Bloomington: Indiana University Press. ISBN 0-933070-12-8.
- Kafadar, Cemal (1995). Between Two Worlds: The Construction of the Ottoman State. Berkeley: University of California Press. ISBN 978-0-520-20600-7.
