= Osman I =

Founder of the Ottoman Empire

- Ghazi; Bey; Uch Bey
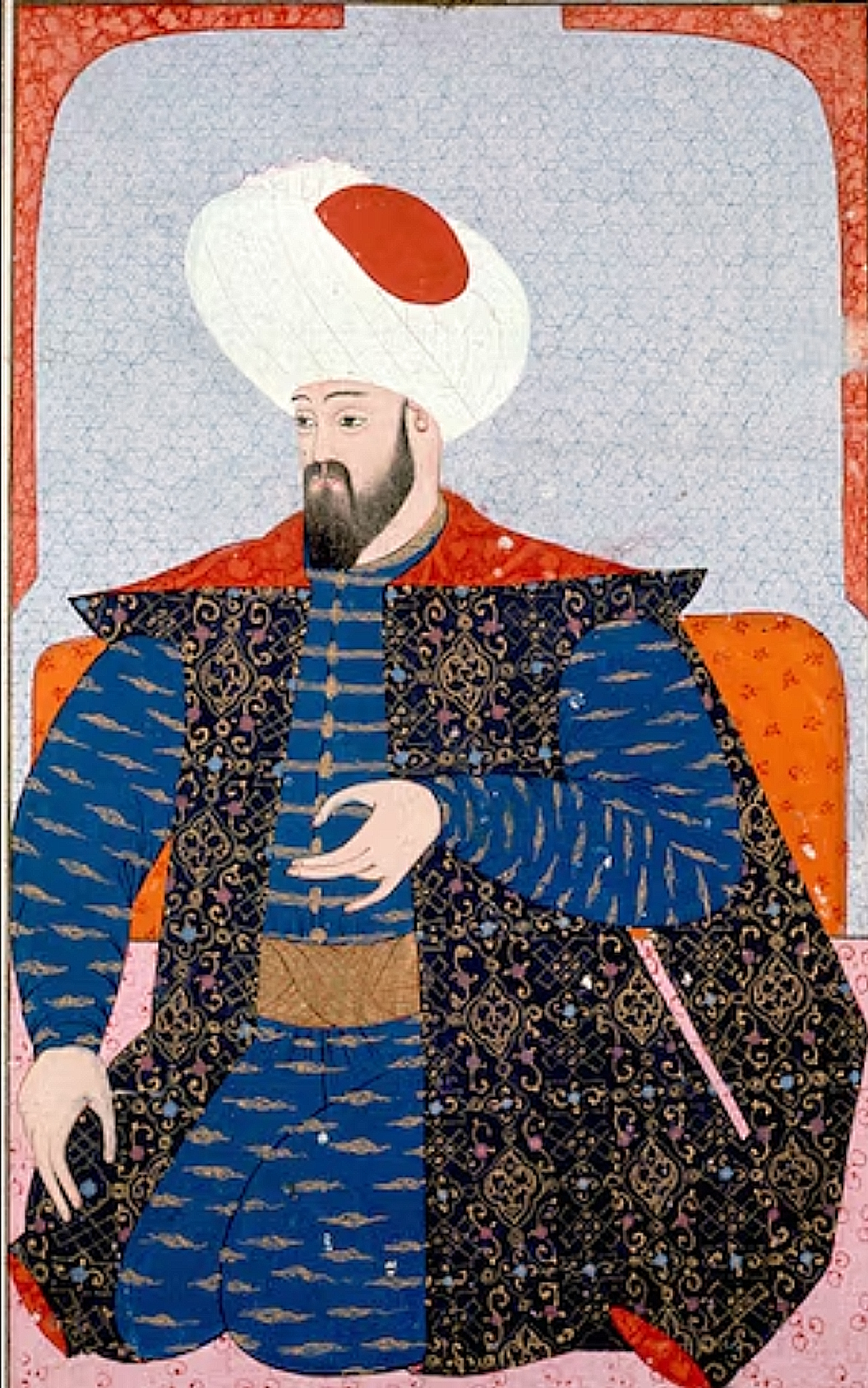
- An Ottoman miniature depicting Osman I, c. 1580

Bey of the Ottoman Beylik
- Reign: c. 1299 – 1323/4
- Successor: Orhan

Uch Bey of the Sultanate of Rum
- Reign: c. 1280 – c. 1299
- Predecessor: Ertuğrul
- Born: Unknown, possibly c. 1254/5
- Died: 1323/4 (age 68–70); Bursa, Ottoman Beylik
- Burial: Tomb of Osman Gazi, Osmangazi, Bursa Province, Turkey
- Spouse: Rabia Bala Hatun; Malhun Hatun
- Issue Among others: Orhan Ghazi; Alaeddin Ali Pasha
Names
- عثمان بن ارطغرل; Osman bin Ertuğrul
- Dynasty: Ottoman dynasty
- Father: Ertuğrul
- Mother: Unknown
- Religion: Sunni Islam

Osman I or Osman Ghazi (Ottoman Turkish: عثمان غازى, romanized: ʿOsmān Ġāzī; Turkish: I. Osman or Osman Gazi; died 1323/4) (Note: Sometimes transliterated archaically as Othman and historically spelt Ottoman, Otoman or Othoman in English.) was the eponymous founder of the Ottoman Empire (first known as a beylik or emirate). While initially a small Turkoman principality during Osman's lifetime, his beylik transformed into a vast empire in the centuries after his death. It existed until 1922, shortly after the end of World War I, when the sultanate was abolished.

Owing to the scarcity of historical sources dating from his lifetime, very little factual information about Osman has survived. Not a single written source survives from Osman's reign, and the Ottomans did not record the history of his life until the fifteenth century, more than a hundred years after his death. Because of this, historians find it very challenging to differentiate between fact and myth in the many stories told about him. One historian has even gone so far as to declare it impossible, describing the period of Osman's life as a "black hole".

According to later Ottoman tradition, Osman's ancestors were descendants of the Kayı tribe of Oghuz Turks. However, many scholars of the early Ottomans regard it as a later fabrication meant to reinforce dynastic legitimacy.

The Ottoman principality was one of many Anatolian beyliks that emerged in the second half of the thirteenth century. Situated in the region of Bithynia in the north of Asia Minor, Osman's principality found itself particularly well placed to launch attacks on the vulnerable Byzantine Empire, which his descendants would eventually go on to conquer.

== Name ==
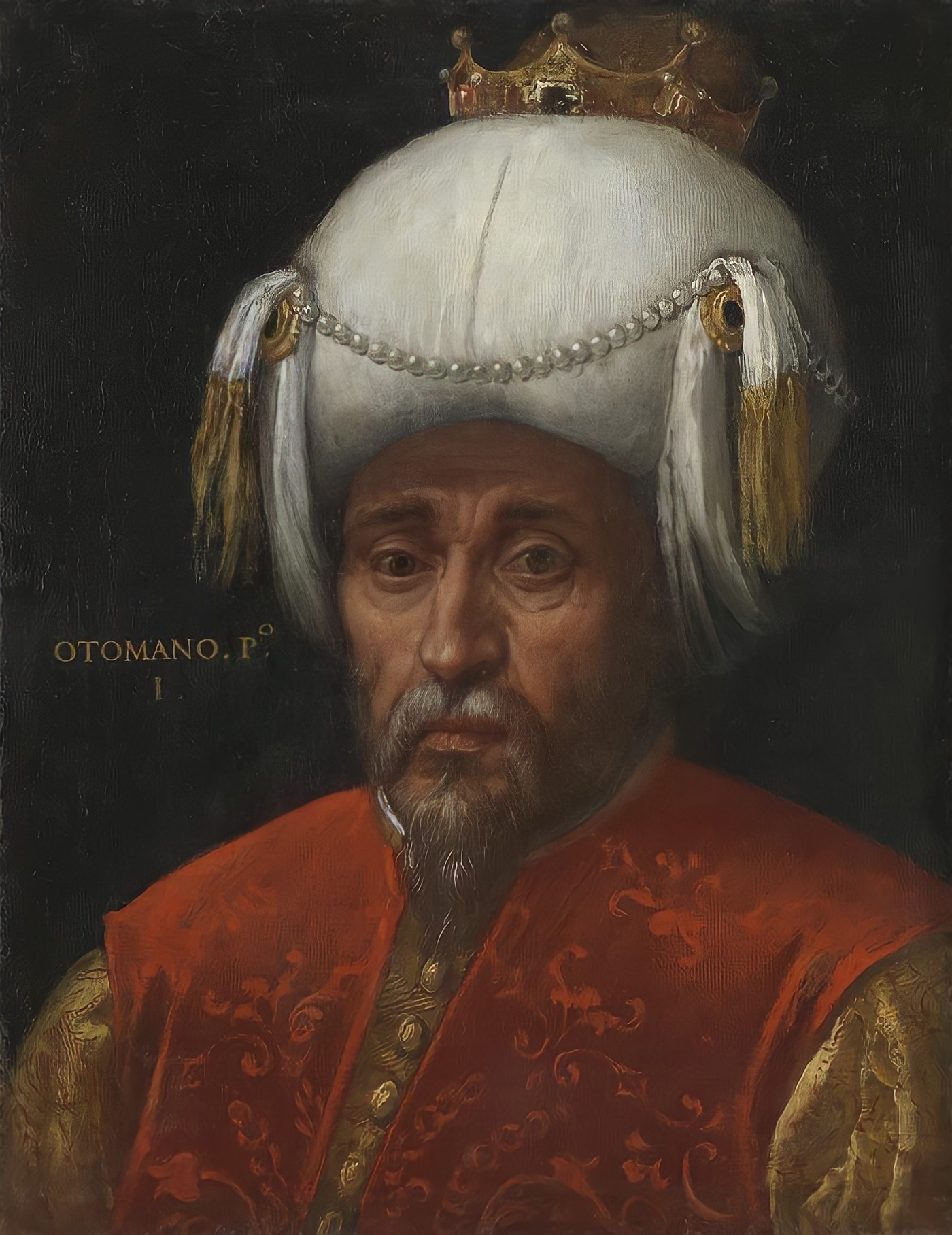
16th-century depiction of Otomano P[rim]o (Osman I) by Paolo Veronese

Some scholars have argued that Osman's original name was Turkish, probably Atman or Ataman, and was only later changed to ʿOsmān, of Arabic origin. The earliest Byzantine sources, including Osman's contemporary and Greek historian George Pachymeres, spell his name as Ἀτουμάν (Atouman) or Ἀτμάν (Atman), whereas Greek sources regularly render both the Arabic form ʿUthmān and the Turkish version ʿOsmān with θ, τθ, or τσ. An early Arabic source mentioning him also used "ط" (ṭ) rather than "ث" (th) in one instance. Osman thus could have adopted the more prestigious Muslim name later in his life. Turkish historian Halil İnalcık argued that the hypotheses that Osman was in fact named Ataman (per George Pachymeres), and that he came from the Dasht-i Qipchaq north of the Black Sea, are both remote possibilities.

Arab scholars like Shihab al-Umari and Ibn Khaldun used the name Othman, while Ibn Battuta, who visited the region during Orhan's reign, called him Osmancık (also spelled Othmānjiq or Osmanjiq). The suffix -cık (or -cuk), indicates the diminutive in Turkish, thus he was known by the name of Osmancik, which means "Osman the Little", to differentiate between him and the third Rashidun Caliph "Uthman the Great".

From the 16th century until well into the 18th century, his name was written as "Ottoman", "Otoman" or "Othoman" in English (Early Modern English). The adjective "Ottoman" comes from this name.

== Historical background ==
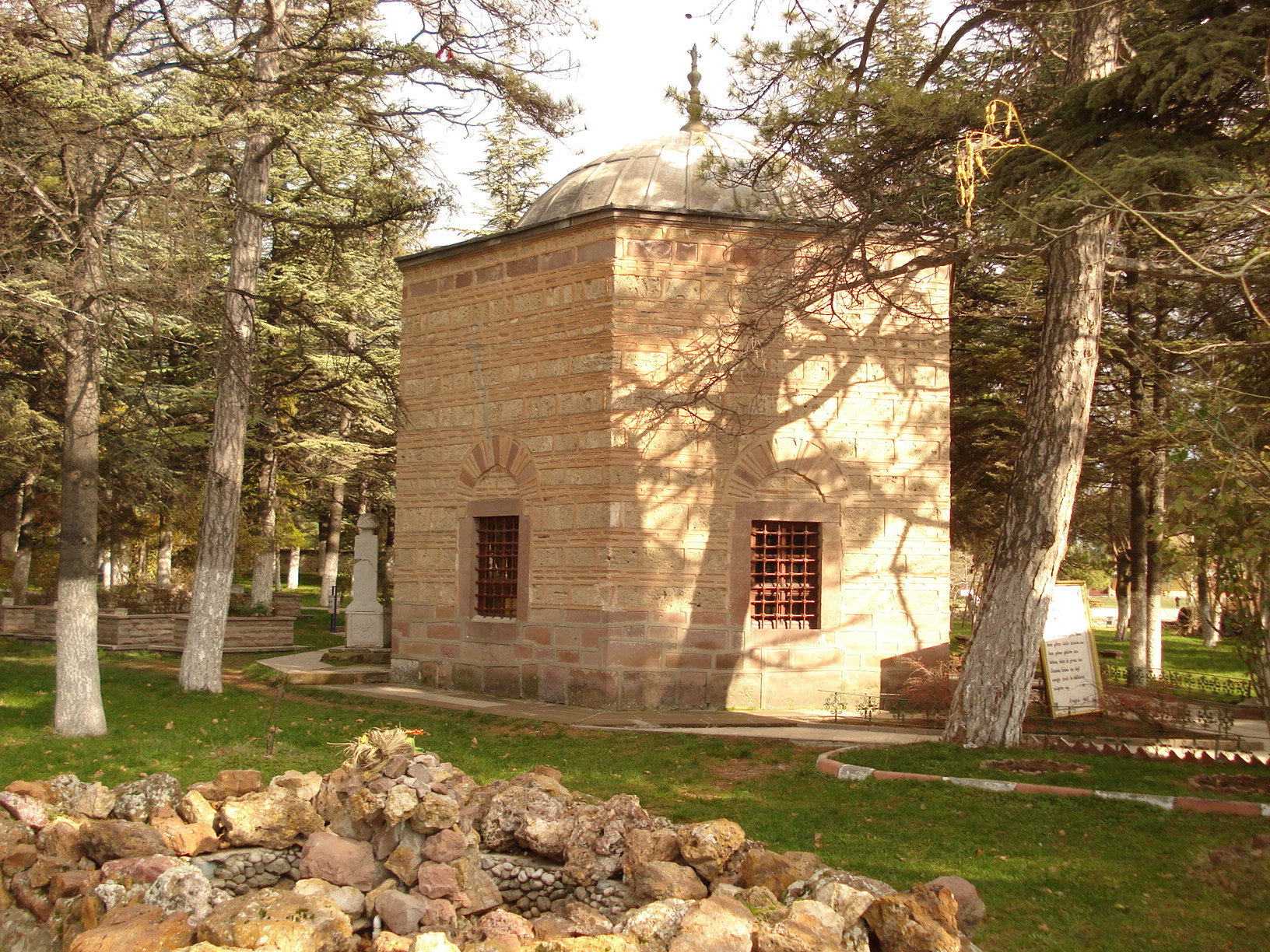
Ertuğrul's türbe (tomb) in Söğüt

Most sources agree that the Ottoman Turks belonged to the Kayı Oghuz Turkic clan, who, according to Ottoman traditions, fled their native homeland in Central Asia during the early 13th century due to the Mongol invasions. The clan settled in Anatolia, in a region belonging to the Seljuk Sultanate of Rûm. Other sources claim that the Kayı clan moved to Anatolia two centuries earlier than the previously mentioned date, alongside the Seljuks, when they left Transoxiana to Khurasan around 1040 to reside near the city of Merv. Then, the Kayı clan moved towards eastern Anatolia after 1071, where it displaced other Turkic clans. Later, it became involved in the army of Sultan Kayqubad I and fought against the Khwarazmians, Mongols, and Byzantines, who were raiding Seljuk lands. According to several sources, the Kayı warriors were known for filling first lines in battles, and their fighting skills and bravery were among the major factors which contributed to Seljuk victories in many battles. This fact prompted Sultan Kayqubad to appoint Ertuğrul, the clan's Emir, as a Moqaddam (Lieutenant), and to reward the Kayıs some fertile lands near Ankara, where they settled and remained in the service of the Sultan for several years.

Later, Ertuğrul was granted dominion over the town of Söğüt in northwestern Anatolia on the Byzantine frontier. He also obtained the title of Uç beyliği or Uç bey (literally: marcher-lord). Granting this title was in line with the traditions of the Seljuk Sultanate, which was rewarding any clan chieftain who rose to power and was joined by a number of smaller clans, the title of marcher-lord. However, Ertuğrul had far-reaching political ambitions. He sought to expand beyond the lands rewarded to him. Thus, he started raiding the Byzantine possessions in the name of the Sultan successfully conquering several towns and villages, and slowly expanding his dominion over the course of his half a century long tenure as a Seljuk governor. In 1281, Ertuğrul died at nearly 90 years of age.

== Birth, lineage, and early years ==
=== Sources about Osman's early life ===
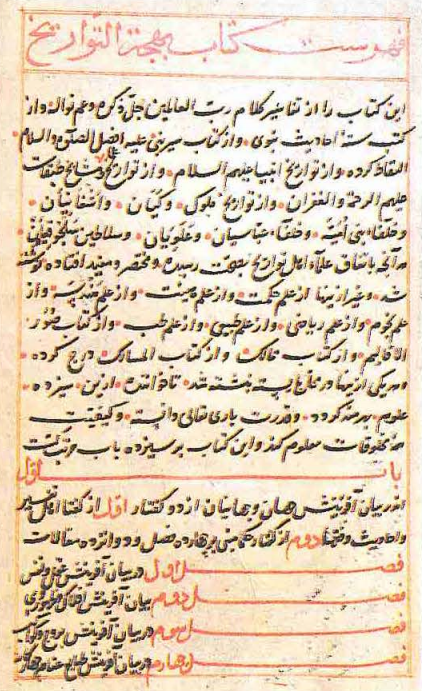
Index of Behcetü't-Tevârîh, one of the Ottoman sources that talks about Osman's origins

The exact date of Osman's birth is unknown, and very little is known about his early life and origins due to the scarcity of sources and the many myths and legends which came to be told about him by the Ottomans in later centuries. The reason for the lack of information available about this stage of Osman's life is due to the fact that the oldest-known source about this time period was written about a hundred years after Osman's death. Among these sources are: Destan-ı Tevarih-i Al-i Osman (The Oral history of the Ottomans), written in the 14th century by the Ottoman poet and court physician Tâceddîn İbrâhîm bin Hızîr better known as Ahmedî (1334–1413), Behcetü't-Tevârîh (The Joy of histories) by Şükrullah (d. 1464), and Tevarih-i Âl-i Osman (History of the Ottomans) by Derviş Ahmed Âşıkî, known as Âşıkpaşazâde (1400–1484). Additionally, these remaining sources are not the originals, but rather copies, or copies of the copies that were rewritten over the years, leading to a probable loss or altering in the information. In fact, it is accepted that Ottoman, European, and Byzantine sources are not very reliable when considering the origins of Osman and his clan. On one hand, the oldest known records originally written by the Ottomans all date back to the period that followed the conquest of Constantinople (1453 CE). On the other hand, none of the Byzantine historians did refer in their writings to the origin of the Ottomans. As for European historians, these Turkic Muslim peoples were outside of their interest. However, that changed after a century of this period, when the Ottomans began to pose a threat to Europe.

=== Birth ===
Some sources indicate that Osman was born on 13 February 1258, the exact same day the Mongol hordes invaded Baghdad, killing its inhabitants and ravaging its landmarks. He was most likely born around the middle of the thirteenth century, possibly in 1254/5, the date given by the sixteenth-century Ottoman historian Kemalpaşazade. The few available sources agree that he was born in the town of Söğüt, which his father Ertuğrul took as the capital of his beylik.

=== Lineage ===
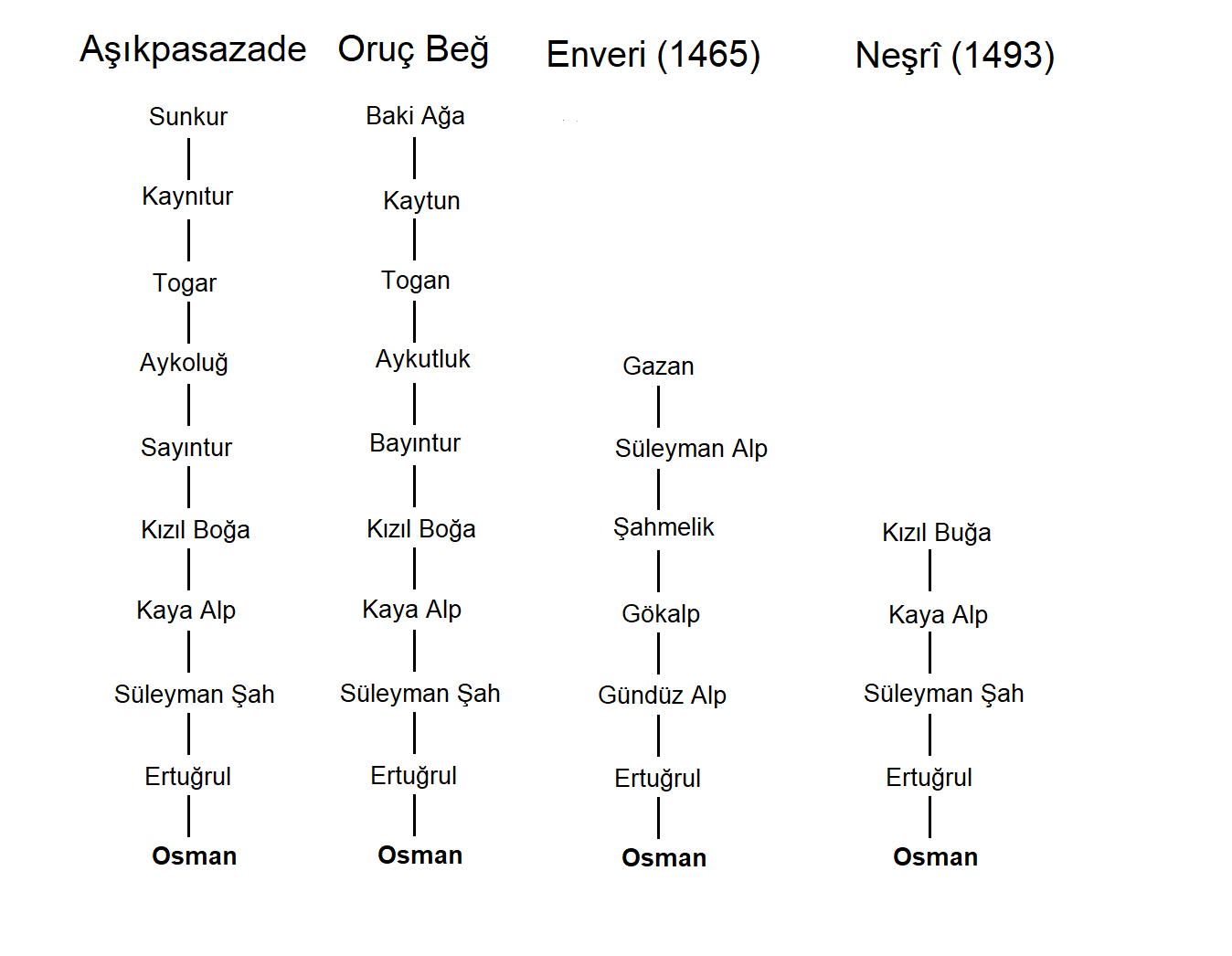
Osman's genealogy according to different Ottoman historians

According to Ottoman tradition, Osman's father Ertuğrul led the Turkic Kayı tribe west from Central Asia into Anatolia, fleeing the Mongol onslaught. He then pledged allegiance to the Sultan of the Anatolian Seljuks, who granted him dominion over the town of Söğüt on the Byzantine frontier. This connection between Ertuğrul and the Seljuks, however, was largely invented by court chroniclers a century later, and the true origins of the Ottomans thus remain obscure. According to the Karamanid historian Shikari, Osman was a lowborn Yörük and shepherd.

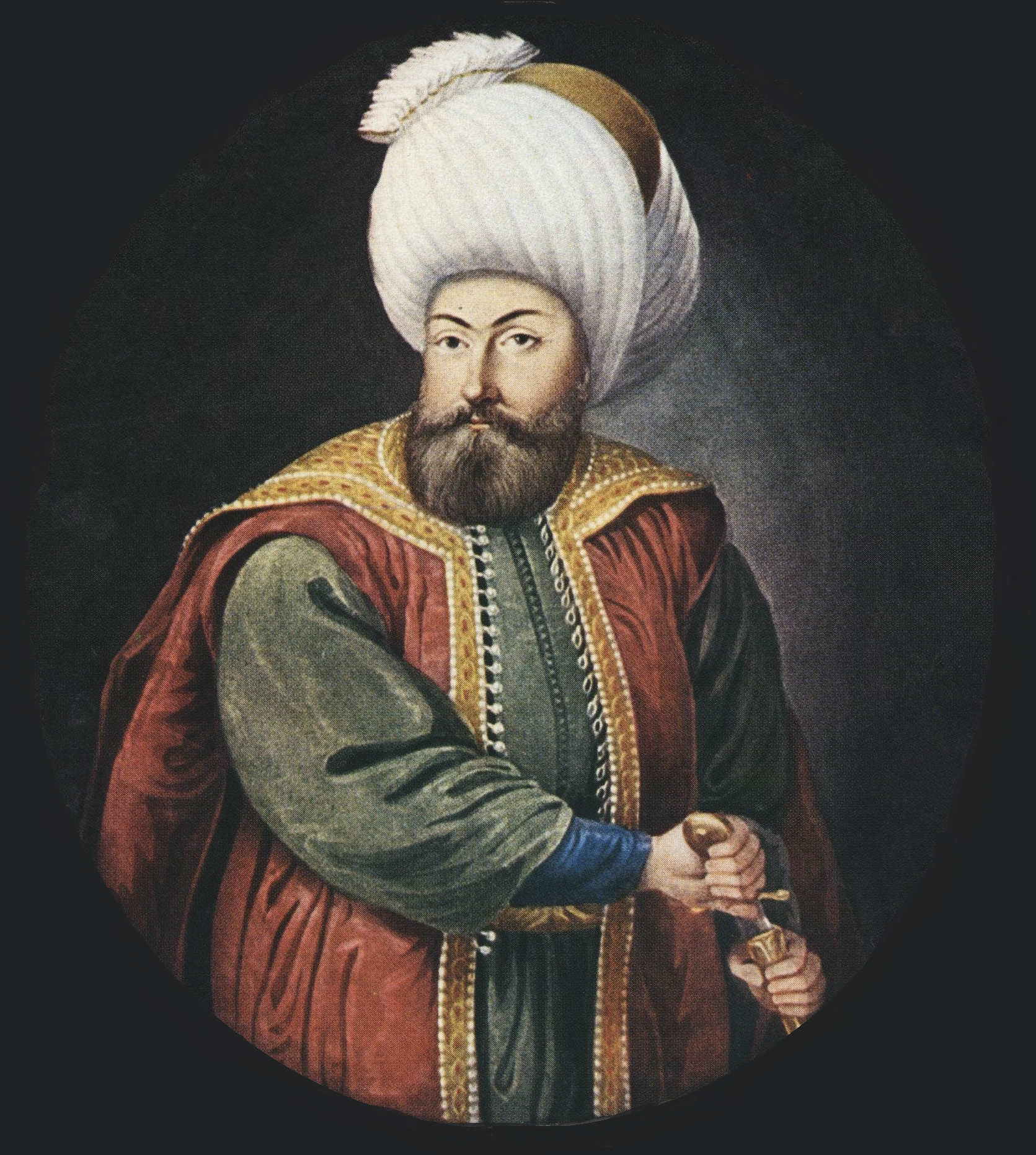
19th-century depiction of Osman, by Konstantin Kapıdağlı

In terms of proportions, the most popular and classic narration is that Osman is the grandson of Süleyman Şah, who died drowning while crossing the Euphrates River on horseback. The Turkish historian Yılmaz Öztuna considers that Osman's grandfather, and Ertuğrul's father, is called Gündüz Alp, saying that it is more likely that Süleyman Şah is a name stuck in Anatolian popular memory, and it actually refers to Süleyman bin Qutulmish who founded the Seljuk Sultanate of Rûm. Öztuna adds that it is possible that Ottoman historians tried forming a connection between the Ottomans and the Seljuks, especially since the Ottomans appeared on the stage of history claiming to be the legitimate successors of the Seljuks. Based on this, Osman's assumed lineage is as follows: Osman bin Ertuğrul bin Gündüz Alp bin Kaya Alp bin Gökalp bin Sarquk Alp bin Kayı Alp. Other researchers agree that the connection between Ertuğrul, Osman, and the Seljuks may have been largely invented by court chroniclers a century later, and the true origins of the Ottomans thus remain obscure. On the other hand, some Ottoman sources indicate further lineage to Osman and the Oghuz Turks, which is closer to myth than reality, saying that these people are descendants of Japheth, son of Noah, and that Osman's genealogical tree contains 52 ancestors or more and ends with the Prophet Noah himself. This lineage includes Gökalp and Oghuz Han (who is said to be the father of Gökalp), and all the Oghuz Turkic peoples, including the Seljuks.

=== Early years ===
The Ottoman historian Kemalpaşazâde mentioned that Osman was Ertuğrul's youngest son and that he was raised in the traditional nomadic Turkic ways: he learned wrestling, swordsmanship, horse riding, archery, and falconry, from an early age. He quickly mastered the previously mentioned skills, outperforming all his brothers. He was also taught the principles of Islam, and was influenced by the teachings of Sufi sheikhs, mostly his mentor Sheikh Edebali, and this was reflected in his personality and lifestyle.

== Origin of the Ottoman Empire ==
Almost nothing is known for certain about Osman's early activities, except that he controlled the region around the town of Söğüt and from there launched raids against the neighboring Byzantine Empire. The first datable event in Osman's life is the Battle of Bapheus in 1301 or 1302, in which he defeated a Byzantine force sent to counter him.

Osman appears to have followed the strategy of increasing his territories at the expense of the Byzantines while avoiding conflict with his more powerful Turkish neighbors. His first advances were through the passes which lead from the barren areas of northern Phrygia near modern Eskişehir into the more fertile plains of Bithynia; according to Stanford Shaw, these conquests were achieved against the local Byzantine nobles, "some of whom were defeated in battle, others being absorbed peacefully by purchase contracts, marriage contracts, and the like."

=== Ascendance to leadership ===
Osman became Emir, or Bey, upon his father's death around 1281. According to some historians, Osman's accession to power wasn't peaceful as he had to fight his relatives before he got hold of his clan's leadership. One of Osman's major rivals was his uncle Dündar Bey, who might have plotted to kill his nephew or rebelled against him when the latter decided to attack a small Greek island. Dündar Bey saw that Osman's ambition as a threat that might put the whole clan in danger. However, Osman had to pull out his sword to kill his uncle for disobeying.

In the Vilayetname, a book containing the narrations about Haji Bektash Veli, Osman's younger uncle, was the one who became Bey after Ertuğrul's death. During that time, Osman and several other warriors started organizing raids on Byzantine lands adjacent to Söğüt, such as Yarhisar, Bilecik, İnegöl, and İznik. As a result, the Byzantine Tekfur (governor) of Bursa was provoked, and he sent envoys to the Seljuk Sultan Alâeddin Kayqubad III, complaining about these constant assaults. Thus, the Sultan ordered Gündüz Alp to bring forth his young nephew to stand before him, and so Osman was arrested and sent to Konya. According to this narration, Sultan Kayqubad admired Osman's courage and deeds, and didn't wish to punish him, instead, Osman was sent to Ḥājī Baktāš Walī to consider his matter. Osman was warmly received by the Sufi mystic, who then ordered his release saying: "I have been waiting for someone like him for years". After that, Ḥājī Baktāš Walī wrapped Osman's head with the same Turban associated with Sufi sheikhs, and sent him back to Konya with a message to the sultan, asking that Osman to become the Kayı Emir. Thus, Osman became the clan's leader.

=== Importance of the Osmanic Beylik location ===
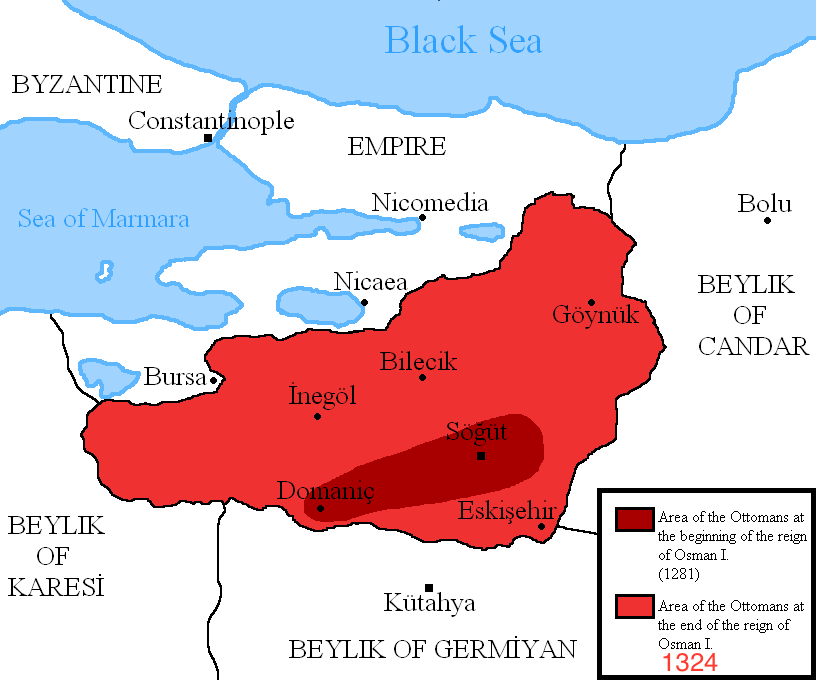
Area of the Ottoman Beylik during the reign of Osman I

From a military point of view, the location of Osman's Beylik had a significant impact on his success as a conquering warrior. His capital Söğüt was located on a hill in a well-defended position, mediating the main road from Constantinople to Konya. The importance of this site emerged due to the political fragmentation of Anatolia that gave small states greater importance than they originally had. Being an Emir to a beylik bordering Byzantine lands, Osman had the opportunity to direct all his efforts towards war and Jihad following the footsteps of the Seljuks with intentions to conquer all Byzantine territories, and absorb them into the Islamic Caliphate. Encouraged by the weakness of the ancient Empire and its ongoing wars in Europe, Osman had the chance to expand towards western Anatolia crossing the Dardanelles to southeastern Europe. Commenting on these actions, some historians argue that Osman's strategy of increasing his territories at the expense of the Byzantines was due to his intention to avoid conflicts with his more powerful Turkic neighbours.

Politically, Osman showed great skills forming and applying new administrative systems in his beylik. During his reign, the Ottomans made great strides towards transitioning from the Nomadic tribe system to settling down in permanent settlements. This helped them consolidate their position and rapidly develop into a major power. Moreover, the beylik's location in northwestern Anatolia, next to Christendom, imposed a military policy on the Ottomans, which gave them better chances to grow and expand compared to the beyliks of the interior. Osman's beylik was also relatively far from both the Mongol invasions and the influence of the powerful Turkoman beyliks in southern and southwestern Anatolia. Add to that, its proximity to the Silk Road linking Byzantine lands in the west to areas controlled by the Mongols in the east, gave it prominent strategic and economic characteristics. Also, the Osmanic beylik was the only Islamic base facing the yet unconquered Byzantine regions, which made it a magnet to many Turkomen farmers, warriors, and Dervishes fleeing the Mongols, and aspiring to conquer new lands for economic and religious reasons.

=== Osman's Dream ===
Osman I had a close relationship with a local religious leader of dervishes named Sheikh Edebali, whose daughter he married. A story emerged among later Ottoman writers to explain the relationship between the two men, in which Osman had a dream while staying in the Sheikh's house. The story appears in the late-fifteenth-century chronicle of Aşıkpaşazade as follows:

He saw that a moon arose from the holy man's breast and came to sink in his own breast. A tree then sprouted from his navel and its shade compassed the world. Beneath this shade there were mountains, and streams flowed forth from the foot of each mountain. Some people drank from these running waters, others watered gardens, while yet others caused fountains to flow. When Osman awoke he told the story to the holy man, who said 'Osman, my son, congratulations, for God has given the imperial office to you and your descendants and my daughter Malhun shall be your wife.

The dream became an important foundational myth for the empire, imbuing the House of Osman with God-given authority over the earth and providing its fifteenth-century audience with an explanation for Ottoman success. The dream story may also have served as a form of compact: just as God promised to provide Osman and his descendants with sovereignty, it was also implicit that it was the duty of Osman to provide his subjects with prosperity.

=== Political relations at the beginning of Osman's reign ===
A map of independent Turkic beyliks in Anatolia during the 14th century, showing the neighbouring Ottoman and Germiyanid beyliks

According to the Bektashi narration, whose accuracy cannot be confirmed since it was only mentioned in Bektashi sources, plus the fact that it did not enjoy much support from the majority of researchers, Ḥājī Baktāš Walī was one of the Wafā'īyyah tariqah dervishes, a Murid of Bābā Eliyās al-Khorāsānī. Once Bābā Eliyās died, both Ḥājī Baktāš Walī and Sheikh Edebali became among his 60 successors, and grandmasters of the Ahyan Rûm brotherhood of warriors and farmers, who enjoyed great influence among the people. When Osman married Sheikh Edebali's daughter, he secured his control over the brotherhood, and soon became their new grandmaster. As a result of this marriage, all the Ahyan sheikhs became under Ottoman control. This has a major impact on the establishment and development of the Osmanic beylik after Osman's death during the reign of his son Orhan. Some argue that Osman's marriage to sheikh Edebali's daughter was his first brilliant political undertake. On the other hand, Turkish historian Professor Cemal Kafadar considers that the intermarriage between the Osmanic and Edebali's houses, explains the hostilities that later rose between the Ottomans and the Germiyanids, since the Germiyanid Turkoman house was rewarded lands and titles by the Seljuks because of their services in subjugating the Bābā'ī revolt in 1240, and because Sheikh Edebali was considered by his followers a leader and successor to Bābā Ishāq, they all became the focus of attention of the Germiyanids.

Kafadar adds that early in Osman's reign, the young Bey showed political ingenuity forming relations with his neighbours. Osman's alliances transcended tribal, ethnic, and religious lines, and he may have followed his instinct and the requirements of his political aspirations, not mistaking the future results of the family connections he created and secured for his son after him. Osman reconstituted the political culture of the Seljuk Sultanate of Rûm in line with the needs of his beylik. He was more creative than his Turkomen neighbours in combining Turkic, Islamic, and Byzantine traditions.

Additionally, the Emir also cooperated with the Byzantine Tekfurs of the neighbouring cities and villages. He forged an agreement, so his clan, whenever they move between grazing areas in the summer, leave their belongings in the Byzantine fortress of Bilecik, and upon their return, they give its governor a token of appreciation, in the form of cheese and butter made from sheep milk and preserved in animal skins, or a good carpet made from wool. This agreement reflects the coexistence between herders, farmers and urban dwellers, during Osman's reign. Osman's friendship with Köse Mihal, governor of Chirmenkia (modern Harmanköy), was the culmination of this coexistence between Muslims and Byzantines. As for his relations with other peoples, such as the Mongols, most of whom moved to the borders of western Anatolia, and the Germiyanid Turkomen, it was hostile. That is because the Turks, in general, despised the Mongols, and the Germiyanids were probably of non-Oghuz origin. Osman allied with the Ahyan Rûm brotherhood, they formed organized groups, members in each of which worked in a single trade. The brotherhood took the responsibility to preserve justice, prevent injustice, stop oppression, follow the sharia, dictate good morals, and carry out military duties if the need arises, to defend their rights and the rights of Muslims.

The Bey also allied with newly arrived Turkomen clans to Anatolia. In general, the nomads have always had a strong militarized spirit compared to people installed in the cities. Thus, the clans were more active and effective than their city-dwelling kin. Soon enough, they become the beating heart of the Seljuk border provinces in total, and the Osmanic beylik in particular. Osman also enticed many Turkomen from the region of Paphlagonia to join his forces. These Turkomen were fine warriors, eager for jihad and conquest, each of them followed a Tariqah (an order of Sufism) and was supervised by a sheikh who taught them the meaning of jihad alongside many Islamic principles. However, another section of these Turkomen did not have close ties to Islam for various reasons, thus Osman entrusted them to several sheikhs and dervishes to be given proper Islamic education and be satiated with the values that glorify conquests aiming to spread the word of Islam. In fact, these sheikhs and dervishes were very enthusiastic about promoting the Turuq of the Khorasani Walis, and Osman's request gave them this chance.

As for the ruling hierarchy, Osman was firstly subordinate to the Chobanid Emir in Kastamonu, followed by the Seljuk Sultan through the Germiyanid Bey in Kütahya, who was in turn subordinate to the Mongol Ilkhan in Tabriz. During this period, the Seljuk Sultans had lost their power over their local Emirs, and the Mongol Ilkhan practised his authority in Anatolia through his appointed Generals, where he requested that every local governor, including Osman, sends him soldiers whenever he requests so. As for the hierarchy of name delivering in khuṭbah, Imams used to pray for the guidance of the: Abbasid caliph in Egypt first, the Mongol Ilkhan in Tabriz, Seljuk Sultan in Konya, and finally the local Bey or Emir.

== Expansion of the beylik ==
Until the end of thirteenth century, Osman I's conquests include the areas of Bilecik (Belokomis), Yenişehir (Melangeia), İnegöl (Angelokomis) and Yarhisar (Köprühisar), and Byzantine castles in these areas.

According to Shaw, Osman's first real conquests followed the collapse of Seljuk authority when he was able to occupy the fortresses of Kulucahisar and Eskişehir. Then he captured the first significant city in his territories, Yenişehir, which became the Ottoman capital.

In 1302, after soundly defeating a Byzantine force near Nicaea, Osman began settling his forces closer to Byzantine controlled areas.

Alarmed by Osman's growing influence, the Byzantines gradually fled the Anatolian countryside. Byzantine leadership attempted to contain Ottoman expansion, but their efforts were poorly organized and ineffectual. Meanwhile, Osman spent the remainder of his reign expanding his control in two directions, north along the course of the Sakarya River and southwest towards the Sea of Marmara, achieving his objectives by 1308.

Osman's last campaign was against the city of Bursa. Although Osman did not physically participate in the battle, the victory at Bursa proved to be extremely vital for the Ottomans as the city served as a staging ground against the Byzantines in Constantinople, and as a newly adorned capital for Osman's son, Orhan. Ottoman tradition holds that Osman died just after the capture of Bursa, but some scholars have argued that his death should be placed in 1324, the year of Orhan's ascention.

=== Conquest of Karacahisar ===
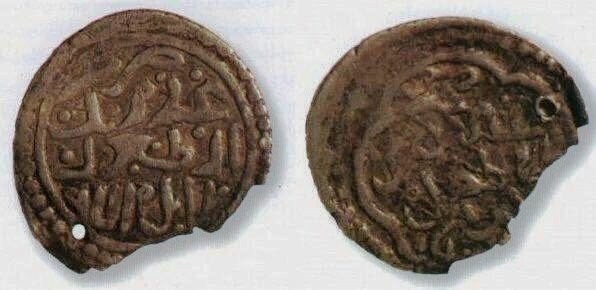
Undated akçe of Osman

After establishing his beylik, Osman had to fight on two fronts: one against the Byzantine, and the other against the Turkomen beyliks that opposed his rule, especially the Germiyanids. Osman focused on expanding at the expense of the Byzantines, and since that time, the primary Ottoman goal became the conquest of the remaining Byzantine lands. Some accounts indicate that the first battle Osman launched against the Byzantines was aimed to revenge a defeat that he suffered in the spring of 1284 or 1285, where the Byzantines, led by the Tekfur of Bursa, ambushed him and his men. It is in doubt that Osman knew about this ambush from one of his spies. Nevertheless, he chose to clash with the Byzantines and he was defeated and forced to withdraw with casualties, including his nephew Koca Saruhan bey, son of Savcı Bey. Based on this, around 1286, Osman went forward to Kulacahisar at the head of a military force of three hundred fighters, it was a fortress located two leagues away from İnegöl, within the scope of mount Uludağ. The Emir attacked the fort at night and managed to conquer it, extending his beylik northwards toward Lake İznik's proximity. The Ottoman victory at Kulacahisar triggered the fort's governor, who refused to be a subordinate subject to a Muslim ruler, especially a border Emir, so he allied himself with Karacahisar's governor, and both men agreed to fight the Muslims aiming at retaking all Byzantine lands that were lost recently. Thus, the Ottomans and the Byzantines met again in battle, somewhere between Bilecik and İnegöl, where fierce fighting took place in which Osman's brother Savcı Bey and the Byzantine commander Pilatos were killed. The Battle ended with an Ottoman victory. Then, the Ottomans entered Karacahisar where they, reportedly for the first time, converted the town's church into a mosque. Osman appointed a Qadi (magistrate) and a Subaşı (chief of police) for the newly conquered city. Historians differed in determining the date of this conquest, yet none made it prior to 1286, or exceeding 1291. Osman made his new city a staging base of his military campaigns against the Byzantines, and ordered that his name be delivered at the Friday khuṭbah, which was the first manifestation of his sovereignty and authority.

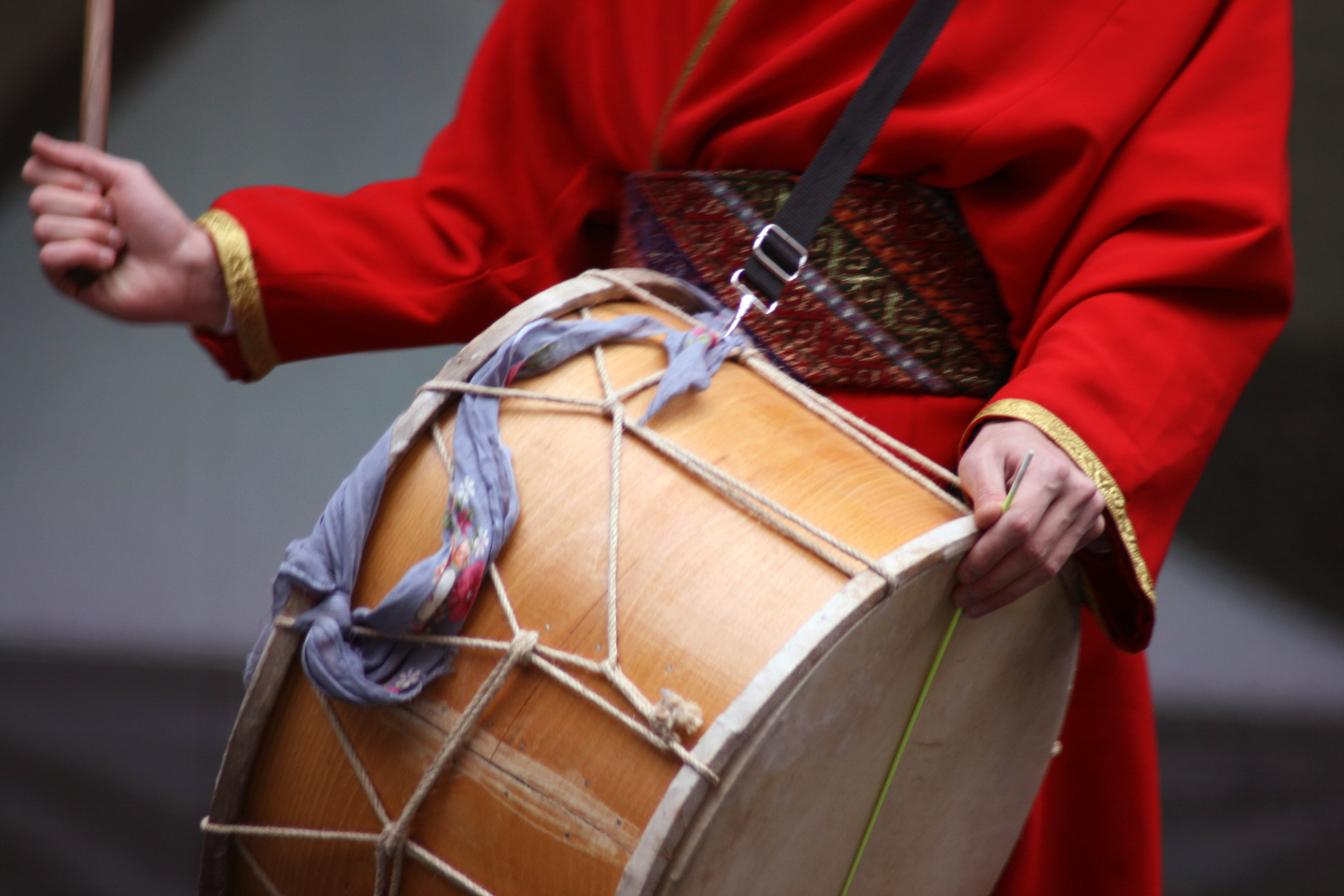
A mehter war drum, similar to the one sent to Osman from the Seljuk Sultan

Osman's latest victory was his greatest up to that date. Seljuk Sultan Alâeddin Kayqubad III expressed his deep appreciation for Osman's accomplishments in the name of the Seljuks and Islam, giving him the title of Ḥaḍrat ʻUthmān ghāzī marzubān 'Âli Jâh ʻUthmān Shāh (the honourable conqueror and border guardian Osman Shāh). The Sultan also bestowed upon Osman the governance of all the land he did conquered as well as the towns of Eskişehir and İnönü. Moreover, The Seljuk Sultan issued a decree exempting Osman from all types of taxes. Osman also received several gifts from the Sultan reflecting the new high stature to the Seljuk court. These gifts included: a golden war banner, a mehter (war drum), a tuğ (a pole with circularly arranged horse tail hairs), a tassel, a gilded sword, a loose saddle, and one hundred thousand dirhams. The decree also included the recognition of Osman's right to be mentioned in the Friday khuṭbah in all areas subject to him, and was permitted to mint coins in his name. Thus, Osman became a Sultan, but lacking only the title.

It is narrated that when drums were beaten announcing Sultan's Kayqubad's arrival, Osman stood up in glorification, and remained so till the music halted. Since that day, Ottoman soldiers enacted standing in glorification for their Sultan whenever drums were beaten.

=== Conquest of Bilecik, Yarhisar, and İnegöl ===
Soon after the conquest of Karacahisar, Osman marched with his soldiers north towards Sakarya River. Upon his arrival there, he raided and looted the forts of Göynük and Yenice Taraklı. Many argue that during this time, Osman received a message from his Byzantine friend Köse Mihal, warning him of a secret conspiracy that was being prepared by the tekfurs of Bilecik and Yarhisar. The two were aiming at killing Osman after inviting him to attend their children's wedding. Osman was disappointed by being betrayed by Bilecik's tekfur. That is because he considered the relationship with Bilecik to have been built on trust and good faith, as demonstrated by the aforementioned custom of his clan leaving their belongings in this fortress whenever they moved between grazing areas. Osman devised a plan to escape the trap and take over the fortress. He sent forty of his soldiers carrying some of the clan's belongings to be kept in Bilecik, while most of its inhabitants were outside attending the wedding. Once his men entered the fort, they quickly overpowered its small garrison, and it fell to the Ottomans. Then, Osman went to the feast followed by some Byzantine knights who were easily ambushed by his men later. A short battle took place in which Osman was victorious, and most of the Byzantines were killed. After that, Osman rode towards Yarhisar and took it by surprise; A large part of the fort's garrison was killed, while the rest were taken prisoners. The tekfur's daughter Holophira, was also captured in this action, she soon became Osman's daughter in law, having married his son Orhan sometime later, and her name was changed in Bayalun Afterwards, Osman and several of his men took over all towns and villages surrounding İnegöl, before laying siege on the fort itself and taking it with ease. Osman ordered the execution of İnegöl's tekfur since he was known for persecuting his Muslim neighbours, then placed a new garrison for the town, and distributed the loot among his men.

=== Fall of the Seljuk Sultanate of Rûm, and the Osmanic Beylik's independence ===
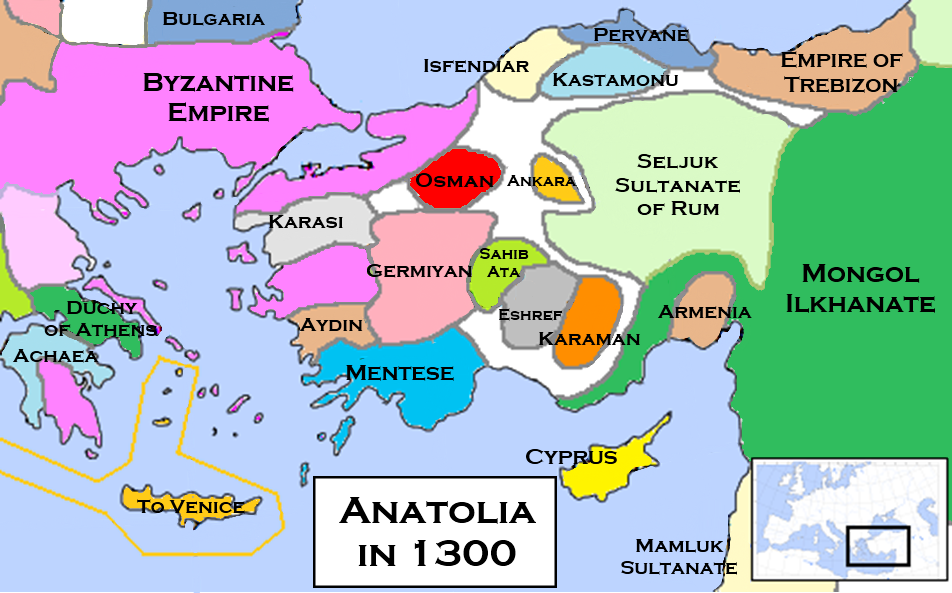
The declining Sultanate of Rûm, vassal of the Mongols, and the emerging beyliks, c. 1300

Osman aspired, after his multiple victories, to expand on two axes, aiming to isolate the Byzantine cities he was looking to conquer. First, he blocked the road leading to İznik from the eastern side. Then, he advanced from the west towards Lopadion and Evrenos. After that Osman turned around Mount Uludağ from both north and south, avoiding the fortified city of Bursa, connecting with his Muslim neighbours in the southeast. During that time, the Byzantine Empire was preoccupied with ongoing clashes with its powerful enemies in Anatolia, such as the Germiyanids and the coastal beyliks, not to mention suppressing unrest and discord in Constantinople and the Balkans. The Empire was unable to face Osman's threats, thus, he felt free to expand at the Byzantines expense exploiting the current situation. At the same time, the Seljuk Sultanate of Rûm was seeing its final days. The Sultanate grip was slowly weakened over its Turkoman Beyliks. Sultan Alâeddin Kayqubad III became deeply unpopular after he purged the Seljuk administration of his predecessor's men with extreme violence. This prompted the Mongol Ilkhan Mahmud Ghazan to call upon Kayqubad to appear before him, and once the latter did in 1302, he was executed and replaced with his predecessor Ghiyāth ad-Dīn Mas'ūd bin Kaykāwūs to keep the peace in Anatolia. According to another account, Mongol and Tatar hordes raided Asia Minor in 1300, and killed Sultan Kayqubad in his capital Konya. It was also said that Kaykāwūs himself killed his rival, coveting his own return on the throne. Another story suggests that Kayqubad escaped and sought refuge in the Byzantine court where he remained until his death. In all cases, Kaykāwūs's rule was short-lived, lasting between 4 and 6 years at most, and when he died in 1308 CE, the Seljuk Sultanate of Rûm was no more to be mentioned in the historical records, giving the way for the Turkoman beyliks to emerge as independent states.

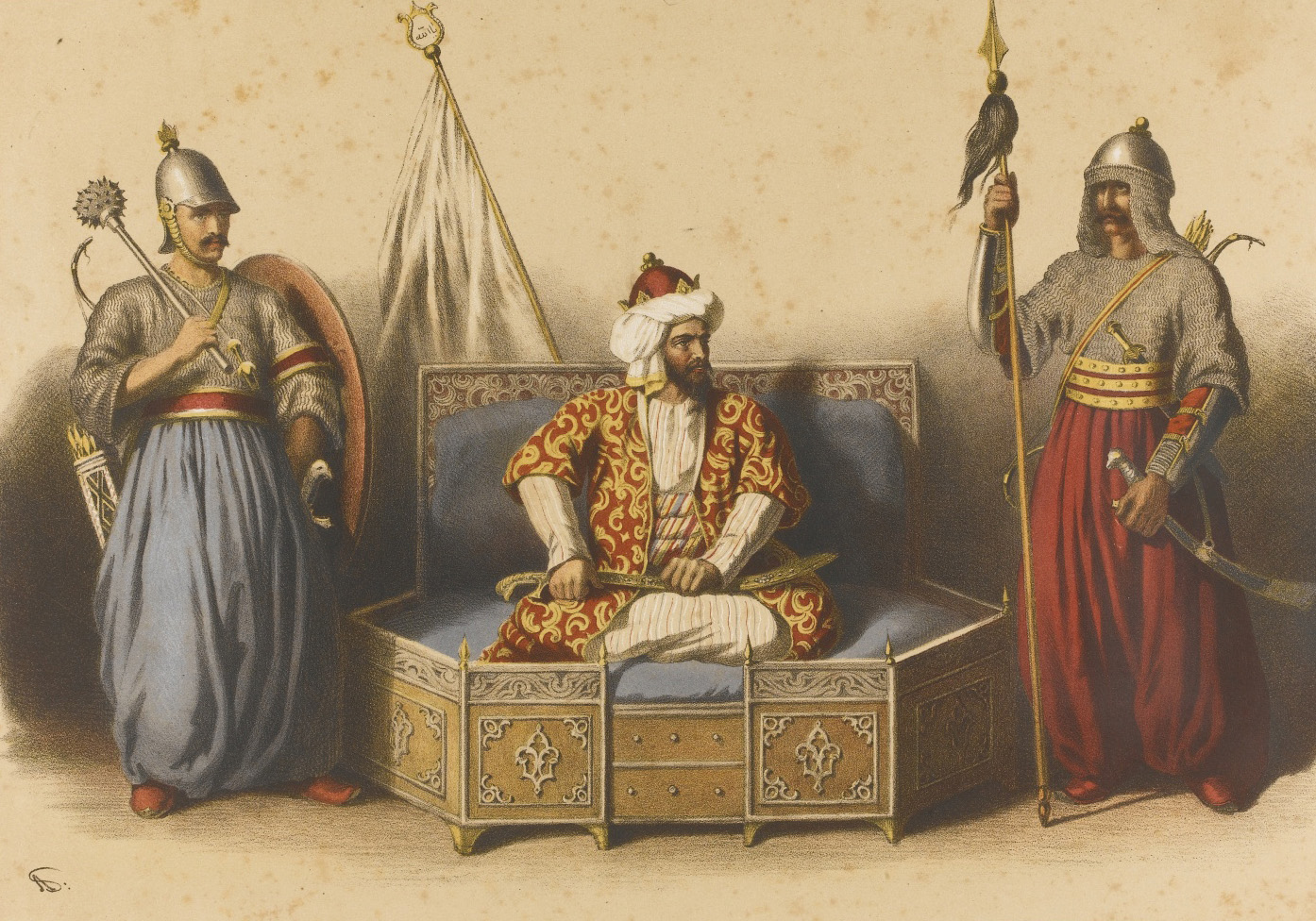
Osman, an independent Emir, on his Takht, 19th century depiction

The demise of the Seljuk Sultanate of Rûm gave Osman autonomy over his dominion, he soon dubbed himself Padişah Āl-ıʿOsmān (sovereign of the house of Osman). After that, Osman set his sights towards conquering the last of the Byzantine cities, towns, and fortresses in Anatolia. According to one account, after Sultan Alâeddin Kayqubad III was killed by the Mongols, viziers and notable leaders met and decided that since the late Sultan had no offspring, one of the local Emirs should take his place, and they found Osman perfect fitting the candidacy. Thus, the leaders offered the Emir the position, and Osman accepted becoming a Sultan. It is likely that Kayqubad's and Kaykāwūs's deaths led to the Sultanate of Rûm falling into chaos, and prompted many of its regular soldiers to join the armies of local Emirs, including Osman. This gave the latter a great momentum and important military experience enriching his army for the upcoming conquests.

=== Battle of Bapheus ===
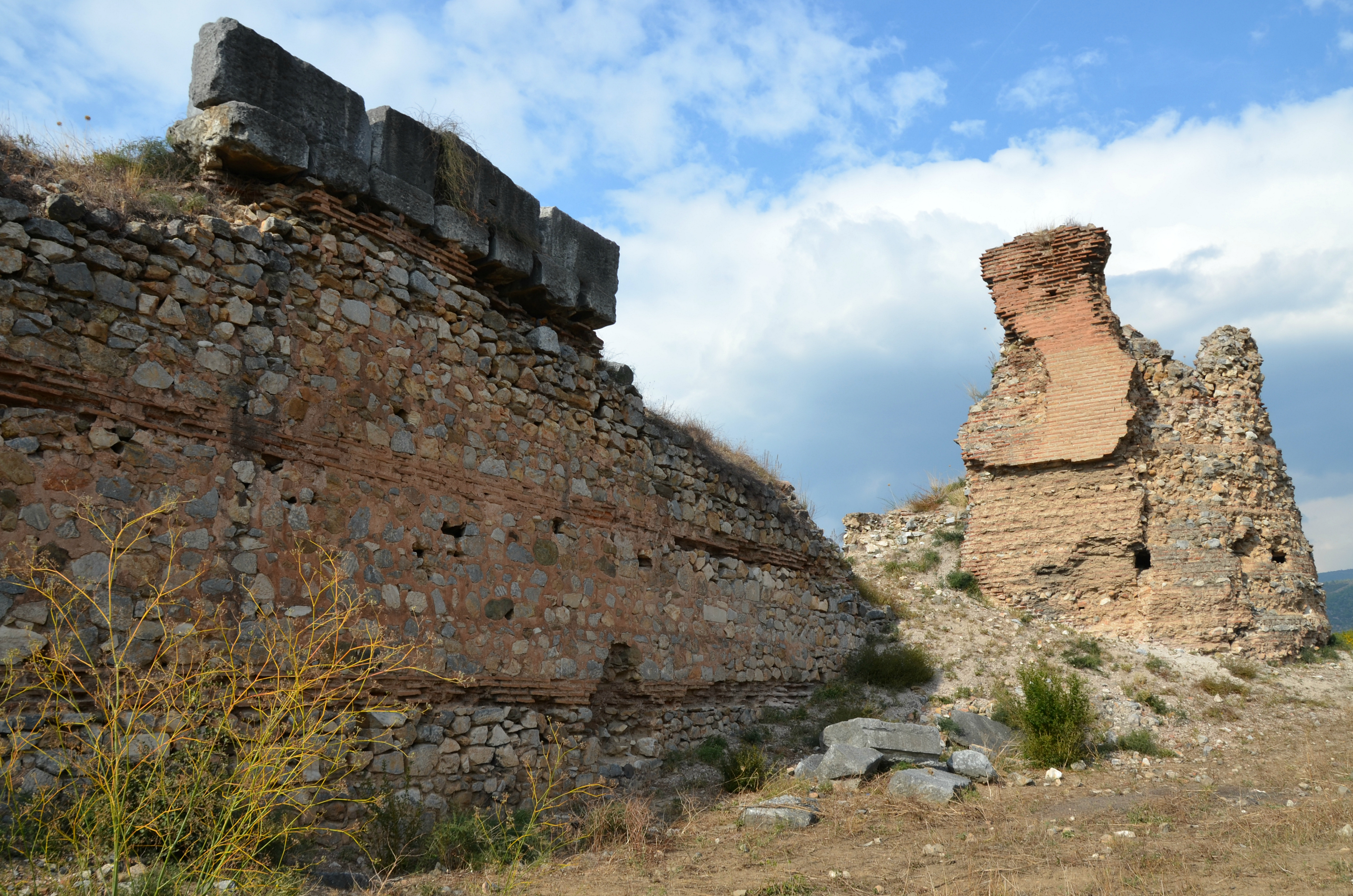
A section of the remaining Byzantine fortifications in Nicaea

Soon after Osman secured his independence and established control over all fortresses he conquered, he sent messages to all remaining Byzantine tekfurs in Anatolia asking them to choose between accepting Islam, Ottoman sovereignty and paying jizyah, or war. Some of these tekfurs ended up accepting Islam, including Osman's old friend Köse Mihal, who became the Turkic leader's companion, and would play a considerable part in the upcoming expansions of the Osmanic beylik. His descendants became known in Ottoman history as Mihaloğulları (children of Michael, plural of Mihaloğlu). Other governors acknowledged Osman's sovereignty, while the rest kept their loyalty to the Byzantine Emperor. Thus, Osman started harassing their fortresses such as Bursa and Nicaea which was besieged in 1301. The Ottoman raids also threatened the port city of Nicomedia with famine, as the Ottomans roamed the countryside prohibiting peasants from harvesting wheat. This provoked Bursa's tekfur among others to unite their efforts to eliminate this new emerging Islamic power.

In the spring of 1302, Emperor Michael IX launched a campaign that reached south to Magnesia. The Ottomans, awed by his large army, avoided an open battle. The Emperor sought to confront The Ottomans, but he was dissuaded by his generals. Encouraged by that, The Ottomans resumed their raids, virtually isolating the Emperor at Magnesia. Soon, the imperial army started dissolving without engaging in a single battle, that is because the local troops left to defend their homes which were continuously raided by the Ottomans, and the Alan mercenaries left as well, aiming to rejoin with their families in Thrace. The Byzantine emperor was forced to withdraw by the sea, followed by a wave of refugees. To counter the threat to Nicomedia, Michael's father, Andronikos II, sent a Byzantine force of some 2,000 men (half of whom were recently hired Alan mercenaries), under the megas hetaireiarches, Giorgios Mouzalon, to cross the Bosporus and relieve the city.

The Byzantine response was a warning for the Islamic border villages and towns. However, when the locals noticed Osman's leadership and military strength, as well as his devotion to Islam, they rallied to support and stand with him to consolidate a new Islamic state that would unite them and form an impenetrable wall against the Byzantines. Several Byzantine deserters joined Osman as well, some of which were liberated prisoners of war who chose to align with him, reportedly due to his good treatment during their custody. Many Islamic warrior brotherhoods also joined the Ottomans. For example, the Gazi Rûm's (Raiders of the Romans), they were stationed on the borders of the Byzantine Empire and repelled its attacks on Muslim lands since the Abbasid era, gaining great experiences and knowledge in Byzantine strategies and tactics. Another example is the Ḥajjian Rûm's (pilgrims of [the land of] the Romans), a brotherhood of Muslim clergy concerned with teaching local villagers and recent converts the basics and different aspects of Islam, and had a side objective of assisting the Mujahideen in combat.

The Byzantine and Ottoman armies eventually met on 27 July 1302 at the plain of Bapheus located between Nicomedia and Nicaea. The Ottoman army consisted of light cavalry under Osman himself, and they numbered around 5,000, while the Byzantines numbered around 2,000 men. The Muslim cavalry charged toward the Byzantines fast, whose Alan contingent did not participate in the battle. As a result of the attack, the Byzantine line was broken, forcing Giorgios Mouzalon to withdraw into Nicomedia under the cover of the Alan force.

Bapheus was the first major victory for the nascent Osmanic Beylik, and of major significance for its future expansion: the Byzantines effectively lost control of the countryside of Bithynia, withdrawing to their forts, which became isolated and fell one by one eventually. The Byzantine defeat also sparked a mass exodus of the Christian population from the area into the European parts of the empire, further altering the region's demographic balance. Coupled with the defeat at Magnesia, the Ottomans were able to reach the coasts of the Aegean Sea, threatening Byzantium with a final loss for their territory in Asia Minor. According to Halil İnalcık, the battle allowed the Ottomans to achieve the characteristics and qualities of a true state.

=== Conquest of Yenişehir and Its Surroundings ===
After securing his northern borders by reaching the Black and Marmara seas, Osman turned his attention towards the southern borders of his beylik. Thus, he attacked the Byzantine towns, villages, and fortresses surrounding the city of Yenişehir preparing to conquer it. Osman sent a large campaign to the fortress of Yāvandhisar and annexed it. Then, he attacked Yenişehir, took it with ease, and made it his temporary capital after fortifying and strengthening its defenses. Soon after that Osman started sending more campaigns against the remaining Byzantine cities conquering several fortresses including Lefke, Akhisar, Koçhisar, Yenicehisar, Marmaracık, and Köprühisar. In fact, conquering the aforementioned forts aimed at imposing a security belt around Yenişehir, thus Osman surrounded it with a series of front forts to ward off any invasions.

=== Conquest of Bursa ===
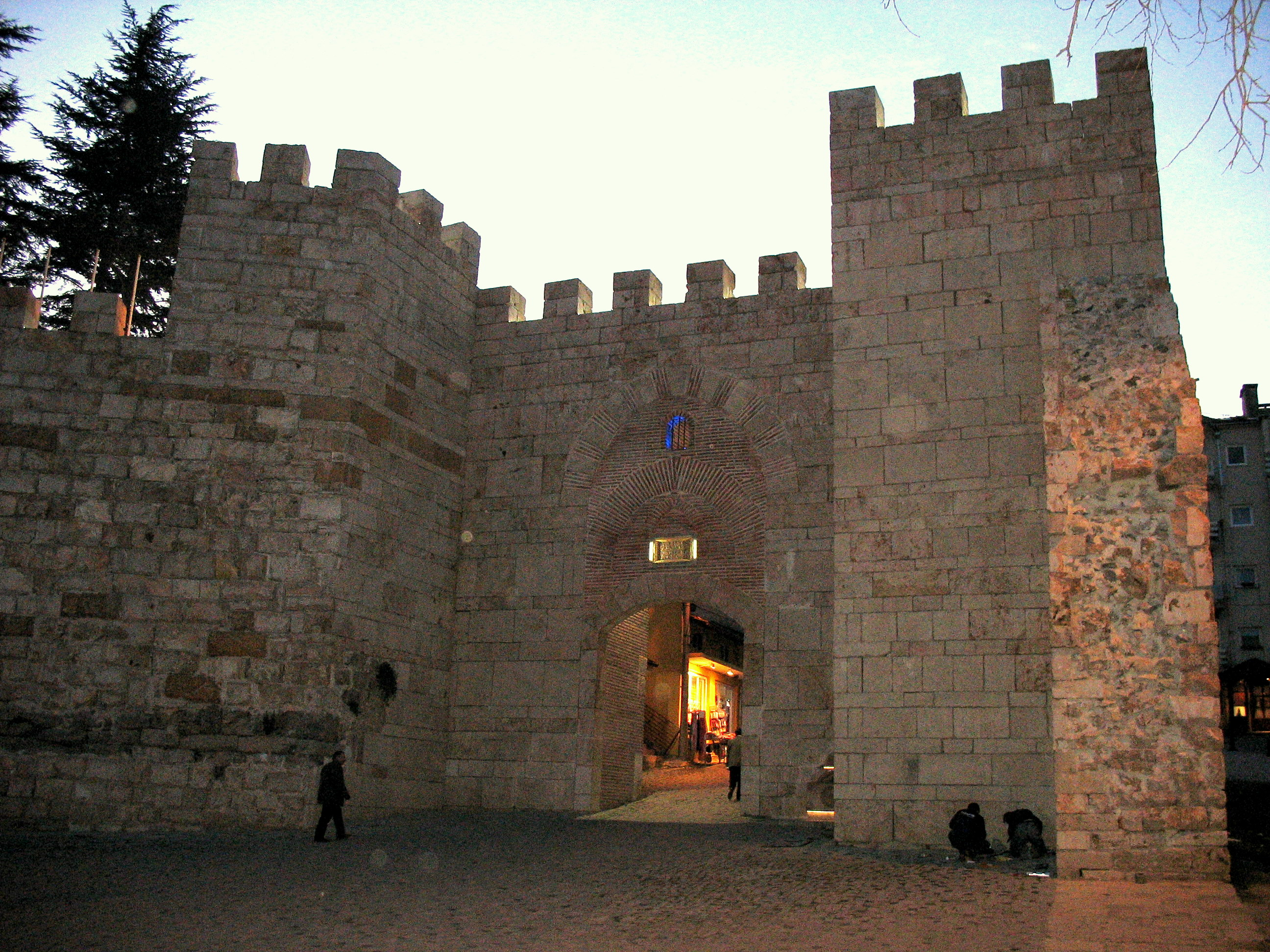
Gate of Bursa's Byzantine castle, which witnessed the long Ottoman siege

With Yenişehir in his hands, Osman focused his efforts on isolated large cities starting with Bursa, unaware that this would be his last campaign. He gave the orders to start building two forts overseeing and surrounding the city, then, when the construction was completed, Osman provided the forts with large garrisons. This allowed his men to tighten the blockade and prevent any provisions reaching Bursa. The Ottoman siege lasted between six and nine years, this was due to the fact that the Ottomans had no Siege engines and they had never captured a large fortified city before.

During the long siege, Osman and some of his military commanders conquered the smaller Byzantine fortresses on the vicinity of the beylik, in which Several tekfurs acknowledged Osman's sovereignty, and became among his subjects, some of them accepting Islam in the process. Soon after that, Osman started suffering from Gout, and couldn't accompany his men in any more campaigns or witness the Siege of Bursa, so he entrusted his son Orhan to complete this major task, while he retired in his capital. Orhan's continued the siege without any fighting, but he continued isolating Bursa from its surrounding forts, conquering Mudanya to cut off the city's connection to the sea. He also captured the city of Praenetos on the southern coast of İzmit, changing its name to Karamürsel, after the Muslim leader who took it "Karamürsel Bey". The last fort to fall was Beyce, which was considered Bursa's key as it overlooked it, and it was renamed Orhaneli.

Orhan tightened the blockade around Bursa till its garrison fell into despair. Soon, the Byzantine emperor realized that the fall of the city into Muslim hands was inevitable, thus, he made a difficult decision ordering his governor to evacuate the city. Orhan entered Bursa on 6 April 1326, its people were not subjected to any harm after they recognized Ottoman sovereignty and pledged to pay jizyah. Saroz, the garrison's leader, surrendered to Orhan and pledged allegiance to his father Osman. He also converted to Islam and was given the title of "Bey" out of respect to his courage and patience during the long siege. According to some sources, Osman died just before the fall of the city, while others suggest that he lived long enough to hear about the victory on his death-bed.

== Family ==
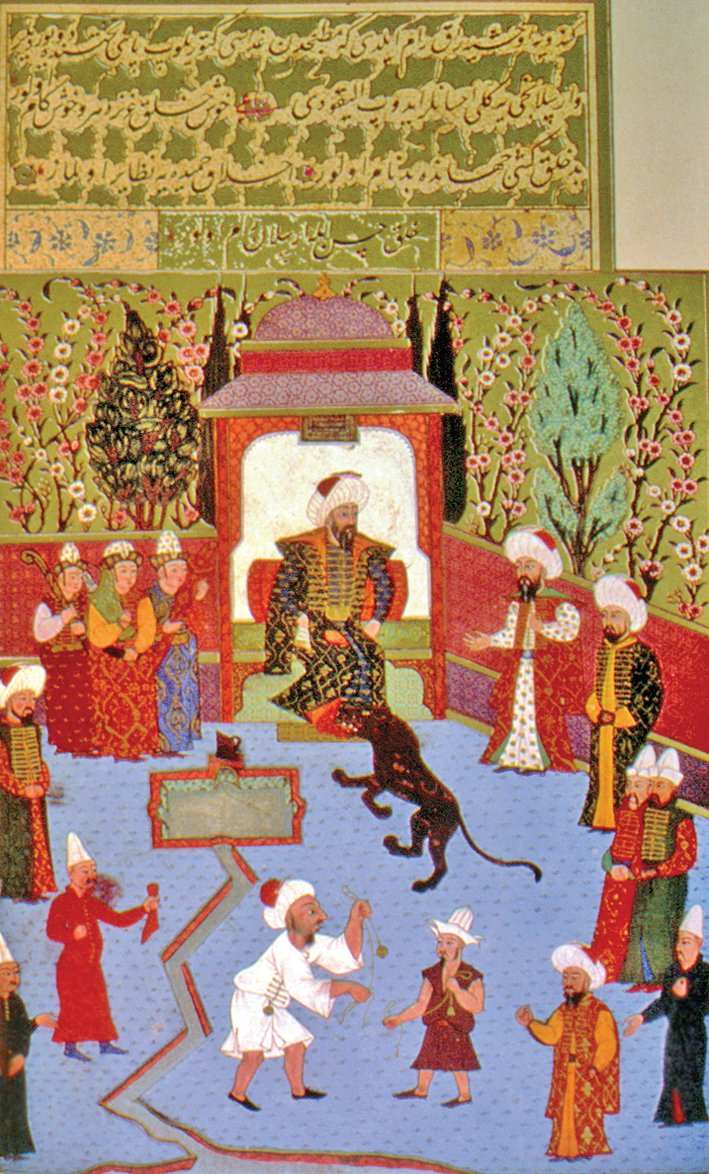
16th-century miniature of Osman I by Nakkaş Osman

Due to the scarcity of sources about his life, very little is known about Osman's family relations. According to certain fifteenth-century Ottoman writers, Osman was descended from the Kayı branch of the Oghuz Turks, a claim which later became part of the official Ottoman genealogy and was eventually enshrined in the Turkish Nationalist historical tradition with the writings of M. F. Köprülü. However, the claim to Kayı lineage does not appear in the earliest extant Ottoman genealogies. Thus many scholars of the early Ottomans regard it as a later fabrication meant to shore up dynastic legitimacy with regard to the empire's Turkish rivals in Anatolia. Yazıcıoğlu Ali, in the early 15th century, constructed a genealogy for Osman, tracing it back to Oghuz Khagan, the mythical ancestor of the Western Turks, through the eldest grandson of his eldest son, thereby lending legitimacy to the Ottoman sultans' claim of primacy among Turkish monarchs.

It is very difficult for historians to determine what is factual and what is legendary about the many stories the Ottomans told about Osman and his exploits, and the Ottoman sources do not always agree with each other. According to one story, Osman had an uncle named Dündar with whom he had a quarrel early in his career. Osman wished to attack the local Christian lord of Bilecik, while Dündar opposed it, arguing that they already had enough enemies. Interpreting this as a challenge to his leadership position, Osman shot and killed his uncle with an arrow. This story first appears in Neşri's work but is missing in earlier Ottoman historical works. If it was true, it means that it was likely covered up to avoid tarnishing the reputation of the Ottoman dynasty's founder with the murder of a family member. It may also indicate an important change in the relationship of the Ottomans with their neighbors, shifting from relatively peaceful accommodation to a more aggressive policy of conquest.

=== Consorts ===
Osman I had two known consorts, who were both his legal wives, and some unknown concubines:

- Rabia Bala Hatun, daughter of Sheikh Edebali. She became the mother of Alaeddin Ali Pasha and spent the last years of her life with her father, dying in Bilecik in 1324, where she was buried beside his tomb.
- Kameriye Malhun Hatun, also known as Mal or Mala Hatun, was the daughter of Ömer Abdülaziz Bey. She was the mother of Orhan I and likely lived into the late 1320s, possibly dying after his accession in 1326.
- Fülane Hatun. Girl from humble social background with whom Osman became infatuated when he was very young. When she rejected his marriage proposal, believing it to be a joke, Osman kidnapped her and made her his concubine.

=== Sons ===
Osman I had at least eight sons:

- Fülan Bey (born before 1281) – with Fülane Hatun. He was sent to the court of Gıyasüddin III Kaykhusraw, Seljuk sultan, to be raised in his house when Ertuğrul signed peace with him. He had at least three sons, Ahmed, Bayad and Halil; and his descendants were still alive at the time of the reign of Bayezid I.
- Alaeddin Erden Ali Pasha (c. 1281 – 1331) – with Rabia Bala Hatun. Governor of Bilecik and founder of several mosques in Bursa. His descendants were still alive in the 16th century.
- Orhan I (c.1281–1362) – with Malhun Hatun. Second Ottoman ruler.
- Çoban Bey (1283–1337). He built a mosque in Bursa. Buried in Söğüt, in the Türbe of Ertuğrul.
- Pazarlı Bey (1285 – ?). General of Orhan I. He had at least two sons, İlyas Bey and Murad Bey, and at least two daughters. Buried in Söğüt, in the Türbe of Ertuğrul.
- Hamid Bey (1288–1329). Buried in Söğüt, in the Türbe of Ertuğrul.
- Murad Arslan Melik Bey (1290–1336). He had at least one daughter, Melek Hatun, who married her uncle Orhan I. Buried in Söğüt, in the Türbe of Ertuğrul.
- Savcı Bey. He had at least one son, Süleyman Bey. Buried in Söğüt, in the Türbe of Ertuğrul.

=== Daughters ===
Osman I had at least one daughter:

- Fatma Hatun (1284, Söğüt – 1347, Bursa) Buried in Söğüt, in the Türbe of Ertuğrul Ghazi.

== Personality ==
Ottoman historiography depicts Osman as a semi-holy person.

It is known that among the Turkoman tribes, the tribe or part of it was named after its leader. The fact that the Kayi tribe became known by the name of Osman, suggests that the tribe became powerful because of his excellent leadership. Orientalist R. Rakhmanaliev writes that the historical role of Osman was that of a tribal leader, who enjoyed enormous success in uniting his people around him.

The activities and personality of Osman as the founder of the state and dynasty are highly appreciated by historians of both the past and the present. The state and the dynasty of rulers are named after him. The population of the state was called Ottomans (Osmanlilar) until the beginning of the 20th century, that is until the collapse of the Ottoman Empire. Historian F. Uspensky notes that Osman relied not only on force, but also cunningness. Historian and writer Lord Kinross writes that Osman was a wise, patient ruler, whom people sincerely respected and were ready to serve him faithfully. He had a natural sense of superiority, but he never sought to assert himself with the help of power, and therefore he was respected not only by those who were equal in position, but also those who exceeded his abilities on the battlefield or on wisdom. Osman did not arouse feelings of rivalry in his people—only loyalty. Herbert Gibbons believed that Osman was "great enough to exploit masterful people".

According to Cemal Kafadar, Osman for the Ottomans was the same as Romulus for the Romans.

== Death ==
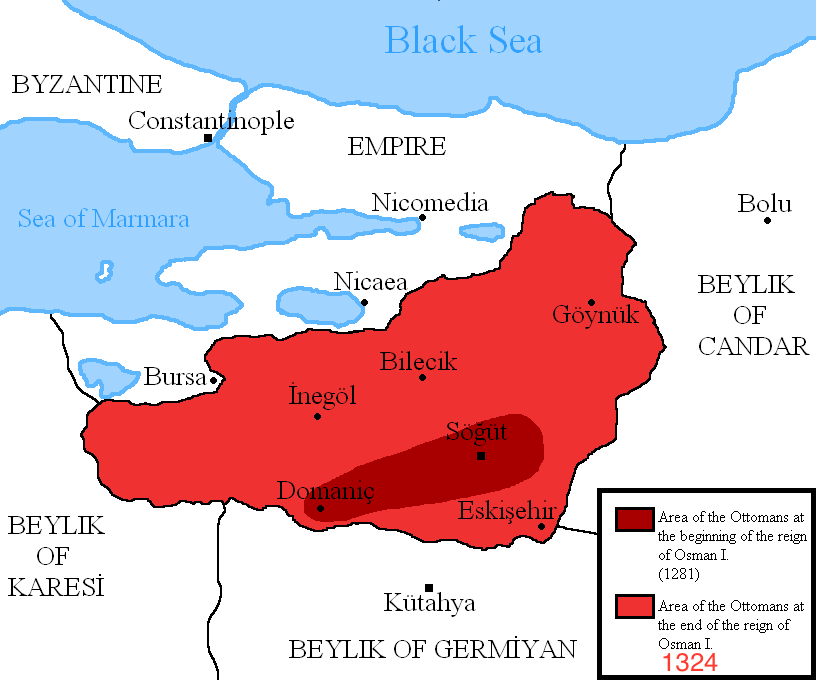
The territorial extent of the Ottoman Beylik upon the death of Osman I

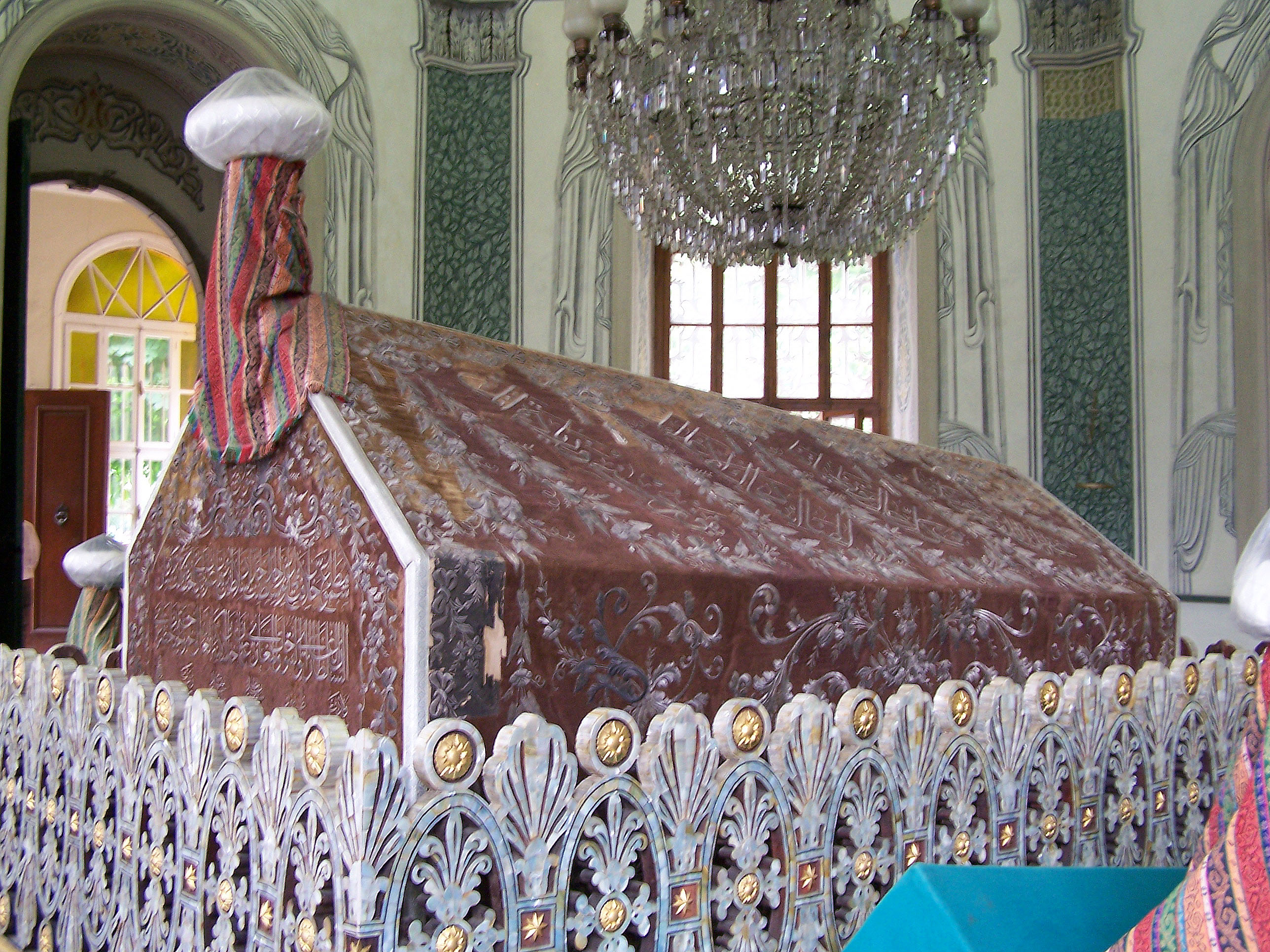
Türbe of Osman I, Bursa

According to the sources that say Osman lived to hear of the fall of Bursa, Orhan rushed back to Söğüt to inform his father of his great victory. Once he reached it, he was immediately summoned to Osman, who was on his death-bed. Soon after Osman heard the news, he died from natural causes. However, Osman managed to name Orhan to be his successor, although the latter was not Osman's first-born. Yet the dying Sultan believed that Orhan was better fit to rule than his elder half-brother Alâeddin, who was more passive and pious than Orhan. As for the exact cause of Osman's death, it is well known that he suffered from gout for several years, which seemingly caused his eventual death. This is confirmed by what Aşıkpaşazade mentioned in Tevarih-i Âl-i Osman when he talked about the late period of Osman's life, saying: "Osman had a bad foot from which he experienced severe pain". It is noted that Aşıkpaşazade used a similar expression when he talked about the death of Sultan Mehmed the Conqueror: "The cause of his death was the issue in his feet". It is now known that gout is a genetic disease in the Ottoman dynasty, and many sultans suffered from it.

The exact date of Osman's death is debatable. It is said that he died on 21 August 1326 at 70 years old. The 15th-century Ottoman historian Rouhi Çelebi, who wrote down the history of the Ottoman Empire until 1481, indicates that Osman died in 1320. However, Uruç adiloğlu, another Ottoman historian who lived during the time of Sultans Mehmed the Conqueror and Bayezid II up until 1502, says that Osman died in 1327. Contemporary Turkish historian Necdet Sakaoğlu states that, despite the absence of documents mentioning Osman's name after the year 1320, there are documents confirming Orhan's ascension to the throne in 1324. Based on this, Osman's death might have occurred in the same or previous year. It is also certain that Osman's death was after the death of his father-in-law, Sheikh Edebali, and after the death of his wife, Rabia Bala Hatun, because it is known that Osman buried the two in Bilecik.

Once Osman died, Orhan ordered the transfer of his body to Bursa, his new capital. Thus, Osman's body was laid there to rest. His grave is located today in the neighbourhood of Tophane. The reason behind the transferring Osman's body was due to a will Osman narrated to his son during the early years of besieging Bursa: "My Son, when I die, bury me under that silver dome in Bursa". However, Osman's current tomb dates back to the time of Sultan Abdulaziz (1861–1876), because the first tomb was completely destroyed in a severe earthquake that struck the region in 1855, it was rebuilt by the aforementioned Sultan. Sultan Abdulhamid II (1876–1909) also constructed a shrine in Söğüt where Osman was buried for a while before he was moved to Bursa.

According to some sources, Osman left a written will to his son Orhan instructing him to move on with conquests and jihad against the Byzantines, that he abides by the teachings of Islam, accompany the ʿUlamāʾ, amend his parish, and dedicates himself to spread the word of Islam.

== Legacy ==
Osman is considered the founder of the Ottoman dynasty who started an imperial line that would expand to include 35 sultans – rulers of one of the largest and most powerful empires in world history. The Ottoman Empire lasted until 1918, when it disintegrated after defeat alongside other Central Powers in World War I. Osman is often referred to as the first in the line of Ottoman Sultans, although he himself never carried this title in his life, and was instead called "Bey" or "Emir". One endowment written in Persian and dating back to 1324, indicates that Osman was given the titles Muḥiuddin (Reviver of the faith) and Fakhruddin (Pride of the faith).

Osman's descendants are distributed today in several American, European and Arab countries after the royal Ottoman family was expelled from Turkey in 1924 shortly after the declaration of the Republic, by Mustafa Kemal Atatürk. Eventually, several family members returned to Turkey, after the Turkish government allowed the females to return in 1951. However, male descendants had to wait until 1973 to be able to enter Turkey again. Other members remained in the countries where their ancestors had sought refuge, such as England, France, the United States, Egypt, Saudi Arabia, among others. Osman's descendants are known today as the Osmanoğlu (son of Osman) family.

A Turkish navy landing ship is named after Osman.

=== The Sword of Osman ===
The Sword of Osman (Turkish: Taklid-i Seyf) was an important sword of state used during the coronation ceremony of the Ottoman Sultans starting with Sultan Murad II. The practice started when Osman was girt with the sword of Islam by his father-in-law Sheik Edebali. The girding of the sword of Osman was a vital ceremony which took place within two weeks of a sultan's accession to the throne. It was held at the tomb complex at Eyüp, on the Golden Horn waterway in the capital Constantinople. The fact that the emblem by which a sultan was enthroned consisted of a sword was highly symbolic: it showed that the office with which he was invested was first and foremost that of a warrior. The Sword of Osman was girded on to the new sultan by the Sharif of Konya, a Mevlevi dervish, who was summoned to Constantinople for that purpose.

=== In popular culture ===
Osman and people close to him have been portrayed in the Turkish television series Kuruluş "Osmancık" (1988), adapted from a novel by the same name, Diriliş: Ertuğrul (2014–2019) and Kuruluş: Osman (2019–present).

== See also ==
- List of Ottoman conquests, sieges and landings
- Köse Mihal

== Notes ==
Osman I House of Osman Born: 1250s Died: 1323/4
Regnal titles
New title Dynasty founded	Ottoman Sultan (Bey) c. 1299 – 1323/4	Succeeded by Orhan I
