= Kaya Alp =

Kaya قایا الپ

Bey of the Kayı tribe (pre-Ottoman Empire)
- Reign: c. 1200 – 1214
- Predecessor: unknown
- Successor: Suleyman Shah
- Born: c. 1140
- Died: 1214 (age 73-74)
- Issue: Suleyman Shah
Names
- Bamsi Alp bin (Kızıl Buğa or Basuk) bin Baytar bin Iğla bin Kutluğ bin Doğan bin Kaytun bin Sungur Tekin bin Bâki bin Sunka bin Yaki Timur bin Basak bin Gök Alp bin Oghuz Khagan bin Kara Han
- Father: Kızıl Boğa or Basuk
- Religion: Sunni Islam

Kaya Alp (Ottoman Turkish: قایا الپ, lit. 'Brave Rock') was, according to Ottoman tradition, the son of Kızıl Buğa or Basuk and the father of Suleyman Shah or Gunduz Alp. He was the grandfather of Ertuğrul Ghazi and great-grandfather of the Ottoman Empire founder, Osman I. He was also famously known for sharing the name of Ertokus Bey's son Kaya Alp. He was a descendant of the ancestor of his tribe, Kayı son of Gun son of Oghuz Khagan, the legendary progenitor of the Oghuz Turks.
