= Dündar Bey =

Younger brother of Ertuğrul

Dundar Bey
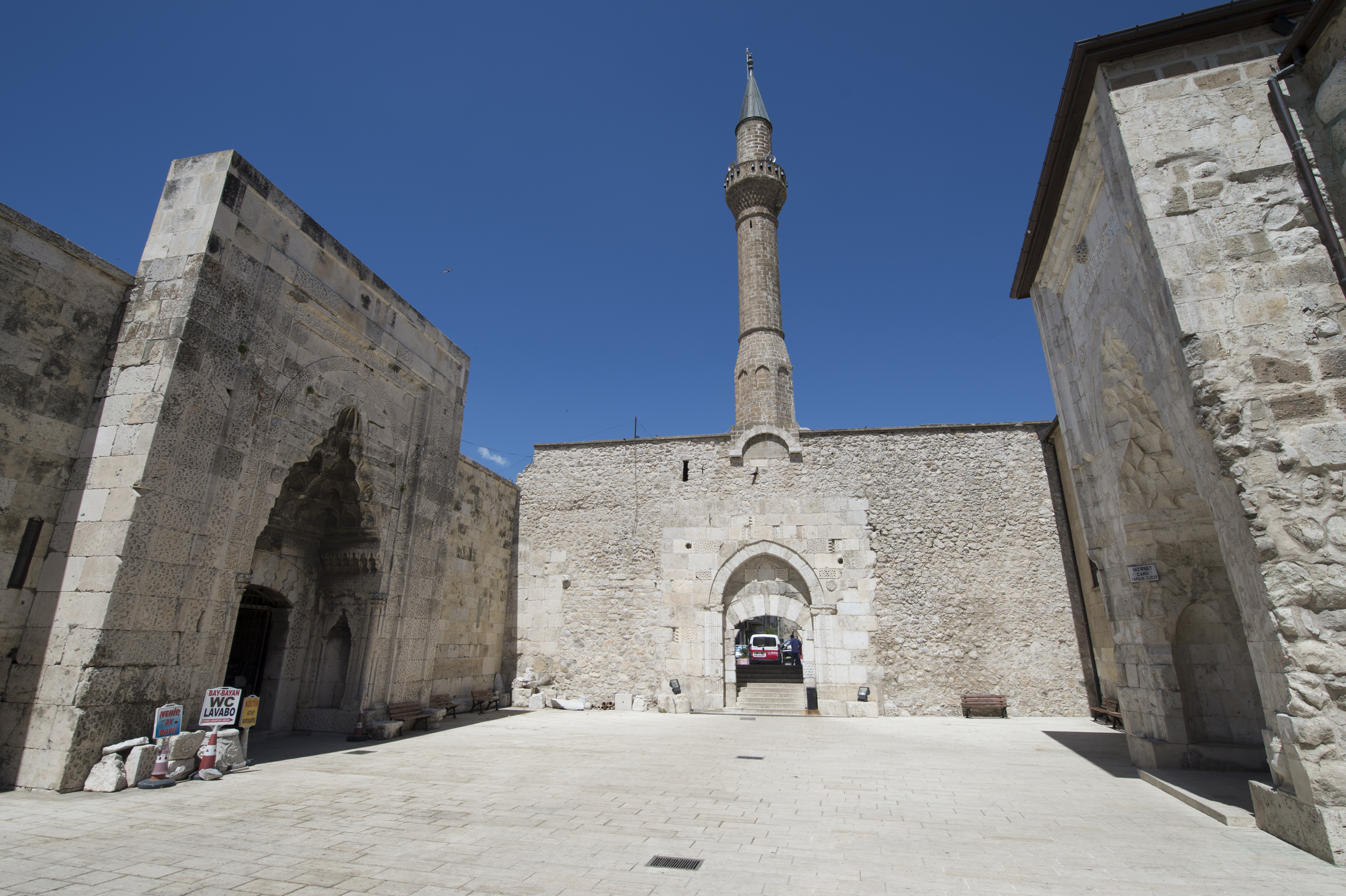
- Cause of death: Execution by Osman I
- Known for: Brother Of Ertugrul
- Spouse: Zöhre Hatun
- Parents: Suleyman Shah or Gündüz Alp (father); Hayme Hatun (mother)
- Family: Kayı tribe of Oghuz Turks

Dündar Bey was the youngest son of the Kayı Bey Suleyman Shah or Gündüz Alp and the younger brother of Ertuğrul (13th century). He was the uncle of Osman I, the founder of the Ottoman Empire.

== Biography ==
At the time of the division of the Kayı tribe, Dündar Bey migrated with his older brother Ertuğrul after the death of their father. When Ertuğrul died c. 1280, the leadership/chief beyship of the Kayı tribe transferred to Ertuğrul's son, Osman I. When Osman I decided to attack a small Greek island, Dündar set a trap for him; Dündar rebelled because he thought such an attack would destroy the tribe. The circumstances surrounding his death are, like many other details of his ill-documented life, disputed. Historical sources disagree on whether or not he was executed by Osman I.

== In popular culture ==
Dündar Bey has been portrayed in Turkish television series; Kuruluş "Osmancık" (1988), Diriliş: Ertuğrul (2014—2019) and Kuruluş: Osman (2019—2021).
