= Oruç Bey =

15th-century Ottoman historian

Personal life
- Era: Ottoman Empire
- Main interest: Ottoman history
- Notable work: "Oruç Bey Tarihi" ("The History of Oruç Bey")

Religious life
- Religion: Islam

Oruç Bey (Oruç bin Âdil) was a 15th-century Ottoman historian.

== Life and career ==
Almost nothing is known from his personal life. Based on the information in the intro of his chronicle, it is believed that he was a clerk born in Edirne and that his father was a silk manufacturer.

== Works ==
Oruç Bey's work is called Oruç Bey Tarihi ("The History of Oruç Bey"), sometimes named similarly to other Ottoman chronicles "Tevârîh-i Âl-i Osman (Oruç Bey)" (History of the house of Osman). It is written in Ottoman Turkish and describes the Ottoman history till Hijrah 907 (anno1501/1502). His chronicle is considered as an important source for the history of the early Ottoman Empire.

== See also ==
- List of Muslim historians

== Bibliography ==
- Franz Babinger, Berlin, "Die frühosmanischen Jahrbücher des Urudsch"
