= Enveri =

Ottoman historian

- Died: 1512
- Occupations: Poet, Historian
- Writing career
- Genres: Ottoman history, Poetry
- Notable work: Düsturnâme

Enveri (d. 1512?) was a 15th-century Ottoman Albanian poet and historian. He wrote a famous manuscript on Ottoman history named Düsturnâme, the Constitutional Book (for Ottoman History). His work consists of 3730 verses and is based on three parts: the first is a universal Muslim history about the Spread of Islam, the second, which he is famous for, about the Kayi tribe, and the third (842 verses) about the rise of the Ottoman Turks and the conquests of the Ottoman Empire. Not much is known about his personal life.
