= Yılmaz Öztuna =

Turkish historian, politician, musicologist, journalist and author

- Born: Tahsin Yılmaz Öztuna; September 20, 1930; Istanbul, Turkey
- Died: February 9, 2012 (aged 81); Ankara, Turkey
- Resting place: Zincirlikuyu Cemetery

Tahsin Yılmaz Öztuna (September 20, 1930, Istanbul – February 9, 2012, Ankara) was a Turkish historian, politician, musicologist, journalist and author.

Yılmaz Öztuna, who wrote works on Turkish and Ottoman history, classical Turkish music and worked as a columnist for Türkiye Gazetesi, died on February 9, 2012 in Ankara. His body was buried in Zincirlikuyu Cemetery in Istanbul.
