= Şükrullah =

15th-century Ottoman historian

- Title: Şükrullah

Personal life
- Born: 1388
- Died: after 1464
- Era: Ottoman Empire
- Main interest: Ottoman history
- Notable work(s): Behcetü't-Tevârîh ("Joy of Histories")

Religious life
- Religion: Islam

Şükrüllah bin İmâm Şihâbeddîn Ahmed bin İmâm Zeyneddîn Zekî was a 15th-century Ottoman historian and diplomat. He was one of the earliest Ottoman historians.

== Biography ==
Şükrullah was probably born in Amasya in 1388. He was from the Salur tribe of the Oghuz Turkomans and his father's name was Şehâbeddin Ahmed. He entered the Ottoman service in 1409. He served as judge (qadi) in Bursa. In 1449, Şükrullah was sent by Sultan Murad II to the Qara Qoyunlu Confederacy as an ambassador. It was here, during the reign of Jahan Shah, that he became interested in the history of the Oghuz Turks. He was belonged to the Ottoman scholarly class. He served the Ottoman State for 22 years during the reigns of Murad II and Mehmed II.

== Works ==
His works include both historical and religious writings. He wrote a famous universal history in the 1460s Persian language named Behcetü't-Tevârîh or Bahjut al-tâwarikh (Joy of Histories) and presented it to Mahmud Pasha Angelovic. His work was used by later Ottoman historians.

== Sources ==
- Muslu, Cihan Yüksel (2016). The Ottomans and the Mamluks: Imperial Diplomacy and Warfare in the Islamic World. I.B. Tauris.
