= Aşıkpaşazade =

15th-century Ottoman historian

Ahmed
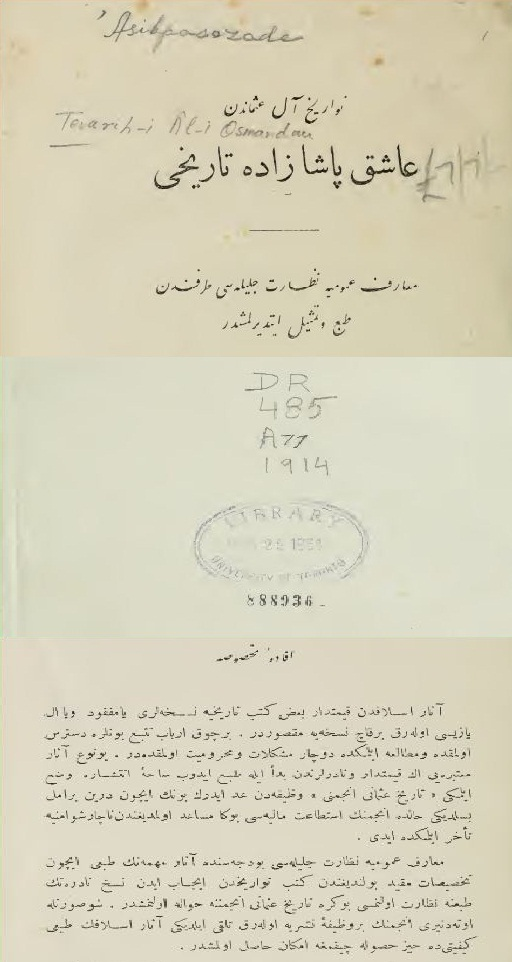
- An old Ottoman print of his History.
- Title: Aşıkpaşazade

Personal life
- Born: 1400
- Died: 1484
- Era: Ottoman Empire
- Main interest: Ottoman history
- Notable work(s): Tevārīḫ-i Āl-i ʿOsmān (History of the house of Osman), Menâkıb-ı Âli-i Osman (Story of the house of Osman)

Religious life
- Religion: Islam

Dervish Ahmed (Turkish: Derviş Ahmed; "Ahmed the Dervish; 1392-93–1502), better known by his pen name Âşıki or his family name Aşıkpaşazade, was an Ottoman historian and a prominent representative of the early Ottoman historiography. He was a descendant (the great-grandson) of mystic poet dervish Aşık Pasha (1272–1333). He was born in the region of Amasya and studied in various Anatolian towns before going to Hajj and stayed some time in Egypt. He later took part in various Ottoman campaigns, such as the Battle of Kosovo (1448), the Fall of Constantinople and witnessed the circumcision festivities of Mustafa and Bayezid II, the sons of Mehmed the Conqueror. Later in his life he started to write his famous history work Tevārīḫ-i Āl-i ʿOsmān.

== Works ==
His main works are known under two names: Menâkıb-ı Âli-i Osman and Tevārīḫ-i Āl-i ʿOsmān. The works deal with Ottoman history from the beginning of the Ottoman state until the time of Mehmed II. It is a chronological history of the Ottoman Empire between the years 1298 and 1472. The work is written in Ottoman Turkish and is partially based on older Ottoman sources, it is more detailed at the events he witnessed personally. His work was used by later Ottoman historians and became a fashion.

== Criticism ==
According to Halil Inalcik, in his works Aşıkpaşazade twisted his interpretation of the actual events to match his preconceptions. It was typical for him to simply merge two different stories to forge a new description of the battle. Some parts of "Cosmorama" or "Cihan-Nümâ", written by Neşri who was another prominent representative of early Ottoman Historiography, were based on the work of Aşıkpaşazade.

== Bibliography ==
- Aşıkpaşazade: Vom Hirtenzelt zur hohen Pforte; Frühzeit und Aufstieg des Osmanenreiches nach der Chronik "Denkwürdigkeiten und Zeitläufte des Hauses ʻOsman" vom Derwisch Ahmed, genannt ʻAsik-Paşa-Sohn. Trans. Richard F. Kreutel. Graz: Styria, 1959.
- Franz Babinger. Die Geschichtsschreiber der Osmanen und ihre Werke. Leipzig 1927, p. 35–38.
- Cemal Kafadar. Between Two Worlds: The Construction of the Ottoman State. Berkeley, 1995.
- Taeschner, Franz (1960). "ʿĀshik-Pasha-Zāde". In Gibb, H. A. R.; Kramers, J. H.; Lévi-Provençal, E.; Schacht, J.; Lewis, B. & Pellat, Ch. (eds.). The Encyclopaedia of Islam, Second Edition. Volume I: A–B. Leiden: E. J. Brill. p. 699. doi:10.1163/1573-3912_islam_SIM_0788. OCLC 495469456.
- Özcan, Abdülkadir (1991). "Aşıkpaşazade". TDV Encyclopedia of Islam, Vol. 4 (Âşik Ömer – Bâlâ Külli̇yesi̇) (in Turkish). Istanbul: Presidency of Religious Affairs, Centre for Islamic Studies. pp. 6–7. ISBN 978-975-389-431-9.
