= Neşri =

16th-century Ottoman historian

Neşri Hüseyn ibn Eyne Beg
- Title: Neshri

Personal life
- Died: 1520?
- Era: Ottoman Empire
- Main interest: Ottoman history
- Notable work: "Cihan-Nümâ" (Cosmorama)

Religious life
- Religion: Islam

Mevlânâ Mehmed Neşri (born c. 1450 – died circa 1520), also commonly referred to as Neshri (Ottoman Turkish: نشري), was an Ottoman historian, a prominent representative of early Ottoman historiography.

Very little is known about Neşri, which suggests that he was not a major literary figure during his lifetime. Contemporary sources refer to him with the modest title of muderris (teacher), which further suggested that he did not hold a high office. He witnessed the death of Mehmed II in 1481 and the Janissary riots that followed it. He is known as the author of the universal history Cosmorama or Cihan-Nümâ. Only the sixth and final parts of this work are preserved today. He probably completed it between 1487 and February 1493.

According to the historian Paul Wittek, Neşri based his work on the early Ottoman historian work of Aşıkpaşazade, a chronological list of the mid-15th century and an anonymous chronicle of the late 15th century, amalgamating the three primary historiographical traditions which were then popular. His text became a principal source for many later historians, both Ottoman and European.

== Sources ==
- Isom-Verhaaren, Christine; Schull, Kent F. (2016). Living in the Ottoman Realm: Empire and Identity, 13th to 20th Centuries. Indiana University Press. p. 66. ISBN 978-0253019486.
- Kitab-i Cihan-Nümâ, sometimes referred to as Djihan-Nümâ, partially edited and translated in Journal of the German Oriental Society. 13. Volume 1859
- NEŞRÎ - Osmanlı tarihçisi (in Turkish)
  Published in the 33rd Volume of TDV İslâm Ansiklopedisi in 2007, pp.20—22, Istanbul.
- Woodhead, Christine (1995). "Neshri". In Bosworth, C. E. (ed.). The Encyclopaedia of Islam. Vol. 8: NED-SAM. Leiden, Netherlands: E. J. Brill. pp. 7–8. ISBN 90-04-09834-8.
