= Osman's Dream =

Turkish national epic story

Osman's Dream is a mythological story about the life of Osman I, founder of the Ottoman Empire. The story describes a dream experienced by Osman while staying in the home of a religious figure, Sheikh Edebali, in which he sees a metaphorical vision predicting the growth and prosperity of an empire to be ruled by him and his descendants. The story emerged in the fifteenth century, more than a hundred years after Osman's death, and is thought to have been created in order to provide a foundational myth for the empire, as well as to embellish the life of Osman and explain his subsequent success. When Osman tells Sheikh Edebali about the dream, the dervish interprets it as a sign that Osman would achieve great glory and fame in the name of Islam, and allows Osman to marry his daughter Rabia Bala Hatun.

Ottoman writers attached great importance to this supposed dream of the founder of their empire.

== Story ==
Osman, a young prince, was known and praised widely for his religious piety. Osman began to visit a holy man, Sheikh Edebali (died in 1326), out of respect for his purity and learning.

One day when Osman and his brother Gokalp were visiting the castle of their neighbor, the lord of Ineani, an armed force approached the gate, led by the chief of Eskişehir and his ally, Michael of the Peaked Beard. (Michael was the Greek lord of Khirenkia, a fortified city at the foot of Phrygian Olympus.) They demanded that Osman be given up to them, but the lord of Inaeni refused to commit such a breach of hospitality. While the enemy lingered irresolutely around the castle wall, Osman and his brother seized the moment for a sudden attack. They chased the chief of Eskişehir off the field in disgrace, and took Michael of the Peaked Beard prisoner. However, the captive and the captors eventually became friends; later, when Osman reigned as an independent prince, Michael sided with him against the Greeks, and was henceforth one of the strongest supporters of the Ottoman power.

One night, when Osman was resting at Edebali's house (for the shelter of hospitality could never be denied even to a suitor),

Osman saw himself and his host reposing near each other.
From the bosom of Edebali rose the full moon and inclining towards the bosom of Osman it sank upon it, and was lost to sight.
After that a goodly tree sprang forth, which grew in beauty and in strength, ever greater and greater.
Still did the embracing verdure of its boughs and branches cast an ampler and an ampler shade, until they canopied the extreme horizon of the three parts of the world. Under the tree stood four mountains, which he knew to be Caucasus, Atlas, Taurus, and Haemus.
These mountains were the four columns that seemed to support the dome of the foliage of the sacred tree with which the earth was now centered.
From the roots of the tree gushed forth four rivers, the Tigris, the Euphrates, the Danube, and the Nile.
Tall ships and barks innumerable were on the waters.
The fields were heavy with harvest.
The mountain sides were clothed with forests.
Thence in exulting and fertilizing abundance sprang fountains and rivulets that gurgled through thickets of the cypress and the rose.
In the valleys glittered stately cities, with domes and cupolas, with pyramids and obelisks, with minarets and towers.
The Crescent shone on their summits: from their galleries sounded the Muezzin’s call to prayer.
That sound was mingled with the sweet voices of a thousand nightingales, and with the prattling of countless parrots of every hue.
Every kind of singing bird was there.
The winged multitude warbled and flitted around beneath the fresh living roof of the interlacing branches of the all-overarching tree; and every leaf of that tree was in shape like unto a scimitar.
Suddenly there arose a mighty wind, and turned the points of the sword-leaves towards the various cities of the world, but especially towards Constantinople.
That city, placed at the junction of two seas and two continents, seemed like a diamond set between two sapphires and two emeralds, to form the most precious stone in a ring of universal empire.
Osman thought that he was in the act of placing that visional ring on his finger, when he awoke.

== Interpretation and criticism ==
Most of the translation in this text is based on History of Ottoman Turks (1878), which was also based on Von Hammer's research. The text is modernized and has some missing sections.

Scholars agree that the story was not contemporary to Osman and Edebali's daughter and that it was created in a later period. However, it is known that Sheikh Edebali was indeed a historical figure and that Osman really married his daughter, Rabia Bala.

== In popular culture ==
This dream was also shown in the Turkish TV series, Kuruluş: Osman.

== Bibliography ==
- Finkel, Caroline (2005). Osman's Dream: The Story of the Ottoman Empire, 1300-1923. Basic Books. ISBN 978-0-465-02396-7.
- Ágoston, Gábor; Bruce Masters, eds. (2009). Encyclopedia of the Ottoman Empire. New York: Facts on File. ISBN 978-0-8160-6259-1.
- Imber, Colin (1987). "The Ottoman Dynastic Myth". Turcica. 19: 7–27. doi:10.2143/TURC.19.0.2014268.
- Kafadar, Cemal (1995). Between Two Worlds: The Construction of the Ottoman State. Berkeley: University of California Press. ISBN 978-0-520-20600-7.
