= Kuruluş: Orhan =

Turkish historical television series

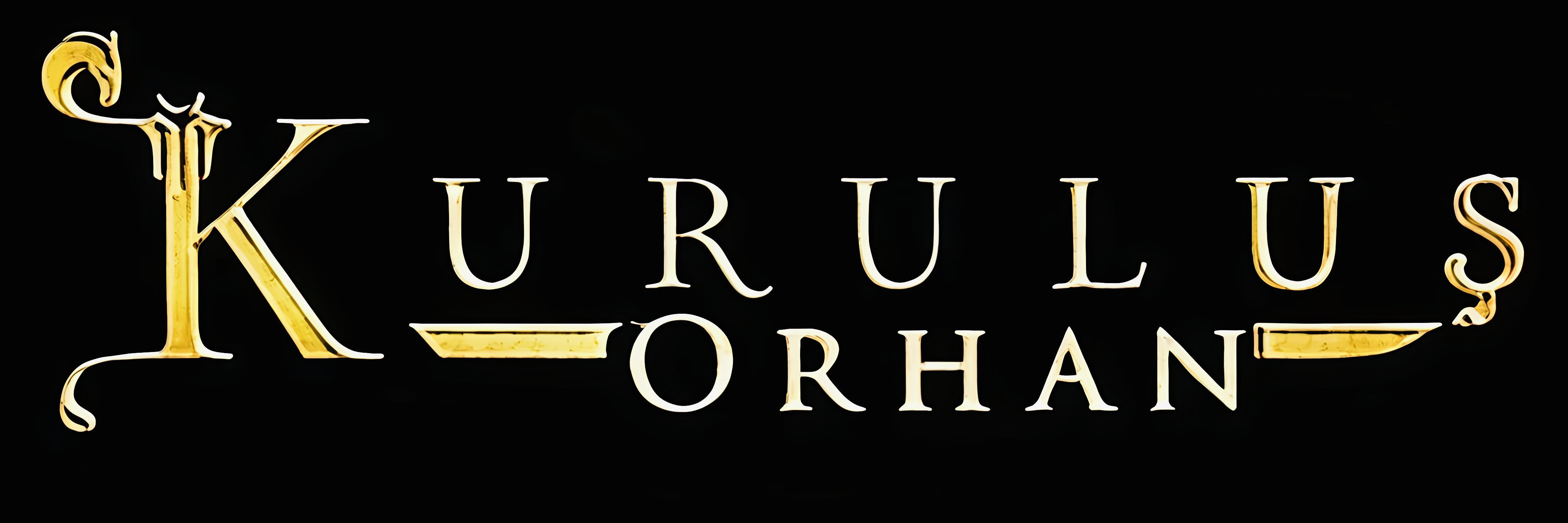
- Genre: Historical; Adventure; Islamic
- Based on: Orhan
- Directed by: Bülent İşbilen
- Starring: Mert Yazıcıoğlu; Mahassine Merabet; Alina Boz; Şükrü Özyıldız; Çağrı Şensoy; Bennu Yıldırımlar; Barış Falay; Ömer Faruk Aran; Belgin Şimşek; Cemre Gümeli
- Country of origin: Turkey
- Original language: Turkish
- No. of seasons: 1
- No. of episodes: 26 (list of episodes)

Production
- Executive producer: Mehmet Bozdağ
- Producers: Mehmet Bozdağ; Fozan Khan
- Production locations: Riva, Istanbul, Turkey
- Cinematography: Ömer Faruk Karacan
- Running time: 120–150 minutes
- Production company: Bozdağ Film
- Budget: $71 million

Original release
- Network: ATV
- Release: 29 October 2025 – 10 June 2026

Related
- Diriliş: Ertuğrul; Kuruluş: Osman

Kuruluş: Orhan (lit. 'Establishment: Orhan' ) is a Turkish historical drama television series that depicts the life and reign of Orhan, the second sultan of the Ottoman Empire. Produced by Mehmet Bozdağ and Fozan Khan under Bozdağ Film, the series serves as a direct sequel to Kuruluş: Osman and the third installment in the Diriliş: Ertuğrul. The series follows Orhan's efforts to strengthen and expand the early Ottoman beylik amid political rivalries, warfare, and personal struggles. It focuses on critical historical developments during Orhan's reign, including the capture of Bursa and Ottoman expansion into Rumelia.

== Plot summary ==
The series begins with succession plan. A central conflict initially emerges between his sons, the fiercely capable warrior Orhan and the politically minded Alaeddin Ali Pasha, regarding the military command of the state. Following an early tactical failure outside the fortified city of Bursa, Orhan is temporarily stripped of command and faces political resistance from traditional tribal leaders. However, after the passing of Osman Bey, Orhan successfully unites the Kayı factions and ascends as the sovereign ruler (Sultan), immediately launching an aggressive campaign to realize his father's ultimate dream: the conquest of Bursa. The early narrative centers around the grueling, multi-year siege of Bursa. In the season finale, Evrenos’s/Flavius innocence is cleared, allowing for a long-delayed reunion with Fatma. Facing a combined naval and land offensive from the Byzantine Emperor and the rebellious Şahinşah Bey, Sultan Orhan coordinates an audacious military maneuver to burn the enemy fleet in Karesi Harbor. The season concludes with Orhan capturing the traitorous Şahinşah Bey, successfully capturing key outposts in northwestern Anatolia, and setting his sights on expanding the Ottoman Empire into Thrace and Rumelia.

== Critical reception ==
Despite being a sequel to Kuruluş Osman, the series was criticized for its repetitive narrative structure, excessive creative liberties, and preference for nationalistic melodrama over historical authenticity just like season 6 of Kuruluş Osman. Particular criticism was directed at the show’s heavy emphasis on fictionalized feuds, shouting matches, and poisoning plots between Nilüfer Hatun and Asporça Hatun, which many felt reduced one of the most significant periods of early Ottoman history to the level of a conventional soap opera. Amid declining viewership and mounting criticism, the series was ultimately brought to an end after just 26 episodes

== Cast and characters ==
Actor	Character	Character Description	Seasons
Mert Yazıcıoğlu	Sultan Orhan Ghazi	He is the eldest son of Osman Bey and his second wife Malhun Hatun, the former Bey of Kayi Beylik and the current Sultan of the newly established Ottoman Empire. Husband of Efendize Elcim Hatun (deceased), Nilüfer Hatun, and Prenses Asporca Palaiologos. The older brother of Alaeddin Ali Pasha, Fatma Hatun, and Halime Hatun. He is the father of Süleyman Bey , Kasım Bey and Murad I , adoptive father to Gulsum Hatun, and Uncle to Hizir bey in the series. Following the legacy of his father, Orhan Ghazi expands the state through both military conquest and political strategy. After the conquest of Bursa, he becomes the First Sultan of the ottoman Beylik followed by strengthening his alliances with the emperor.	1
Mahassine Merabet	Nilüfer Hatun	She is the step-daughter of a Yarihisar tekfur, the second wife and childhood love of Sultan Orhan, mother of Süleyman Bey, Kasım Bey and Murad I. Adoptive mother to Gulsum Hatun, and Elder biological sister of Dafne Hatun in the series. She is the Head lady of the Kayi Beylik later Ottoman Empire.	1
Alina Boz	Prenses Asporça Palaiologos/Asporça Hatun	She is a Byzantine princess of the Palaiologos Dynasty, daughter of Byzantine Emperor Andronikos II Palaiologos. Third wife of Sultan Orhan, step mother of Süleyman Pasha, Kasim, and Murad I.	1
Bennu Yıldırımlar	Malhun Hatun	She is the daughter of Ömer Bey, the second wife of Osman Bey and the mother of Sultan Orhan and Fatma Hatun as well as the step-mother of Şehzade Alaeddin Ali and Halime Hatun in the series. Previous head lady of Kayi Tribe. She is Mother-in-law of Elcim Hatun, Nilufer Hatun, Asporca Hatun and step mother-in-law of Gonca Hatun. Grandmother to Suleyman, Kasim,Murad and Hizir.	1
Ömer Faruk Aran	Grand Vizier Alaeddin Ali Pasha	Alaeddin Ali Pasha is the second son of Osman Bey and his first wife, Bala Hatun (deceased), and the first Grand Vizier of the Ottoman Empire. The husband of Gonca Hatun and the father of Hizir Bey and Hayme Hatun (deceased). He is also the younger brother of Sultan Orhan and the older brother of Fatma Hatun and Halime Hatun. Uncle to Suleyman, Kasim and Murad in the series.	1
Belgin Şimşek	Gonca Hatun	Gonca is the daughter of Germiyanid Yakub Bey and his wife Saadet Hatun. She is the younger sister of Mehmed Bey. Gonca is the only wife of Şehzade Alaeddin Ali in the series. Mother of Hizir Bey and the late Hayme Hatun who died at birth	1
Cemre Gümeli	Fatma Hatun	She is the daughter of Osman Bey and his second wife Malhun Hatun. Younger sister of Orhan Gazi and Alaeddin Ali Bey. Older sister of Halime Hatun. Aunt to Suleyman, Kasim, Murad and Hizir. Evrenos Bey's Wife, Anastasia's Adoptive mother, Head of Bacciyan-e-Rum. She falls in love with Evrenos Bey (previously Flavius) under the name Akcora. After finding out about his identity as a Byzantium commander, she takes the decision of marrying Yigit bey out of anger and sadness. Despite going through gradual heartbreaks, she refuses to bring tensions in the states due to her decisions. She reunites with Flavius in prison and re-confesses her love for him. After his return from war, He proposes to her for the intensions of Marriage.	1
Sena Mercan	Halime Hatun	She is the daughter of Osman Bey and his first wife Bala Hatun(deceased). The former head of the Bacıyân-ı Rûm (succeeding her mother). She is the younger sister of Sultan Orhan, Şehzade Alaeddin Ali, and Fatma Hatun, and the love interest of Dursun Bey. Aunt to Suleyman, Kasim, Murad and Hizir in the series. She is known as the rebellious daughter of her mother Bala Hatun, and has a very straight forward approach towards life.	1
Şükrü Özyıldız	Commander Flavius/Evrenos	He is the former commander of Bursa and İznik. He is the adoptive son of Tekfur Muzulon and the biological son of Evrenos Isa Bey. Husband to Fatma Hatun and Adoptive father to Anastasia whose biological father is Andreas. Leading Bey of Kipcak tribe succeeding his father. Initially, he seeks revenge against Osman I, having been manipulated by Saroz into believing that Osman was responsible for his adoptive father's death. Disguising himself as a fabric merchant named Akçora, he meets Fatma Hatun and eventually falls in love with her, confessing his feelings as Akçora. Later, Saroz reveals parts of his past and gives him his deceased biological father's dagger, even attempting to kill him in the process. As he gradually uncovers the truth about his origins, he turns to Orhan Bey, leading to an alliance. After being severely injured by Yiğit Bey, he converts to Islam. After his recovery, he learns his father's true identity from Dursun Bey, and is ultimately renamed after his father by Orhan Bey. After contributing in saving Asporca Hatun from public assassination, He is Declared as one of the most important advising Beys and companion of Orhan. Becomes the First Military Leader of Akincis.	1
Cihan Ünal	Osman Bey	Is the Son of Ertugrul Bey and Halime Hatun (both deceased), Younger brother to Gunduz Bey, and Savci Bey (both deceased). Osman Bey was the previous Bey of the Kayi Beylik and other tribes He was also the founder and the First Chief Bey (posthumously known as Sultan) of the Ottoman State or Ottoman Empire, also referred to as "Osmanli Beyliği" (Ottoman Beylik) at that time. He was the husband of Malhun Hatun and Bala Hatun (deceased) and father of Sultan Orhan, Şehzade Alaeddin Ali, Fatma Hatun, and Halime Hatun in the series. Passed away right after the conquest of Bursa.	1
Mert İnce	Süleyman Pasha	He is the oldest son of Orhan Bey and Nilüfer Hatun. elder brother to Kasim Bey and Murad, adoptive elder brother to Gulsum Hatun in the series.	1
Ersen Karagöz	Kasım Bey	He is the second son of Orhan Bey and Nilüfer Hatun. Paternal younger brother to Suleyman Bey, elder brother of Murad, adoptive brother to Gulsum Hatun in the series.	1
Yiğit Uçan	Boran Bey	He is a close confidant and comrade of Osman Bey. Widower of Gonca Hatun, Bestfriend to late Konur alp, Goktug alp and now Cerkutay. An adoptive elder brother to Evrenos Bey. He is also a talented bard and singer.	1
Çağrı Şensoy	Cerkutay Bey	He is a loyal bey and comrade of Osman Bey. He is also humorous and an enthusiastic foodie. He uses two swords during battles. Widower of Aygul Hatun and Ulgen Hatun, Step father of Kayi alp and Biological Father of Gazi alp, adoptive elder brother to Evrenos Bey.	1
Can Atak	Kara Halil	Kara Halil, who received his madrasah education from an Anatolian scholar, is more than just Şehzade Orhan's aide This dignified, mature man is a kind of life coach. Due to his skills in being a capable judge than other judges in Bursa, he is declared the grand Judge "Çandarlı" by Sultan Orhan.	1
Barış Falay	Şahinşah Bey	He is the husband of Didar Hatun and father of Yiğit Bey.A once-loyal bey to Osman Bey, he supported Alaeddin's claim to the throne after Osman's death. Later, he rebels against Orhan and allies with rival beys. Later he goes insane after his son's death, seeking forgiveness from Orhan.	1
Sevinç Kıranlı	Didar Hatun	She is the wife of Şahinşah Bey and the mother of Yiğit Bey.She becomes close to Malhun Hatun and hopes to marry her son to Fatma. However, she ultimately betrays the tribe alongside her husband and even seeks to kill Fatma after Flavius injures her son. She enters the palace with a lady named Despina intending to kill Nilufer, Gonca and Fatma. She gets stabbed by Gonca Hatun to death.	1
Onur Bay	Yiğit Bey	He is the son of Şahinşah Bey and Didar Hatun. In love with Fatma Hatun.Despite learning of his father's betrayal, he stays silent. After discovering Fatma's love for Flavius through a letter sent by Dafne, he attempts to kill them both. He is later injured by Flavius, sparking outrage in the palace. Later pushed by Evrenos Bey into fire lit by his own father and the Rival beys in order to set trap for Orhan and kill him. He survives the fire, and seek to take revenge from Evrenos, Fatma and Orhan. Killed by Sultan Orhan.	1
Tevfik Erman	Avcı Bey	A Turkmen Bey. When words fail, his mouth speaks loud and clear. Relentless in battle, resolute in the assembly. He later joins hands with Şahinşah and Rebels against Orhan, resulting in his death soon after attempting to kill Orhan as he makes his way to Bursa.	1
Murat Boncuk	Aykurt Alp	One of the Loyal Alps for Osman Bey and now Sultan Orhan, is best friends with Boran and Cerkutay Bey.	1
Dinç Daymen	Dursun Bey	He is the son of Karasi Bey leader Yakhshi Bey and the younger brother of Demirhan Bey. He knows the language of horses. He hides his identity of being a Bey's son. He is in love with Halime who reciprocates his feelings. He works as a spy for Orhan to keep an eye on his brother and the other Beys allied with him against Orhan. He is caught by his brother through Sahin sah who learned about his service under Orhan from Yigit. He is sent to his father Yakhshi bey but saved by Halime. Later killed by his brother Demir han.	1
Burak Sergen	Tekfur Saroz.	Former Tekfur of Bursa, He was the adoptive father of Flavius and Dafne later rebelled against the Emperor joining hands with the Knight Templars. He was later killed by Flavius after he revealed the truth about killing his biological and adoptive fathers.	1
Baran Akbulut	Mehmed Bey	The heir of the Germiyan Beylik. The elder son of Germiyanid Yakub Bey and his wife Saadet Hatun. The elder brother of Gonca Hatun.	1
Mustafa Üstündağ	Demirhan Bey	He is the elder son of Karesi Bey leader Yakhshi Bey. Elder brother of Dursun Bey. He has growing tensions with Orhan allying with Sahinsah against him.	1
Tezhan Tezcan	Temirboga	Veteran Alp of Osman, companion of Boran, Cerkutay, Aykurt, Shamil and Evrenos. He also is the advising Bey in Orhan's palace.	1
Halil Ibrahim Göker	Nasuh Çelebi	A traveler, storyteller, Nurse, an Architect, and a skilled archer. He contributes to state wisdom by planning city structures under Sultan Orhan. He meets Orhan whilst he was preparing troops to Conquer Bursa, and becomes one of the leading Architect in Bursa.	1
Atakan Yarımdünya	Dumrul	Orhan Bey's comrade-in-arms. Dumrul is the embodiment of fear reflected in the enemy. He is ruthless in battle, unwavering in his loyalty. Killed by yigit and Sahinsah in an ambush planned to kill Alaeddin.	1
İbrahim Cem Tek	Balaban	Orhan Bey's commander, his comrade. A pioneer on the battlefield, a brother at the table. His presence is Orhan's strongest shield. Killed by Yigit bey and Sahinsah	1
Numan Çakır	Abdullah Bey	A close friend of Sahinsah Bey	1
Mert Türkoğlu			1
Özcan Varaylı			1
Mücahit Temizel			1
Ipek Arkan	Hafsa Hatun	She is a friend of Halime Hatun.	1

== Seasons ==
Unlike the earlier installments Diriliş: Ertuğrul and Kuruluş: Osman, the series was not continued beyond its initial run, bringing Bozdağ Film’s 12 year Ottoman-themed television saga to a close.

== Episodes ==
Series	Episodes	Originally released	
Series	Episodes	First released	Last released
1	26	29 October 2025	10 June 2026

== Production ==
On 18 September 2025, pictures from the shows first reading rehearsal were released by the production, captioned with the following words: "We have completed our reading rehearsal as Kuruluş Orhan family. Our preparations are continuing at full speed. Soon we will be in front of the audience with our breathtaking, memory-shattering new story, our new world and our more valuable players. May we all have the best in advance."

The production commenced on 23 September 2025, with the first trailer released on 5 October. A second trailer followed on 14 October, announcing the premiere of the first episode on 29 October 2025, at 8:00 p.m. (GMT+3). The third trailer for Kuruluş Orhan episode 1 was released on 21 October followed by the final trailer on 26 October 2025. The first episode finally premiered on the scheduled day in Turkey on ATV.

== Awards and nominations ==
=== Internet Medyasi Yılın En Iyileri Ödül Torenine (Internet Media of the Year Award Ceremony) ===
Year	Nominee	Category	Result	Ref.
2025	Kuruluş: Orhan	The Best Series of the Year	Won	
2025	Mert Yazıcıoğlu	The Best Male Series Actor of the Year	Won	
2025	Mahassine Merabet	The Best Female Series Actress of the Year	Won	
2025	Bozdağ Film	The Best Production Company of the Year	Won	

=== Istanbul University Project Club Club(Golden 61 Awards) ===
Year	Nominee	Category	Result	Ref.
2025	Kuruluş: Orhan	Best TV Series of the Year	Won	
2025	Mahassine Merabet	Shining Star of the Year Female Actress	Won	

=== Moon life Dergisu Ödul Torenine (Moon life Magazine Award Ceremony) ===
Year	Nominee	Category	Result	Ref.
2025	Kuruluş: Orhan	Best Series	Won	
2025	Mert Yazıcıoğlu	Best Male Player	Won	
2025	Cihan Unal	Lifetime Honorary Award	Won	
2025	Bennu Yıldırımlar	Best Female Character Player	Won	
2025	Mahassine Merabet	Best Debut Female Actress	Won	
2025	Çağrı Şensoy	Best Supporting Actor Award	Won	
