= Nilüfer Hatun =

Concubine of Ottoman ruler Orhan (died c.1363)

Valide Hatun of the Ottoman Empire
- Tenure: March 1362 – 1363
- Successor: Gülçiçek Hatun
- Died: c. 1363 or c. 1380; Bursa, Ottoman Sultanate
- Burial: Orhan Gazi Tomb, Bursa
- Consort of: Orhan
- Issue: Murad I
- Dynasty: Ottoman
- Religion: Orthodox Christian (birth); Sunni Islam (conversion)

Nilüfer Hatun (Ottoman Turkish: نیلوفر خاتون, called also Lülüfer Hatun or Ülüfer Hatun, died c. 1363 or c. 1380), was a consort of Orhan, the second Ottoman sultan, and the mother of Murad I, Orhan's successor.

== Biography ==
Nilüfer Hatun was an enslaved concubine of Greek origins, who entered Orhan's harem in 1325, where she was converted to Islam and given the name Nilüfer. The following year, she bore Orhan a son, the future Murad I. After 1331, she was transferred to Iznik together with her son.

In March 1362, Orhan died and was succeeded as sultan by Nilüfer's son, Murad. Nilüfer, thus, became the first woman of Christian slave origins to be mother of an Ottoman Sultan and the first Valide Hatun of the Ottoman Empire.

Nilüfer commissioned the construction of an imaret, an hammam, a caravanserai and eighteen other buildings for various uses, especially charitable.

The date of her death is not known with certainty and is variously estimated between 1363 and 1383. She died in Bursa and was buried in the same city, in Orhan's türbe.

In 1388, Murad I commissioned the construction of the Nilüfer Hatun Imaret, at Iznik, dedicated to his mother's memory and financed by her waqf inheritance. Originally a convent for dervishes, it was restored in 1950 and opened to the public in 1960 as the Iznik Museum.

== Issue ==
By Orhan, Nilüfer had one son:

- Murad I (1326–1389). Sultan of the Ottoman Empire after his father.

== Historical controversies ==
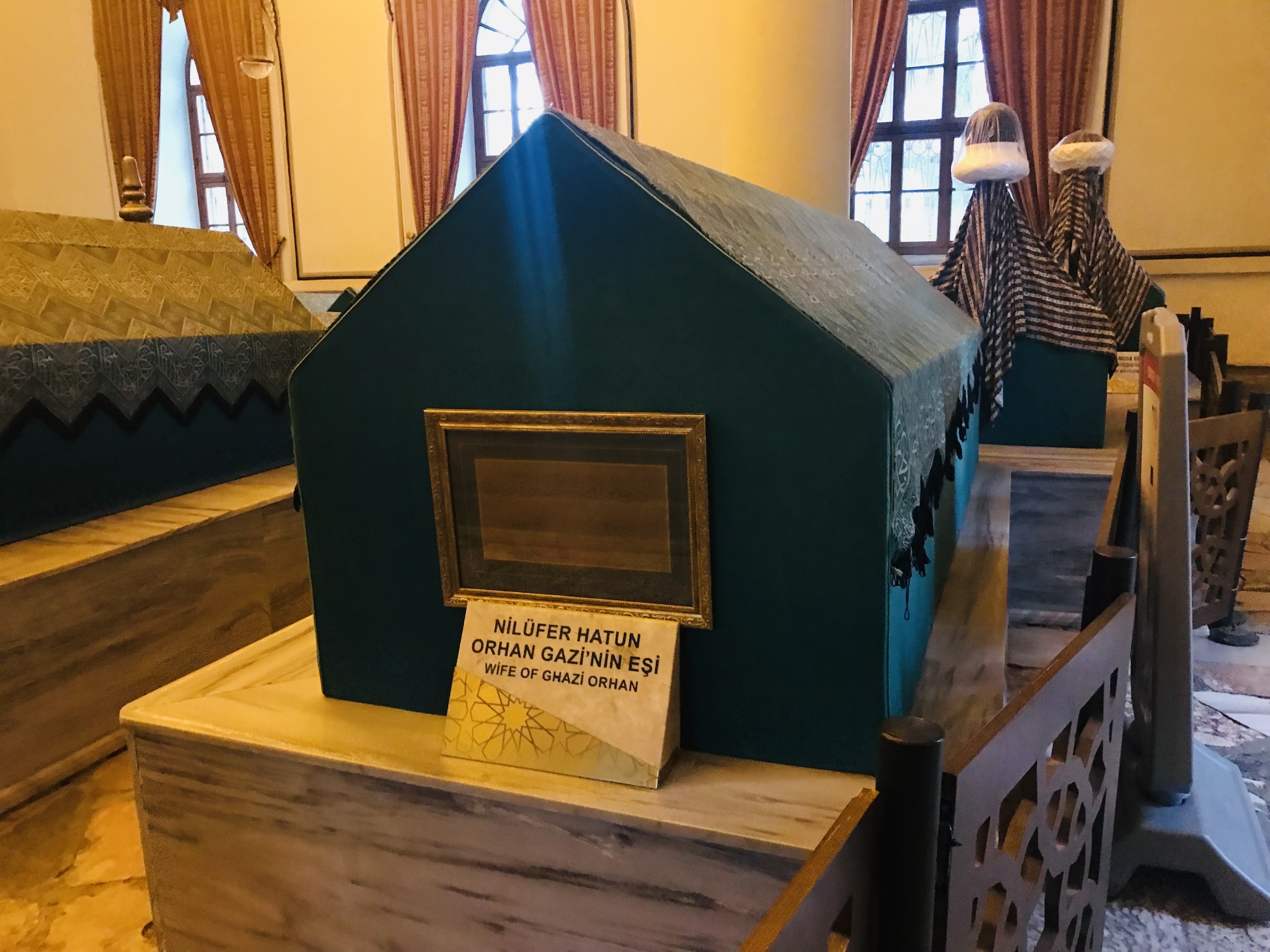
The sarcophagos of Nilüfer Hatun is located inside Orhan's türbe in Bursa

The traditional narrative on Nilüfer is extremely confusing and conflicting because, being the mother of a reigning sultan but of slave origins, subsequent historians took care to "ennoble" her, attributing origins and stories to her that were actually fictitious or concerning other consorts of Orhan, a process involving several Ottoman consorts over the centuries.

An example of this is the way in which Nilüfer was described as a Byzantine noblewoman named Holofira, daughter of the tekfur of Bilecik, a narrative that actually merges the stories of the Orhan's consorts Bayalun and Asporça: in fact, the abduction of the tekfur's daughter occurred in 1299, more than twenty years before Nilüfer's entry into the harem. Likewise, tradition wrote that Nilüfer was the consort of Orhan whom ibn Battuta met in Bursa in 1331, while this woman was, again, Bayalun or Asporça.

Another example is the fact that tradition attributed to Nilüfer the motherhood of Süleyman (1306–1357), the favorite of Orhan's sons and his presumptive heir until his death in 1357, in a hunting accident. In reality, Süleyman was the son of Efendize Hatun and was born in 1306, twenty years before the appearance of Nilüfer in the harem and the birth of Murad I.

== In popular culture ==
- Portrayed as Nilüfer Hatun by Ayşe Tolga in the Turkish movie Killing the Shadows.
- Portrayed as Holofira by Duru Yazıcı (season 3) and Ecem Sena Bayır (seasons 5 and 6) in the Turkish television series Kuruluş: Osman.
- Portrayed as the mother of Suleyman, Kasım and Murad by Mahassine Merabet in the Turkish television series Kuruluş: Orhan.

== See also ==
- Ottoman Empire
- Ottoman family tree
- Ottoman dynasty
- Ottoman family tree (simplified)
- List of mothers of the Ottoman sultans
- List of Ottoman imperial consorts

Ottoman royalty
Preceded by Title Established	Valide Hatun; 1362 – 1363	Succeeded by Gülçiçek Hatun
