= Malhun Hatun =

Wife of Osman I

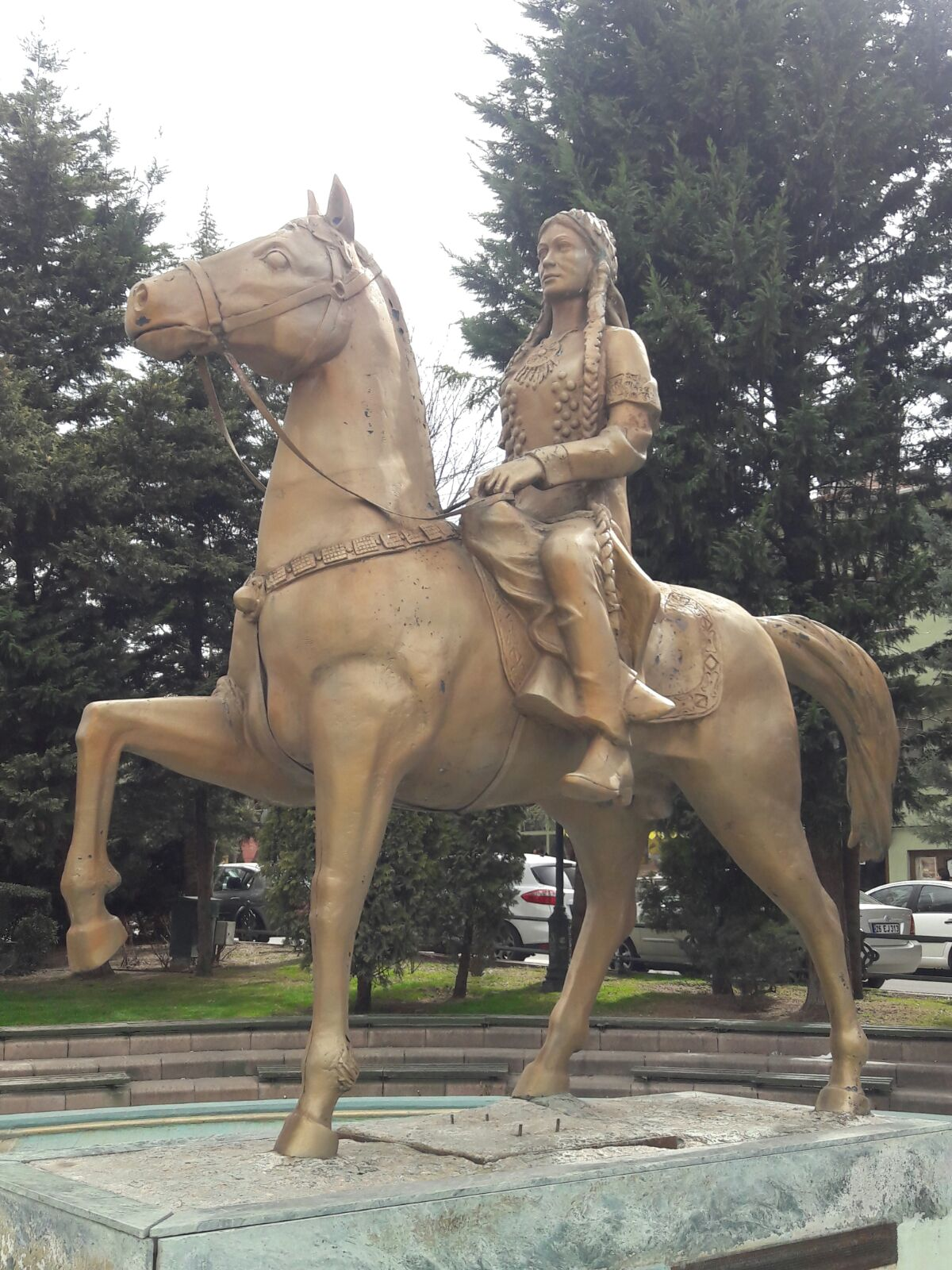
- Statue of Malhun Hatun in Eskişehir, Turkey
- Born: 13th century Anatolia
- Died: After 1326; Bursa, Ottoman Beylik
- Spouse: Osman I
- Issue: Orhan
Names
- Kameriye Malhun Hatun
- Father: Abdülaziz Ömer Bey
- Religion: Sunni Islam

Kameriye Malhun Hatun (also called Mal Hatun or Mala Hatun; died after 1326) was the first legal wife of Osman I, the Kayı leader of the Ottoman Turks and the founder of the Ottoman dynasty that established and ruled the Ottoman Empire. She was the mother of Sultan Orhan.

== Biography ==
According to some historians, she was the daughter of the Anatolian Turkish Bey, Ömer Bey. In the past there have been many speculations that she was the daughter of Sheikh Edebali, as most Ottoman-period historians accepted that she was indeed his daughter. While her name remains a subject of debate, it is now known that Edebali's daughter was Rabia Bala. Other sources say that she was the daughter of Ömer Abdülaziz Bey, Seljuk Vizier of Anatolia.

The 1324 endowment deed for a Dervish Monastery built by Sultan Orhan suggests that his mother was not, as popular historical tradition maintains, Edebali's daughter but rather Mal Hatun, the daughter of one "Umar Bey or Ömer Bey". The title "Bey", used by the princely dynasties of Anatolia, suggests that Mal Hatun's father was a person of some status and authority. One possibility is that he was the eponymous ruler of an "Amouri" (Umeri) Principality, which was located northeast of the emerging Ottoman State and disappeared in the late 13th or the early 14th century.

The Amouri are described by the 13th century Byzantine historian George Pachymeres, who says that a son of Umar fought with Osman in one of his first raids against local Byzantine lords (the victory of Baphaion). The Ottomans, according to Pachymeres, went on to assume the role played by Amouri until their demise as the principal aggressor against the Byzantines in the northwest Anatolia. If Pachymeres's report is correct, the timing and the political context are appropriate for a marriage between Osman and Umar Bey's daughter.

Mal Hatun, who likely lived into the late 1320s and possibly died after her son Orhan's accession, was laid to rest in the family mausoleum that eventually formed around Osman's grave in Bursa and is probably buried in one of the unidentified sarcophagi.

== In popular culture ==
- In the Turkish historical drama series Kuruluş Osman, Malhun Hatun is portrayed by the Turkish actress Yıldız Çağrı Atiksoy.
- In the Turkish historical drama series Kuruluş Orhan, Malhun Hatun was portrayed by the Turkish actress Bennu Yildrimilr.

== See also ==
- Ottoman family tree
- Line of succession to the Ottoman throne
- Ottoman Emperors family tree (simplified)
- List of the mothers of the Ottoman Sultans
- List of consorts of the Ottoman Sultans
- Malhun Hatun (fictional character), appears in the drama series, Kuruluş: Osman
