= Rabia Bala Hatun =

Wife of Osman I

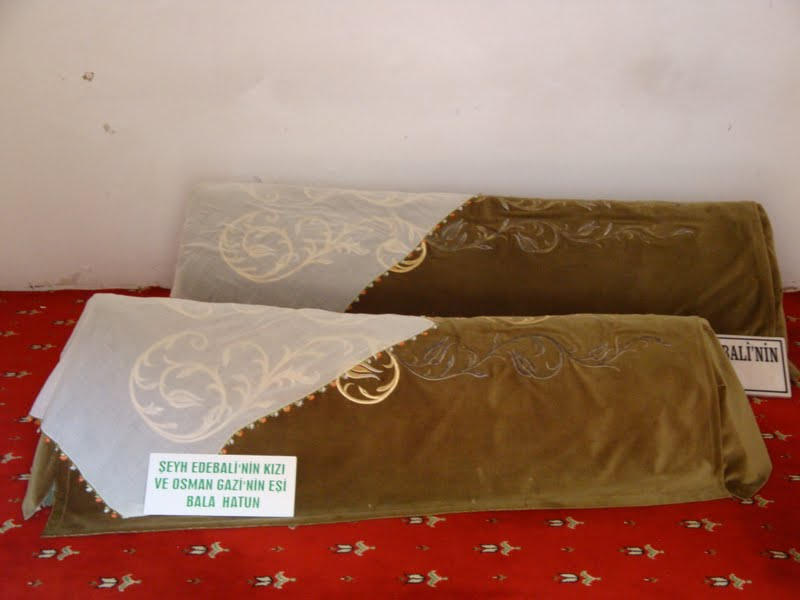
- The Tomb of Rabia Bala Hatun, located in Bilecik, Turkey
- Born: Rabia Bala Hatun
- Died: 1324; Bilecik, Ottoman Beylik
- Burial: Bilecik
- Spouse: Osman I
- Issue: Alaeddin Ali Pasha
- Father: Sheikh Edebali
- Mother: Ildiz Hatun
- Religion: Sunni Islam

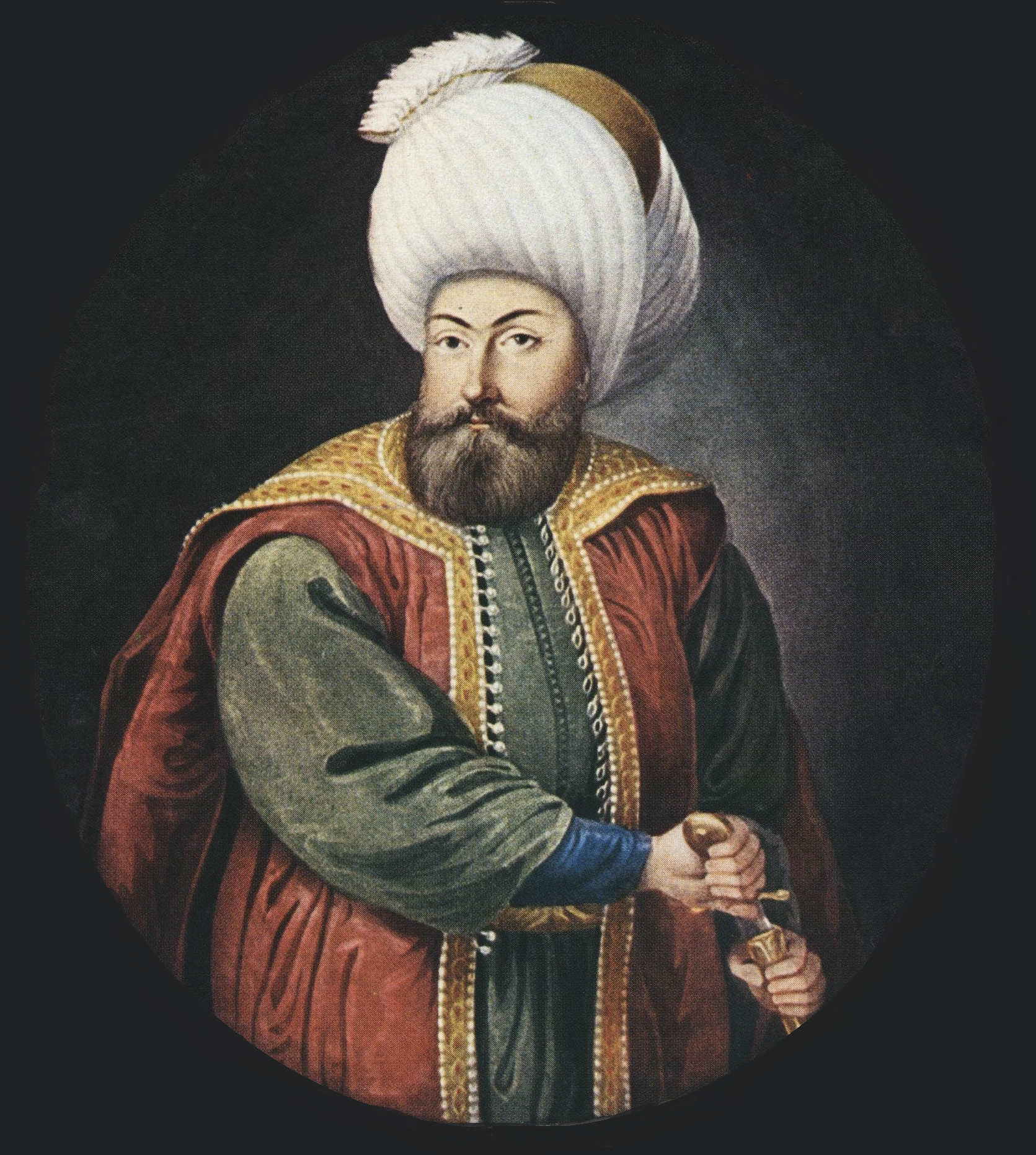
The husband of Rabia Bala Hatun, Osman Gazi.

Rabia Bala Hatun (Ottoman Turkish: رابعه بالا خاتون; died in January 1324) was the first legal wife of Osman I, the leader of the Ottoman Turks and founder of the Ottoman dynasty. She was the daughter of Sheikh Edebali and the mother of Alaeddin Ali Pasha of the Ottoman Empire.

== Names ==
Edebali's daughter is called by different names in the sources. Sheikh Edebali's daughter is referred to as "Rabia" in the history of Uric, and as "Mal/Malhun" in those of Aşıkpaşazade, Neşri, Rüstem paşa and Lütfi Paşa.

== Marriage to Osman ==
Edebali became Osman's mentor and gave him the Gazi sword. Osman at Edebali's dergah, dreamed of a state. This dream, thus led to the establishment of a state. After this, Edebali's daughter was married to Osman I. As a result of this marriage, all the Ahyan sheikhs came under the Ottoman control. This had a major impact on the establishment and development of the Ottoman Beylik. Central government records regarding the property she received at the time of her marriage list the village of Kozağaç in the district of Bilecik, where the dervish hospice of her father was located. Her father Sheikh Edebali was an influential religious leader in the Ottoman territories.

== Death and burial ==
She died in 1324 in Bilecik. Although she preceded her husband, Osman, she was buried with her father in Bilecik. Rabia Bala Hatun's tomb along with that of her mother's Ildiz Hatun is a famous historical landmark found within the complex of the tomb of Sheikh Edebali. This complex was built by Orhan Ghazi and later renovated by Abdul Hamid II.

== Issue ==
By Osman, she had a son:

- Alaeddin Ali Pasha (c. 1281 - 1331). He was an advisor to his half-brother Orhan.

== In popular culture ==
In the 2019 Turkish historical fiction TV series Kuruluş: Osman, Bala Hatun was portrayed by Turkish actress Özge Törer.

== See also ==
- Ottoman Empire
- Ottoman dynasty
- List of consorts of the Ottoman Sultans
- Ottoman family tree
- Ottoman Emperors family tree (simplified)
