= Alaeddin Pasha =

Ottoman prince, brother of Orhan I Gazi

- Born: c. 1281; Söğüt
- Died: June 1331 (aged 49–50); Bursa
- Burial: Osman I's türbe, Osmangazi, Bursa
- Issue: Kılıç Bey; Hizir Bey; Mehmed Bey; Ibrahim Bey; Şahi Çelebi; Taci Hatun; Ayşe Hatun; Paşa Hatun
Names
- Alaeddin Erden Ali Pasha
- House: Ottoman
- Father: Osman I
- Mother: Rabia Bala Hatun
- Religion: Sunni Islam

Alaeddin Erden Ali Pasha (Ottoman Turkish: علاء الدین پاشا; Söğüt, c. 1281 – Bursa, 1331), was the son of Osman I, the first Ottoman ruler, and the half-brother of Orhan I, who succeeded their father in the leadership of the Ottoman Empire. His mother was Rabia Bala Hatun, daughter of Sheikh Edebali. It is not certain whether Alaeddin or Orhan was the elder son. Some historians claim that Alaeddin was Osman's second son, but others argue that there is a good chance that he was the oldest. Nevertheless, Orhan ruled the country and became the first Ottoman ruler to take the title of Sultan. According to tradition and Ottoman historiography as presented by historian Idris Bitlisi, Alaeddin was more passive than his warrior brother, and thus stayed at home instead of fighting to expand the newly forming Ottoman Empire. He received training in the management of the state affairs. There is a good chance that Orhan was selected to inherit leadership of the Empire because of his skills as a warrior.

== Biography ==
In contrast to later Ottoman history, when succession became an issue that could lead to violent civil war, Alaeddin accepted his position graciously and there was no feud between the brothers. Alaeddin quickly submitted to his brother's rule, offering his allegiance and thus gaining the respect of the government and of the people. In fact, it seems that Alaeddin enjoyed a relaxed lifestyle and was more concerned with the fact that their father left Orhan and him no fortune along with the Empire than the issue of succession. Ties between these two brothers, unlike so many other Ottoman princes, remained amiable for the remainder of their lives. Because of his training in affairs of the state, Orhan sought Alaeddin's advice, which he received willingly. In return, Alaeddin requested the village of Fodrā and his request was granted.

In 1328 or 1329, Alaeddin met with Orhan in order to congratulate him on his recent acquisition of İzmit. During this visit, Alaeddin made his most important contribution to the Ottoman Empire. He made three suggestions to Orhan in order to improve the efficiency and legitimacy of the early Ottoman Empire. These three suggestions include the introduction of a monetary system, the selection of an official Ottoman costume, and a complete reorganization of the army.

During the years 1328 and 1329, silver coins were indeed stamped in Orhan's name. On the front, they showed the Islamic article of faith. On the other side, they said (in Arabic): "May Allah make his reign eternal."

In the same tradition as the Byzantines who had headdresses and costumes of richly embroidered material, an official, but more modest, costume was chosen for government and military workers. While the general public was allowed to wear whatever they wanted, a "coniform cap of white felt was prescribed on the grounds of the highly esteemed Arabic maxim, 'the best garment is a white one'". This way, military and government officials were able to assert their legitimacy in leadership.

Finally, and perhaps most importantly, the organization of the military received a complete overhaul. Alaeddin proposed that the military be divided into subsets, and an officer be placed in control of each section. This organization seems extremely simple, which leads to the conclusion that before this, there was no control over the army. Also, Alaeddin proposed that a contingent of foot soldiers be instituted that could be summoned in war time to fight. These soldiers, when instituted, had no training and the idea failed. Later on, this failed idea was replaced by the Janissary Corps, but there is no evidence that Alaeddin had anything to do with the development of the janissaries.

In addition to his participation in Ottoman Empire state affairs, Alaeddin seems to have led a very pious, quiet life. He had several mosques built. The Alaeddin Bey Cami in Bursa, completed in 1335, is a typical example of the single unit mosque. It is very advanced architecture, with 8.2 square meters and a three-bay portico. The dome is supported by Turkish triangles and there is a single minaret. Accordingly, the “near perfection of the (Alaeddin Bey) Bursa Mosque lies in the simplicity of which an ideal space is expressed” (Goodwin 18). Although, now after having undergone restoration in the 19th century, the east and west windows are no longer directly across, but slightly askew. The minaret, if it is the original, is the first example of a minaret, but due to architectural weaknesses brought on by the placement of the minaret, it is very likely a later addition.

Alaeddin Bey died in 1331 or 1332 and is buried in Bursa. He lies in the Osman I's imperial türbe in Bursa, built by his brother Orhan.

== Issue ==
Alaeddin Pasha married the daughter of a certain Balad, by whom he had five sons and three daughters:

- Kılıç Bey, who had issue;
- Hizir Bey, who had issue;
- Mehmed Bey, who had a son and a daughter;
- Ibrahim Bey, who had a son and a daughter;
- Şahi Çelebi, who had a daughter;
- Taci Hatun;
- Ayşe Hatun;
- Paşa Hatun.

== In popular culture ==
In the Turkish historical fiction TV series Kuruluş: Osman and in its sequel Kuruluş: Orhan, Alaeddin Ali Pasha is portrayed by Turkish actor Ömer Faruk Aran.
