= Kuruluş: Osman =

2019 Turkish television series

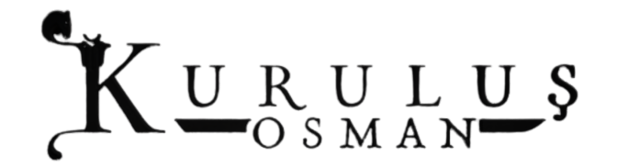
- Also known as: The Ottoman; Foundation: Osman; Establishment: Osman; Resurrection: Osman (formerly); Diriliş: Osman (formerly)
- Genre: Historical; Adventure; Action; Islamic
- Based on: Osman I
- Written by: Mehmet Bozdağ; Atilla Engin; A. Kadir İlter; Fatma Nur Güldali; Ali Ozan Salkim; Aslı Zeynep Peker Bozdağ (Note: Ozan Bodur is also the writer for Season 1 while Rafet Elçi also wrote most of the episodes of the second season.)
- Directed by: Metin Günay (Season 1–2); Ahmet Yilmaz (Season 3–6)
- Starring: Burak Özçivit; Özge Törer; Yiğit Uçan; Çağrı Şensoy; Yıldız Çağrı Atiksoy (2-5); Seda Yıldız (1-4); Didem Balçın(1-3); Buse Arslan (1-3); Celal Al (1-2); Berk Ercer (3-5); Emre Bey (5-6); Ömer Faruk Aran (5-6); Belgin Şimşek (5-6); Ecem Sena Bayir (5-6)
- Composers: Alpay Göltekin (Season 1); Zeynep Alasya (seasons 2, 3 and 4)
- Country of origin: Turkey
- Original language: Turkish
- No. of seasons: 6
- No. of episodes: 194 (list of episodes)

Production
- Producer: Mehmet Bozdağ
- Production locations: Riva, Istanbul, Turkey
- Cinematography: Ömer Faruk Karacan
- Running time: 120–150 minutes
- Production company: Bozdağ Film

Original release
- Network: ATV; Geo Entertainment; YouTube TV
- Release: 20 November 2019 – 4 June 2025

Related
- Diriliş: Ertuğrul; Kuruluş: Orhan

Kuruluş: Osman (lit. 'Establishment: Osman') is a historical fiction Turkish television series produced by Mehmet Bozdağ under Bozdağ Film. The series premiered on ATV in 2019. It shows Osman’s struggle to establish an independent beylik amid political rivalries, Mongol pressure, and conflicts with neighboring powers. The series continues Bozdağ Film’s Ottoman saga, serving as the successor to Diriliş: Ertuğrul and the predecessor to Kuruluş: Orhan.

The 194-episode series, directed by Metin Günay and written by Mehmet Bozdağ, was originally aired from 20 November 2019, to June 4th 2025 on the ATV network. The show was a continuation of the TRT 1 series Diriliş: Ertuğrul, which aired between 2014 and 2019.

== Plot ==
The story includes Osman Ghazi's internal and external struggles and how he establishes and controls the Ottoman Empire. It portrays his struggles against Byzantium and the Mongol Ilkhanate and how he was able to secure independence from the Sultanate of Rum to establish a sovereign state that would stand up to the Byzantine and Mongol Empire and would honor the Turks. The character of Osman faces many enemies and traitors in his quest, and the show illustrates how he was able to overcome these obstacles to fulfil his mission with the help of loyal companions, family, and friends.

== Cast and characters ==
- Burak Özçivit as Osman Gazi. Osman (also referred to as "Kara Osman", transl. "Dark Osman") is the third and youngest son of Ertuğrul Ghazi and Halime Hatun. He is also the younger brother of Gündüz Bey and Savcı Bey, and nephew of Selcan Hatun, whom he treats as his own mother. He is the husband of Bala Hatun and Malhun Hatun and the father of Orhan, Alaeddin Ali, Fatma Hatun and Halime Hatun who aspires to follow in the footsteps of his father Ertuğrul and their grandfather Süleyman Şah. He is extremely attentive to his surroundings and good with a sword, just like his father. He disobeys his beys sometimes, travelling on the path he believes is successful. His weakness is his care for his close ones, making him prone to traps. He humiliates his enemies both on the battlefield and while negotiating, leaving them with a thirst for revenge. He is elected as the Bey of his tribe in Season 2. He decides to marry a second wife as per his father's will, as well as changing the Kayi flag. He continues his struggle for his free realm by conquering castles like Kuluchisar, Inegol, Marmaracik, Koyunhisar, Koprihisar, Yarhisar and Bilecik, territory of Yenişehir, Itburnu, Kestel, Kite, Atranos and Karadin Castle. He also has Karachisar and Soğut that was conquered by his father Ertuğrul. He now has determination of conquering Bursa. He is a fierce warrior for his enemies and a kind ruler for his subjects no matter their religion. At the end of Season 5 he announces his free state "Osmanli Beyliği" (Ottoman Beylik). Based on Osman I.
- Özge Törer as Bala Hatun; Bala is the daughter of Sheikh Edebali and Ulduz Hatun, who died because of a disease. She is Osman Bey's first wife, mother of Alaeddin Ali and Halime Hatun and a beautiful painter having been best friends with Gonca Hatun. She is the Chief Lady of the Kayi Tribe and Head of the Bacıyân-ı Rûm. She is skilled in archery, combat, sword fighting and horse riding. She is loyal to her father, the Ahi brotherhood and Selcan Hatun. She is extremely calm and patient but is prone to heartbreak. A Mongol stabbed her in Season 1 and she therefore cannot produce a baby, and is constantly teased due to this fact. In Season 2, after her husband is elected Bey, she becomes the Hanım (Head Hatun) of the Kayı tribe, succeeding Selcan Hatun. She is upset when Osman decides to marry a second wife, but accepts her fate. Eventually becomes pregnant. Gives birth to Osman's second son Alaeddin Ali. Two months after the victory of İnegöl, Bala is revealed to be pregnant with Osman's fourth child and soon gives birth to a daughter named Halime after her paternal grandmother who died. She is the powerful woman of the Kayı tribe, and continues to pledge her loyalty to her husband Osman at all times and also accompanies him on his conquest. Based on Rabia Bala Hatun.
- Yıldız Çağrı Atiksoy as Malhun Hatun (starring in seasons 2-5). She is the daughter of Ömer Bey, second wife of Osman Bey, the mother of Orhan and Fatma Hatun. She is the Chief lady of Bayındır Obası and Yenisehir. She belonged to the Bayındır tribe an Oğuz tribe settled in Ankara suffering persecution from Geyhatu. The tribe consists of 10,000 people and seeks to settle in Bithynia on Osman's invitation, which was one of the reasons why Malhun came. She saved Osman Bey from Nikola's attack. Comes from a noble lineage of Beys formerly loyal to the Selçuk State and Sultan Alaeddin Keykubat. In the beginning has tense relations with Bala but eventually they get along. She is sent by her father to examine the western borders of the state. She discovers Dündar's ring in Söğüt, and attempts to find the traitors in the Kayı tribe herself. Later marries Osman Bey after Osman was advised by Şeh Edebali to marry another woman to produce an heir for his beylik and falls pregnant soon after. Gives birth to Osman first child Orhan. She is called Devlet Ana (mother of state). She administers Yenişehir's trade system. She is a brave hatun who supports her husband Osman in battlefields and also accompanies him on his conquest. At the almost end of Season 4 she is revealed to be pregnant with Osman's fifth child and their joy was beyond limits. Based on Malhun Hatun.
- Emre Bey as Orhan Bey (starring in seasons 5–6): is Osman's eldest son. Son of Osman Bey and his second wife Malhun Hatun. Step-son of Bala Hatun. Elder brother of Alaeddin Ali Bey, Fatma Hatun, and Halime Hatun. Bey of Karacahisar and Kestel Castle. Husband of Elcim Hatun and Prenses Holofira. Aybars Kartal Ozson plays young Orhan Bey (supporting in seasons 3–4). Based on Orhan.
- Omer Faruk Aran as Alaeddın Alı Bey (starring in seasons 5–6): is the miraculous son of Osman Bey and his first wife Bala Hatun. Step-son of Malhun Hatun. Younger brother of Orhan. Elder brother of Fatma Hatun and Halime Hatun. Husband of Gonca Hatun. He is the Bey of Akhisar Castle. He studied in a Madrasah and is well-versed in both deen and medicine. He is very brave, noble, wise and smart like his parents and grandfather. He also sometime accompanies his father and brother in wars. He is very attached to his mother, Bala Hatun. He is in love with Gonca Hatun, daughter of Yakup Bey whom he married secretly and had a daughter named Hayme who was still born. Yaman Çınar Balcı plays young Alaeddın Alı Bey (supporting in seasons 3–4). Based on Alaeddin Pasha.
- Yiğit Uçan as Boran Alp also referred to as Boran Bey (starring seasons 1-6): is from Osman Bey's main alps and a close companion of Konur and later Göktuğ, Dumrul, Gence Bey and Cerkutay. He is the widower of Gonca Hatun. He is a talented bard and singer. He uses a sword while being skilled in archery, and often also uses a bow and arrow in close combat.
- Çağrı Şensoy as Cerkutay later referred to as Cerkutay Bey (starring seasons 1-6): is one of Balgay's former men. He laughs at everything. He is friends With Göktug. He likes to joke around, particularly with Boran Alp and Göktuğ Alp. He has a keen appetite for food and drink, often eating and drinking excessively. He is the Widower of Aygul Hatun, and the step father of Kayı Alp. In Season 4 he married Ulgen Hatun and they have a son named Cerkutaye Jr (Gazi Alp).
- Ecem Sena Bayir as Prenses Holofira later referred to as Nilüfer Hatun (starring in seasons 5–6): is step-daughter of Yarihisar Tekfur. Niece of Tekfur Olivia of Atranos. Second wife of Orhan Bey.Daughter-in-law of Osman Bey and Malhun Hatun.Sister-in-law of Alaeddin Bey and Fatma Hatun. Comes to Yenisehir after Orhan raided her caravan to prove his bravery to Sancaksizlar. In love with Orhan Bey with whom she met in her childhood. Is close friends with Gonca Hatun. Despite being Christian she is very sympathetic towards Orhan's family, Turks and the oppressed people. She helped Osman and Malhun in conquering Kestel Castle and releasing Orhan from its dungeons. She has good relations with Orhan's family, made a lot of sacrifices for the Kayi even helping them in conquering Byzantines Castles. When she was held captive under the allegation of poisoning Ayca Hatun, she asked Malhun Hatun to summon Yunus Emre to seek guidance about Islam. She is a brave girl who knows how to fight and defend herself. In season 6 Orhan abducted her from her forced marriage, and they finally got married after a lot of obstacles.She converts to Islam after having a dream about it, and renamed Nilüfer Hatun by her father in Law Osman Bey Based on Nilüfer Hatun, concubine of Orhan Gazi and first Valide Hatun of the Ottoman Empire.
- Belgin Şimşek as Gonca Hatun (starring in seasons 5–6): is daughter of Yakup Bey and Saadet Hatun. Younger sister of Mehmet Bey. Wife of Alaeddin Ali Bey and daughter-in-law of Osman Bey and Bala Hatun, sister-in-law of Orhan Bey, Fatma Hatun and Halime Hatun. Being a good fighter, and a skilled tradeswomen are some of the many qualities she learned and acquired while being brought up as the daughter of a bey. She is in love with Alaeddin Ali. She is always curious about him and once got shot by an arrow while saving Alaeddin. She was used by her mother to spy on Alaeddin, which results in temporary misunderstandings. She admires Osman Bey and his merciness and adores his supporting and strong family. She was engaged to Ahmet Bey, of Candaroĝlu Tribe against her will but she married Alaeddin Ali, against her family's wishes. She is disowned by her family for marrying Alaeddin. After the death of Elcim Hatun and her child, Gonca became paranoid and so anxious about her own child even feeling alone. Her daughter Hayme was still born due to being poisoned by Byzantines which led her to turn against Holofira. Later, Gonca protects a pregnant Holifira/Nilufer from the Mongols and Byzantine attackers and eventually reconciles with her to promote unity.

=== Predecessor ===
The series follows Diriliş: Ertuğrul, which was centered around Osman's father, Ertuğrul, and how he faced enemies and traitors. It began in December 2014 and Season 5 of the show concluded with Ertuğrul convincing Berke to start a war with Hulagu Khan. This war was known as the Berke-Hulagu war and resulted in the division of the Mongol Empire into four khanates. In Kuruluş: Osman, Osman faces one of the khanates called the Ilkhanate.

== Summary of each season ==
=== Season 1 ===
Ten to fifteen years (Note: The time gap between Diriliş: Ertuğrul and the start of Kuruluş: Osman is unclear; at one point early in Season 1, it is indicated to be around 25 years since the Kayı tribe moved into Söğüt (and Osman was born), while at another, it is implied that Osman is 20-years-old.) after the Berke-Hulagu war, Ertuğrul Ghazi goes to Konya and he leaves his brother, Dündar Bey, in charge of his tribe. Dündar Bey is susceptible to coercion by others into carrying out their wrongdoings. He falls into the trap of the devious Selçuk Sançak Bey Alişar, and the merciless and psychotic princess of Kulucahisar, Sofia, who seeks to kill all the Turks and take over the world. Osman, Dündar's nephew, can see through Alişar and Sofia's plans and warn him about them, despite his refusal to listen. As they continue to build more tension against the Kayı, Geyhatu sends Commander ( Turkish Komutan ) Balgay to cause more trouble and stop the Kayı, especially Osman, from rebelling against the Mongols. Dündar, who bows down to the Mongols becoming the Sançak Bey, cannot see Alişar's anger over his position being given over to him, and he believes him when Alişar blames Osman for his son's killing. Soon after, along with the threat from Kulucahisar, Dündar is shown the truth; Alişar is beheaded by Osman; and Osman has married his love at first sight, Bala. Following this, after many difficulties, Balgay is presumably killed by Osman while Kulucahisar is conquered by the Kayı with Sofia's death happening in the process.

=== Season 2 ===
Aya Nikola is sent by the Byzantine Emperor, Andronikos II to become the new Tekfur of İnegöl followed by Ertuğrul's return to the tribe. Meanwhile, Yavlak Arslan, the new Uç Bey, seeks to create his state and sees Osman as an obstacle. Later on, they unite against the new threat created by the Mongol Governor of Anatolia, Geyhatu who allies with Nikola against the Turks of Anatolia. Nikola recaptures Kulaca Hisar by poisoning the alps. Bala also faces the arrival of Targun, Nikola's spy, who allies with Osman to save her father, İnal Bey. Along with these problems, Osman is elected as the new Sardar after his father's death. Osman decides to marry a second wife according to his father's will. After Targun's death, Osman meets Malhun Hatun and initiates a major battle with the Byzantines, historically known as the Battle of Mount Armenia, as well as trying to find the traitor in the Kayı, as his jealous uncle Dündar helps the Byzantines stir traps for him. Osman eventually executes Dündar for his treachery. Osman then initiated a major battle with the Byzantines, with the support of Malhun Hatun, which is historically known as the Battle of Domaniç. Following the arrival of Ömer Bey, father of Malhun Hatun, Geyhatu sends Kara Şaman Togay, son of Bayçu Noyan, to eliminate both Osman's Kayı and Ömer's Bayındır, but after a series of conflicts between the two tribes, Togay fails and is killed by Osman. Nikola is later defeated by Osman, with the support of Seljuk Sultan Mesud II, though he survives. Osman also marries Malhun Hatun after being advised by Seyh Edebali to marry again to produce an heir for his Beylik, who gives birth to Osman's son Orhan, while his first wife Bala Hatun becomes pregnant.

=== Season 3 ===
Malhun Hatun learns of Bala Hatun's pregnancy and engages in power struggle with her, though they soon resolve their differences. Osman Bey faces Harmankaya Tekfur Mikhael Kosses (Köse Mihal) and Bilecik Tekfur Rogatus Laskaris for Papaz Gregor, a priest who was imprisoned by the Byzantine Emperor and he later escaped with the help of Tekfur Rogatus. However, Gregor is caught and executed by Osman after he attempted to cause an explosion in Söğüt. Turgut Bey is a valiant Turk Bey who opposes the Byzantines and later allies with Osman Bey, becoming his close friend and right-hand man.

Osman has conflicts again with his old enemy Tekfur Aya Nikola who is helped by the Catalan Company, though Osman soon defeats the Catalans. Tekfur Nikola wants to marry Mari, sister of Mikhael Kosses, who in turn has fallen in love with Turgut Bey. She escapes the forced alliance and, soon, with her brother's blessings, marries Turgut Bey. Meanwhile, a Vizier of the Seljuk Empire, Alemşhah arrives to deal with Osman, thinking of him as a threat to his political ambitions. Geyhatu, his ally, soon joins him Alemşhah attempts to create a rift between Osman and Sultan Mesud. However, Osman soon executes Alemşhah and proves his innocence in front of Sultan Mesud. In the ensuring conflict, Rogatus is killed. Meanwhile, Geyhatu is captured and sent to his brother, Ilkhan Argun, who imprisons him for his treachery, though Geyhatu eventually becomes Ilkhan after Argun's death. Osman Bey and Bala Hatun are blessed with a baby boy named Alaeddin Ali. Osman then has to face Nikola's mentor, the dangerous cult leader, Arius, who arrives in Söğüt in the disguise of a Sheikh. Arius' scheming results in the deaths of Mari, Umur Bey and Umur's brother Ivaz Bey's deaths.

Several years later, in 1299, Selcan Hatun dies due to an illness leaving the tribe teary-eyed. Osman launches a series of conquests, conquering Bilecik, İnegöl and Yenisehir, executing Arius and Nikola. Kosses, who was Osman's ally ever since his conflict with Alemşhah accepts Islam and goes to spy in Bursa.

=== Season 4 ===
In Constantinople, one of the heirs to the Byzantine throne, Kantakuzenos tries to assassinate Andronikos and become emperor. However, Osman's spies in the city inform him of the plan and he saves Andronikos' life. Infuriated at this failure Kantakuzenos, along with his ally Olof (a Byzantine commander of Viking descent), frames Öktem Bey (Bey of the Kargin tribe) and his daughter Alcicek. However, Osman foils their plans and proves their innocence. Meanwhile, Alcicek and Aktemur (Gunduz's son, Osman's nephew and the Subaşi of Yenişehir) fall in love.

Osman conquers Marmara Hisar (in present-day Marmaracık). Concerned by Osman's growing influence, Ismihan Sultan (mother of the Seljuk Sultan Alaeddin Kayqubad III) arrives at Yenişehir, allying with the Byzantines to take down Osman. However, Osman spoils all of her plans, executing Kantakuzenos. In the ensuing conflict, he also executes a Mongol commander, Samagar. This angers Samagar's superior commander, Nayman, who also arrives to eliminate Osman.

Nayman allies with Ismihan, Olof, and later Valens (Tekfur of Bursa) to take down Osman, but Osman inflicts heavy losses on him and executes Olof. Öktem Bey is martyred in the ensuing conflict. Aktemur, who has married Alcicek, becomes the Bey of the Kargin tribe. Osman complains about Sultan Alaeddin's cruelties to Alaeddin's suzerain, Ilkhan Ghazan, which results in Alaeddin's dethronement and Mesud being reinstated as Sultan. As a token of gratitude, Mesud vows to help Osman in his conquests. Osman conquers Köprühisar. Ismihan and Alaeddin are captured and sent to Tabriz to be trialed. Nayman is executed by Osman. Valens, who is revealed to be a member of the militarily influential Mouzalon family is given a large army by Andronikos to crush Osman, but is defeated and Osman conquers Koyunhisar. Valens then requests assistance from the Pope at Vatican. With Sultan Mesud's blessing, Osman declares his principality to be an independent one and begins taxing Byzantine caravans passing through his territory.

=== Season 5 ===
Tensions between Osman and the Bey of the Germiyanids, Yakup are fanned by the Byzantines. With Sultan Mesud bedridden and the Seljuk state on the verge of collapse, Yakup declares himself as the new Sultan, and due to his influence and coercion, many Beys pledge their allegiance to him. However, Osman refuses to do and later finds out that Yakup is plotting against him, which starts a cold war between the two. Yakup captures the castle of Lefke and gives it to Osman.

=== Season 6 ===
In this season, Sofia returns. It turns out she did not die and joins hands with Commander Lucas. 10 years ago, she kidnapped Bala and Osman's daughter, Halime. Sofia raised Halime as her niece and trained her against her parents by telling her that Osman and Bala killed her parents. She sends Halime to the Kayi tribe as a spy. Mongol commander Ulugan arrives along with Altoga, Çerkutay's brother. Ulugan mixes poison with the water in the well with the help of his spy, Ilbay, claiming to be a descendant of Sungurtekin Bey, brother of Ertuğrul Bey (Former Kayı Chief and Father of Osman I.) Then, Ulugan attacks the tribe, forcing Osman and his family to live in a hidden tribe. Bala gets captured in prison by Sofia and learns that her daughter Halime is alive. When Bala becomes free, she does all her best to find her daughter. Meanwhile, the ruler of Mongol Empire Olcaytu Han's daughter Esenbike and grandson Sargun arrive at Osman's lands. They pretend to be Osman's friends, but in fact they wanted to kill him. But Sofia killed both of them and put the blame on Osman. Meanwhile, Osman, gaining support and power from other Turkish leaders, gets back his tribe and kills Ulugan, Altoga and Ilbay. Olcaytu Han sends an ambassador called Kuçar to bring Esenbike's and Sargun's deads. The Roman Emperor sends Commander Claudius to Bursa as a support. But Claudius betrayed the Emperor and, allying with Kuçar against Osman, tried to grab Bursa. Knowing this, Sofia offers an alliance to Osman against Claudius and Kuçar in exchange for Halime. Halime learns all the truth and reunites with her family. Malhun Hatun is ignored this season. Holofira becomes Muslim and changes her name to Nilüfer. Koca Bey and Hasan Bey, two beys of big tribes, come to join Osman in his war, and later more beys come, but Kucar has bought Koca Bey's brother, Yigit Bey. After Kucar dies at Osman's hands, Claudius takes him for his spy. Orhan Bey and his wife leave for a duty and are not mentioned in the series again. Koca Bey's son Oguz arrives to fight for Osman. Orhan and Nilufer have left the tribe and gone to a castle to live there.

== Episodes ==
Series	Episodes	Originally released	
Series	Episodes	First released	Last released
1	27	20 November 2019	24 June 2020
2	37	7 October 2020	23 June 2021
3	34	6 October 2021	15 June 2022
4	32	5 October 2022	14 June 2023
5	34	4 October 2023	12 June 2024
6	30	2 October 2024	4 June 2025

The series is written and produced by Mehmet Bozdağ and directed by Metin Günay. The theme music is by Alpay Göktekin (who died on 5 May 2020) and Zeynep Alasya. It was filmed in Riva, Istanbul and the broadcasting of the first season began in November 2019 on ATV. Filming for the third season began in late August 2021 and concluded in mid-June 2022. The show has been renewed for a fourth season and currently airs on ATV.

== International broadcast ==
Country	Channel(s)/Notable network(s)	Series premiere	Timing	Note(s)
Afghanistan	Tolo TV, Faza TV	24 April 2020, November 2023		Pashto subtitles
Albania	TV Klan	10 March 2020		Albanian subtitles
Algeria	El Fadjer TV	21 November 2019	23:00	Arabic subtitles
Azerbaijan	AzTV	5 September 2022	23:00	Azerbaijani dubbing
Somalia	MCTV	21 December 2019		Somali subtitles
Tunisia	Hannibal TV			Arabic dubbing
Uzbekistan	MY5	30 November 2020	20:30	Uzbek dubbing
Bangladesh	Toffee, NTV	1 December 2020, 1 December 2022	19:00, 21:00	Bengali dubbing
Bosnia and Herzegovina	Hayat TV			Bosnian subtitles
Pakistan	VidTower, Makkitv, Historicalpoint, GiveMe5, Geo TV	20 November 2019, 4 June 2025	06:00, 20:00	Urdu subtitles, Urdu dubbed
United Kingdom	www.OsmanOnline.co.uk	20 November 2019		English subtitles
Middle East	Noor Play	20 January 2021		Arabic dubbing
Indonesia	NET TV	14 April 2021		Indonesian dubbing

== Reception ==
The show has been well received in Turkey. In December 2019, Kuruluş: Osman attracted record viewership on ATV, in its fourth weekend of broadcast, the 4th episode of the series recorded a countrywide rating of 14.46. Mehmet Bozdağ claims that the show has also been a great success in Albania, where it is called Osmani, and said that it is the "most watched TV show" in the country. In January 2021, the show, which was one of the most popular shows in Turkey, began broadcasting in the Middle East on Noor Play.

The show has been very successful in Pakistan. It currently airs on Geo Entertainment and VidTower in Urdu. Episode 59 broke viewership records in Pakistan. After the series became a huge success in Pakistan, the then president of Pakistan Arif Alvi along with his wife, visited its set. He also met its cast including the leading actor, Burak Özçivit.

== See also ==
- List of Kuruluş: Osman characters
- List of Islam-related films
- Kuruluş "Osmancık", Turkish 1988 TV drama, based on a novel by the same name.
- Maslaha
