= Asporça Hatun =

First wife of Sultan Orhan

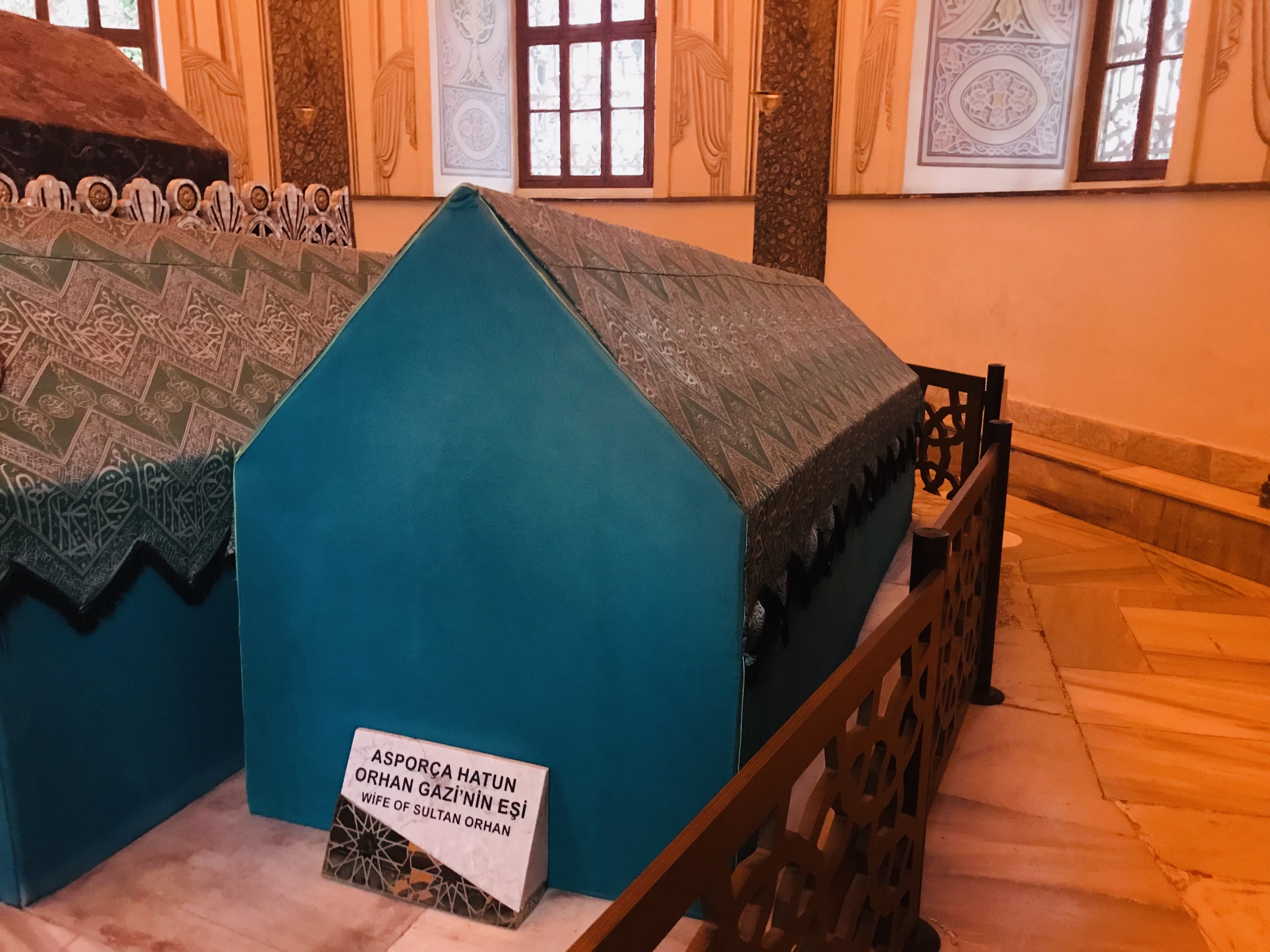
- The burial place of Asporça Hatun is located within the tomb of Osman I in Bursa
- Born: Byzantine Empire
- Died: after 1362; Bursa, Ottoman Empire
- Burial: Tomb of Osman I, Bursa
- Spouse: Orhan I (m. 1310; died 1362)
- Issue: İbrahim Bey; Şerefullah Bey; Selçuk Hatun; Fatma Hatun
- Religion: Orthodox Christian (birth); Sunni Islam(conversion)

Asporça Hatun (Ottoman Turkish: اسپورجہ خاتون; died after 1362) was a Byzantine noblewoman and the first legal wife of Sultan Orhan of the Ottoman Empire.

== Biography ==
Asporça Hatun was born a Greek-Byzantine noblewoman, but other details about her origins are not known.

According to contemporary rumors, she was a Palaiologos princess, a daughter, probably illegitimate, of the emperor Andronikos II or Andronikos III but most modern historians reject this version. It is impossible that Asporça was Andronikos III’s daughter, because he was born in 1296 and Asporça had a son around 1310. Also, Byzantine princesses married to Muslim rulers usually kept their own names and Christian faith, but Asporça took an Ottoman name and converted to Islam.

Another thesis is that Asporça was the daughter of the Byzantine tekfur of Bilecik, who in 1298/1299 was kidnapped by the Ottomans and given to Orhan as a consort, but this wife is usually identified with Bayalun and if the kidnapped girl was Asporça, this would mean that her firstborn was born over a decade later.

== Marriage ==
Since one of Asporça's children, the only one whose birth date is known, was born in 1310, Asporça married Orhan in or shortly before that year. She was the first of Orhan's two legal wives (the other was Theodora Kantakouzene, married in 1346). She gave birth to two sons and two daughters. She was highly esteemed by her father-in-law, Osman I, who gave her the revenues of numerous lands and villages, including Narlı, Kiyaklı, Çepni, Yörüklü and Frenkli.

In September 1323, Asporça signed a waqf which assigned the revenues of her lands to his descendants. The document cites the vizier Alaeddin Pasha as a witness and Asporça's eldest son, Ibrahim Bey, as administrator. The waqf of Asporça is the oldest known Ottoman document, and together with the waqf of Orhan of the following year constitutes a valuable source of information on the composition of the Ottoman dynasty in that period. In the 17th century, a woman named Saliha Hatun presented herself at the court of Bursa, declaring herself a descendant of Asporça and asking that the income guaranteed by the waqf be paid to her.

== Death ==
Asporça survived Orhan, who died in 1362. Shortly thereafter, in the same year, her son Ibrahim was executed by order of the new sultan Murad I, son of Orhan and the concubine Nilüfer Hatun.

Upon her death, she was buried in Bursa, in the türbe of Orhan. However, the imperial burials of Bursa were restored in the 19th century due to centuries of earthquakes and fires, and currently the Asporça sarcophagus is located in the türbe of Osman I.

A poetic inscription attributed to Asporça Hatun, which hangs on her tomb, was published by İbrahim Hoci and Ahmed Tevhid in Tarih-i Osmanî Encümeni Mecmuası:

"She is the pearl of the sea of virtue, the wife of Sultan Orhan.

She sat in the honorable harem of the Sultan and held a high rank.

She showed full compassion and care for the prince.

Her child İbrahim passed away, leaving her in grief.

She followed her child to the eternal rose garden (paradise).

And it was Asporça Sultan who joined that journey to the hereafter."

== Issue ==
By Orhan, she had two sons and two daughters:

- İbrahim Bey (1310-1362, buried in Osman I's türbe). Governor of Eskişehir, was executed by the order of his half-brother Sultan Murad I;
- Şerefullah Bey;
- Selçuk Hatun. She married Süleyman Bey, son of Mehmed Aydin;
- Fatma Hatun.Buried in her father's tomb in Bursa.

== In popular culture ==
In the 2025 Turkish historical fiction TV series Kuruluş: Orhan, Asporça Hatun was portrayed by Russian-Turkish actress Alina Boz.

== See also ==
- Ottoman Empire
- Ottoman dynasty

== Sources ==
- Peirce, Leslie P. (1993). The Imperial Harem: Women and Sovereignty in the Ottoman Empire (paperback ed.). Oxford University Press. ISBN 0-19-508677-5.
- Encyclopedia of Ahılık - Volume II. Şekerbank. 2017. pp. 190, 199
- Finkel, Caroline (2012-07-19). Osman's Dream. John Murray Press. ISBN 978-1-84854-785-8.
- Alderson, Anthony Dolphin (1956). The Structure of the Ottoman Dynasty. Clarendon Press.
- Hayrani, Altintaş (1981). "TASAVVUF" (PDF). Ankara Üniversitesi İlahiyat Fakültesi Dergisi (in Turkish). 24 (1): 1. doi:10.1501/Ilhfak_0000000622. ISSN 1301-0522.
- Önkal, Hakkı (1992). Osmanlı hanedan türbeleri. Kültür Bakanlığı yayınları. Ankara: Kültür Bakanlığı. ISBN 978-975-17-1009-3.
- Sakaoğlu, Necdet (2008). Bu mülkün kadın sultanları: vâlide sultanlar, hâtunlar, hasekiler, kadınefendiler, sultanefendiler (in Turkish). Oğlak Yayıncılık. ISBN 978-975-329-623-6.
- Tektaş, Nazım (2004). Harem'den taşanlar (in Turkish). Çatı Kitapları. ISBN 978-975-8845-02-6.
- Uluçay, M.C. (1980). Publications de la Société d'histoire turque: VII. sér (in Turkish). Türk Tarih Kurumu Basımevı.
- Kunt, Ibrahim Metin; Hassan, Ümit; Ödekan, Ayla, eds. (2009). Osmanlı Devleti: 1300 - 1600. Türkiye tarihi / Halil Berktay, [ve başkl.] (10. basım ed.). İstanbul: Cem Yayınevi. ISBN 978-975-406-564-0.
- "Osmanlı Tarihi" (PDF). Archived from the original (PDF) on 2017-05-07.
