= Mahassine Merabet =

Moroccan actress (born 1999)

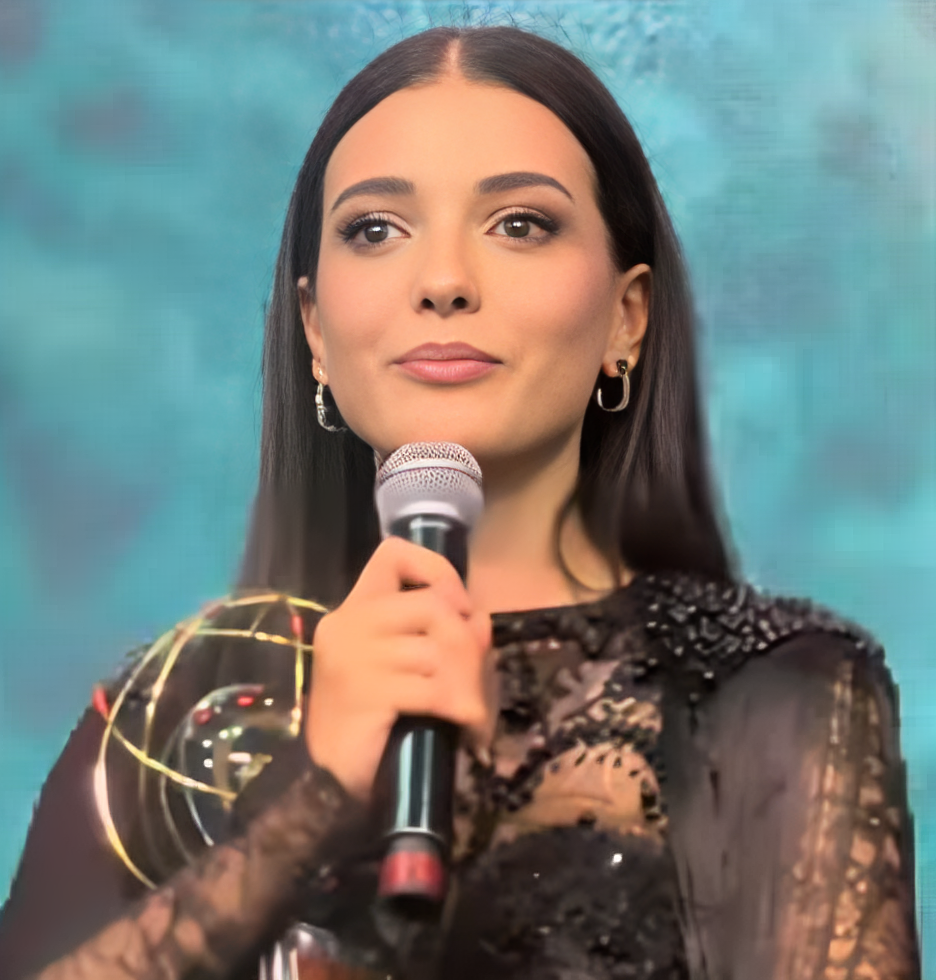
- Merabet in 2025
- Born: 24 January 1999 (age 27); Morocco
- Education: Mohammed V University; Nişantaşı University
- Occupation: Actress
- Years active: 2022–present

Mahassine Merabet (Arabic: محاسن المرابط; born 24 January 1999) is a Moroccan actress known for her role as Nilüfer Hatun in Turkish historical series Kuruluş: Orhan.

== Early life ==
Mahassine Marabet was born in Morocco on 24 January 1999. Having spent her childhood in Casablanca, she discovered her interest in art and communication at an early age. Having begun her education in Morocco, Marabet completed her bachelor's degree in Media and Communications from Mohammed V University before moving to Turkey to continue her career.

While continuing her studies in Turkey, she completed a master's degree in Political Science and International Relations at Nişantaşı University. Mahassine speaks Arabic, French, English, and Turkish.

== Filmography ==
=== Television ===
Year	Title	Role
2022–2025	Esaret	Hira Demirhanlı
2025–2026	Kuruluş: Orhan	Nilüfer Hatun

== Awards and nominations ==
Year	Awards	Category	Work	Result	Ref
2023	Golden Artemis Award at the International İzmir Film Festival	Best Actress (Drama Series)	Esaret	Nominated	
2024	Most Legends of the Year Awards	Actress of the Year (Best Drama Category)	Esaret	Won	
2025	MEV (Magazines & Entertainment Versatile) competition	Best Rising Actress of the Year	Esaret	Won	
2025	Moon Life Magazine Awards	Star Series Couple of the Year (shared with Cenk Torun)	Esaret	Won	
2025	Internet Media of the Year Awards	The Best Female Actress of the Year	Kuruluş: Orhan	Won	
2025	Moon Life Magazine Awards	Best Debut Female Actress	Kuruluş: Orhan	Won	
2025	11th Golden 61 Awards	Shining Star of the Year Female Actress	Kuruluş: Orhan	Won	
