= Şensoy =

Şensoy is a Turkish surname. Notable people with the surname include:

- Ferhan Şensoy, Turkish playwright, actor and stage director
- Hamdi Şensoy, Turkish architect
- Kemal Şensoy, Turkish politician
- Nabi Şensoy, Turkish diplomat
- Naci Şensoy, Turkish-Kosovar football manager
- Neşe Şensoy Yıldız, Turkish judoka
- Süleyman Şensoy, Turkish TASAM chairman
- Çağrı Şensoy, Turkish actor
