= Buse Arslan =

Turkish actress and model

- Born: 29 December 1992 (age 33); Istanbul, Turkey
- Education: Kadir Has University, Film and Drama Acting Department; Beykent University, Faculty of Fine Arts, Department of Acting
- Occupations: Actress, model
- Years active: 2011–present
- Spouses: Kazım Akdeniz (m. 2016; div. 2021) Çağrı Şensoy (m. 2023)
- Children: 1

Buse Arslan (born 29 December 1992) is a Turkish actress and model known for her role as 'Berrak Tezcan' in Kocaman Ailem (2018) and her role as 'Aygül Hatun' in Kuruluş: Osman (2019–).

== Biography ==
Buse Arslan was born on 29 December 1992 in Istanbul. She started her acting career for the first time in 2011 in the TV series Akasya Durağı. She played the character of "Berrak Tezcan" in My Kocaman Ailem, one of the series she played in 2018, and later, she played the role of "Aygül Hatun" in Kuruluş: Osman. The actress commented on Aygül being quick-witted and determined.

Graduated from Beykent University, Faculty of Fine Arts and Department of Acting, she afterward completed her master's degree in Kadir Has University Film and Drama Acting Department. She married the Turkish businessman Kazım Akdeniz in 2016 and divorced in 2021. In 2023, she married her Kuruluş: Osman co-star Çağrı Şensoy, with whom she has a daughter.

== Filmography ==
Film and television
Year	Title	Role	Notes
2011	Akasya Durağı		
2012	Avrupa Avrupa		
2012	Yalan Dünya		
2013	Benim Hala Umudum Var	Beril	
2013	Bizim Okul		
2014–2015	Kocamın Ailesi	Gülay	
2016	Kertenkele Yeniden Doğuş	Didem	
2016	Aşk Yalanı Sever	Perihan Aslan	
2017	Ateşböceği	Nevin	
2018	Kocaman Ailem	Berrak Tezcan	Leading role/ TV series
2019–2022	Kuruluş: Osman	Aygül Hatun	Supporting role/ TV series
