= Belgin Şimşek =

Turkish actress (born 1996)

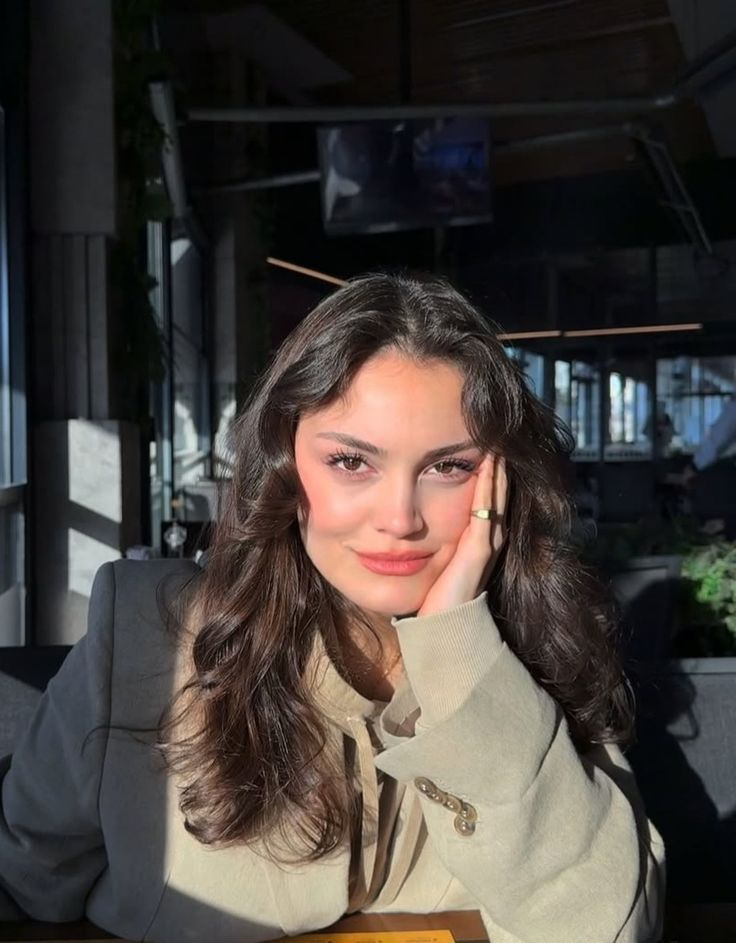
- Born: 10 December 1996 (age 29); Istanbul, Turkey
- Education: Sadri Alışık Cultural Center
- Occupation: Actress
- Years active: 2021–present

Belgin Şimşek (born 10 December 1996) is a Turkish actress known for her role as Gonca Hatun in the Turkish historical television series Kuruluş: Osman.

== Biography ==
Şimşek was born on 10 December 1996 in Istanbul, Turkey. She studied computer programming in high school, and went on to graduate in the field of Electroneurophysiology with honors. She later pursued a career in acting, completed her training and graduated from the Sadri Alisik Cultural Center. She landed her first role as Heves in the series Benim Hayatım on Star TV. She later joined the cast of the series Canım Annem in the role of Ela, which aired on TV8. Her breakthrough came with the role of Gonca Hatun, the daughter of Yakub I of Germiyan, in the popular Turkish historical fiction series Kuruluş: Osman, which aired on ATV. She later reprised her role as Gonca in the show's sequel Kuruluş: Orhan.

== Filmography ==
=== Television ===
Year	Title	Role	Reference
2021	Benim Hayatım	Heves	
2022	Yasak Elma	Guest appearance	
2022	Canım Annem	Ela	
2023	Dünya Bu	Buse	
2023–2025	Kuruluş: Osman	Gonca Hatun	
2025–2026	Kuruluş: Orhan	Gonca Hatun	
