= Ömer Faruk Aran =

Turkish actor (born 1995)

Faruk Aran
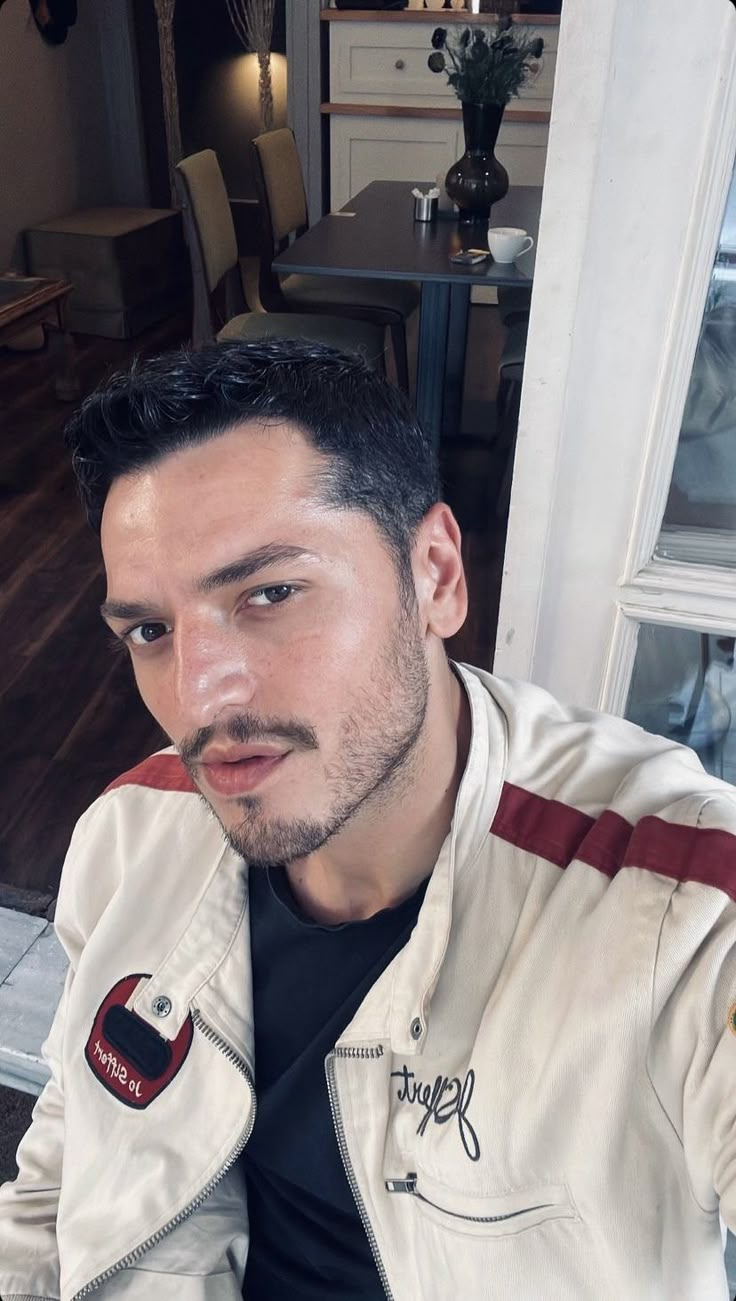
- Born: Ömer Faruk Aran; 23 March 1995 (age 31); İzmir, Turkey
- Education: Haliç University
- Occupation: Actor/Model
- Years active: 2018–present

Ömer Faruk Aran (born 23 March 1995) is a Turkish actor known for his role as Alaeddin Ali Bey in the Turkish historical television series Kuruluş: Osman and Kuruluş: Orhan.

== Biography ==
Aran was born in Karsiyaka, Izmir. He graduated from the Haliç University Conservatory Theatre Department. He also received on-camera acting training from Birce Akalay. He first appeared in minor roles in the TV series Leke, which aired on Kanal D, and later in the TV series Arka Sokaklar. In 2021, he took on the character Kalender in the TV series İşte Bu Benim Masalım and the role of Kuzu Beg in the TV series Destan, which aired on ATV. He went on to join the supporting cast of the series Al Sancak, which aired on TRT 1.

Aran's biggest breakthrough as of yet came with the ATV's historical fiction series Kuruluş: Osman, which he joined in 2023, in the role of Alaeddin Ali Pasha, the first vizier of the Ottoman Empire. He went on to win his first accolade for his role in Kuruluş: Osman, in the category of Best Supporting Actor at the 11th edition of the Golden 61 Awards (11. Altın 61 Ödülleri) held on November 25, 2025. He later reprised his role as the same in the show's sequel Kuruluş: Orhan.

== Filmography ==
=== Television ===
Year	Title	Role	Ref.
2021	İşte Bu Benim Masalım	Kalender	
2021–2022	Destan	Kuzu Beg	
2023	Al Sancak	Bora Cansız	
2023–2025	Kuruluş: Osman	Alaeddin Ali Bey	
2025–2026	Kuruluş: Orhan	Alaeddin Ali Bey	

== Awards and nominations ==
Year	Awards	Category	Work	Result	Ref.
2025	11th Golden 61 Awards (11. Altın 61 Ödülleri)	Best Supporting Actor of the Year	Kuruluş: Osman	Won	

== See also ==
- Turkish actors
