= Sheikh Edebali =

Sufi Sheikh and father-in-law of Osman Ghazi (d. 1326)

Personal life
- Born: c. 1206 Kırşehir, Rum Sultanate (now Turkey)
- Died: 1326 Bilecik, Ottoman Empire (now Turkey)
- Parent: İbrâhim bin İnaç el-Kırşehrî (father)
- Known for: Sufism
- Relations: Ildiz Hatun (wife); Rabia Bala Hatun (daughter)

Religious life
- Religion: Islam
- Denomination: Sunni
- School: Hanafi
- Creed: Maturidi

Muslim leader
- Period in office: 13th and 14th century
- Influenced by: Mevlânâ Jalāl ad-Dīn Muhammad Rūmī, Sadr al-Din al-Qunawi

İmâdüddin Mustafa bin İbrâhim bin İnâc el-Kırşehrî (died in 1326), often known as Sheikh Edebali (Turkish: Şeyh Edebali), was a Turkish Muslim Sheikh of the Wafaiyya order (tariqa) and leader of the Ahi brotherhood, who helped shape and develop the policies of the growing Ottoman State. He was assigned as the first Qadi of the Ottoman Empire. Edebali was the father of Rabia Bala Hatun, who married Osman Gazi, the founder of the Ottoman Empire.

== Interaction with Ottoman leaders ==
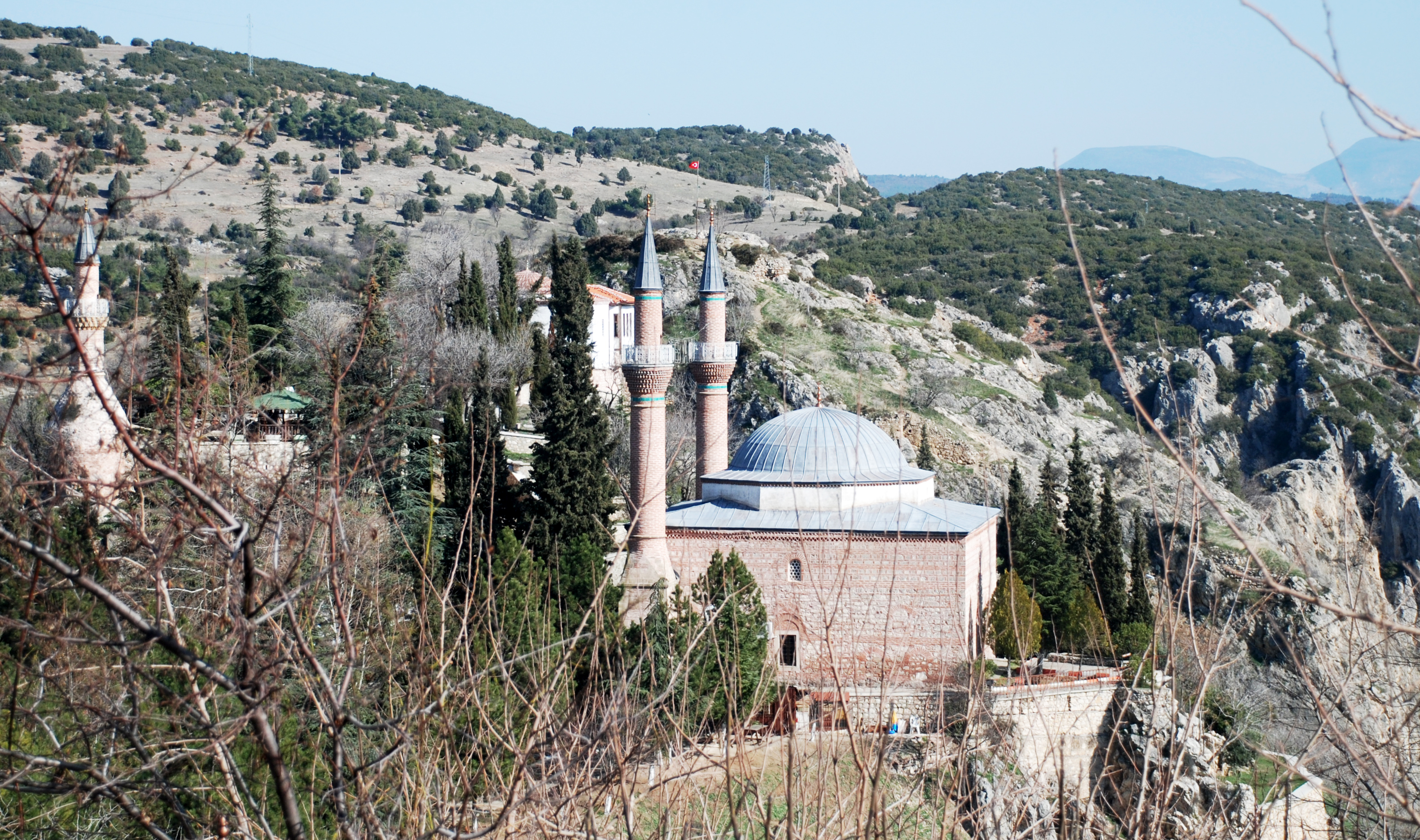
Tomb of Sheikh Edebali in Bilecik

Sheikh Edebali often conversed with his close friend Ertuğrul Gazi, the father of Osman Gazi about Islam and the state of affairs of Muslims in Anatolia. Osman had been a frequent guest of Edebali. Edebali became Osman's mentor and eventually gifted him a Gazi sword. At Edebali's dergah, Osman dreamed of a state. This dream thus led to the establishment of a state. After this, Edebali's daughter Bala Hatun was married to Osman. As a result of this marriage, all the Ahyan sheikhs came under Ottoman control. The Ayhan - frequently associated with the Ahi guilds of craftsmen, farmers, and ghazi warriors - provided organized manpower, logistical backing, and regional influence. This had a major impact on the establishment and development of the Ottoman Beylik.

== Tribe ==
Sheikh Edebali belonged to the Banu Tamim tribe, one of the well-known Arab tribes that later settled in Anatolia. Members of this tribe were historically influential in religious, scholarly, and political spheres across the Islamic world.

== In popular culture ==
Sheikh Edebali has been portrayed in the Turkish historical fiction series; Kuruluş Osmancık (1988) by Turkish actor Haluk Kurtoğlu, and in the historical fiction series Kuruluş: Osman by Turkish actor Seda Yıldız.

== See also ==
- Osman's Dream
- Foundation of the Ottoman Empire
