= Emre Bey =

Turkish actor (born 1997)

- Born: 28 February 1997 (age 29) Istanbul, Turkey
- Occupation: Actor
- Years active: 2015–present
- Known for: Kuruluş: Osman

Emre Bey (born 28 February 1997) is a Turkish actor, known for his role as Orhan Bey, in the history-based, adventure series Kuruluş: Osman.

== Career ==
Emre Bey was born on 28 February 1997 in Istanbul. Emre Bey is of Albanian descent on his father's side and has roots in Bursa on his mother's side. The dream of the player, who played licensed football as a child, was to become a football player. The actor, who signed up to the agency with the guidance of an acquaintance while he was in high school, started his acting career from there. Later, he received acting training at the Craft acting workshop. He started his acting career with the TV series Ask Zamani in 2015, while he was continuing his high school education. After receiving acting training from a private workshop, he played the character of Kıvanç in the TV series Adı Efsane in 2016, while he was a university student. After appearing in the TV series Elimi Bırakma in 2018, he last played the character of Burak in the TV series Sol Yanım in 2020. He portrayed the character of young Orhan Bey in the historical fiction series Kurulus: Osman for two seasons.

== Filmography ==
Television
Year	Production	Role	Notes
2014	Arka Sokaklar	Tarık (342. Bölüm)	
2014	Şehrin Melekleri		Understudy
2015	Aşk Zamanı	Can	Understudy
2017	Adı Efsane	Kıvanç	Understudy
2018–2019	Elimi Bırakma	Arda Çelen	Understudy
2020–2021	Sol Yanım	Burak Egemen	Headliner
2021	Menajerimi Ara	Kendisi	guest star
2022	Son Nefesime Kadar	Ejder Sarıoğlu	Understudy
2022–2023	Balkan Ninnisi	Ertan Tahir	Headliner
2023	Vermem Seni Ellere	Mehmet	Headliner
2023–2025	Kuruluş Osman	Orhan Gazi	Headliner
2025-2026	Rüya Gibi	Efe	Headliner
Internet
Year	Production	Role	Notes
2021	Yetiş Zeynep	Kutay	Understudy
2023	Akif	Haluk	Understudy
Cinema
Year	Production	Role	Notes
2022	Mahalleden Arkadaşlar	Güney	Understudy
2025	Kıbrıs Türküsü	Ali	Headliner
