= Istanbul Nişantaşı University =

Private university in İstanbul, Turkey

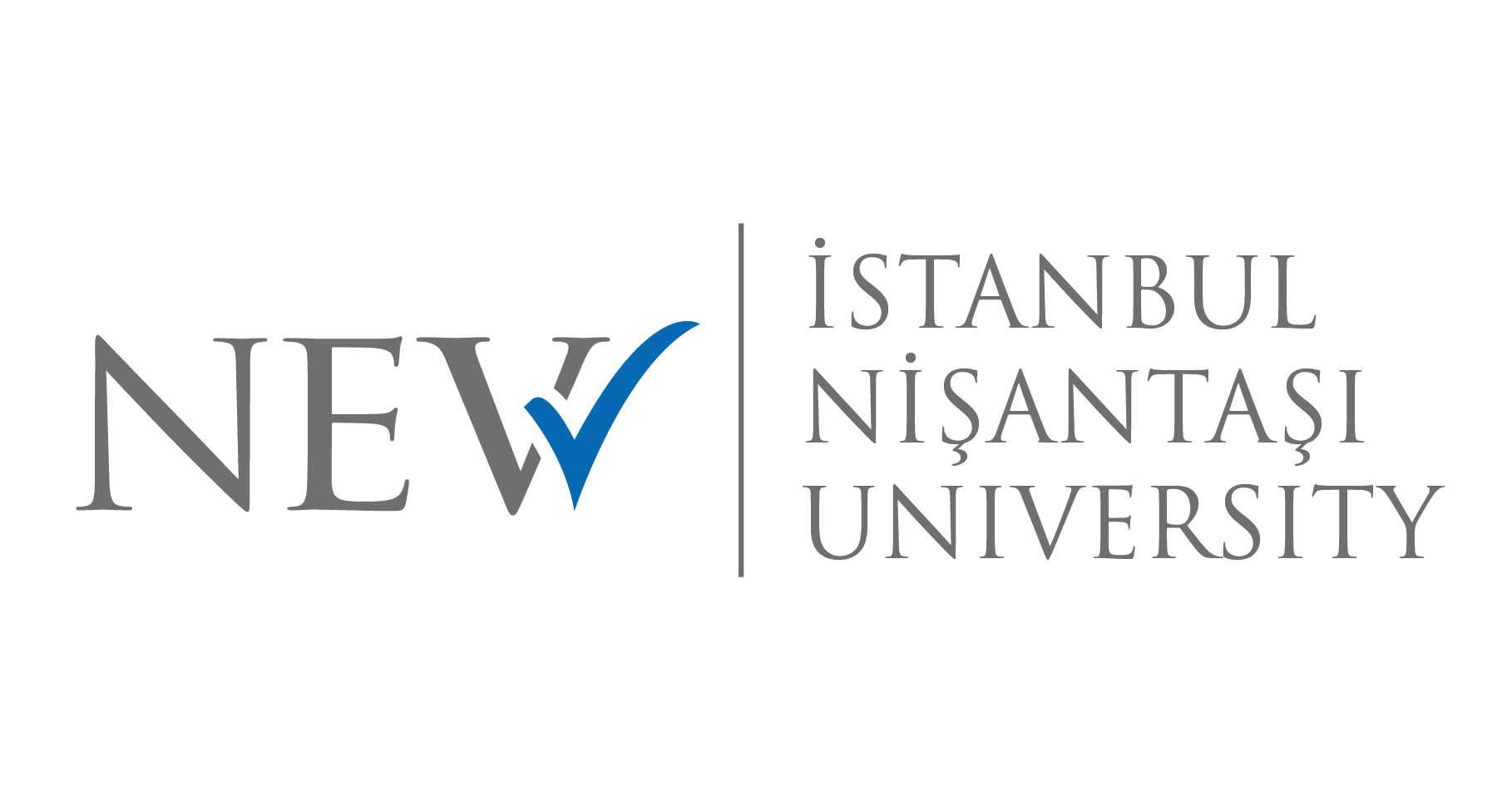
- Type: Foundation
- Established: 2012
- President: Levent Uysal
- Rector: Şenay Yalçın
- Location: Istanbul, Turkey; 41°02′22″N 28°54′44″E
- Campus: Bayrampaşa, Kağıthane, Nişantaşı
- Founder: Nişantaşı Education and Culture Foundation

Istanbul Nişantaşı University (Turkish: İstanbul Nişantaşı Üniversitesi) is a private, non-profit educational institution, founded in 2012 and located in Istanbul, Turkey. The university is supported financially by the Nişantaşı Education and Culture Foundation. It started education in the academic term 2010-11.

== Structure ==
=== Faculties ===
==== Faculty of Medicine ====
- Medicine

==== Faculty of Dentistry ====
- Dentistry

Faculty of Economics, Administration and Social Science

- Civil Air Transport Management
- Psychology
- International Trade and Logistics
- Health Management
- Social Work
- Economics and Finance
- Political Science and Public Administration
- Economy
- Banking and Finance
- International Relations
- Business Administration
- Accounting and Financial Management
- Psychology (in English)
- New Media
- New Media (in English)
- Journalism
- Public Relations and Advertising
- Sociology
- Tourism Management
- Management Information Systems

Faculty of Engineering and Architecture

- Civil Engineering
- Architecture
- Software Engineering
- Computer Engineering
- Industrial Engineering
- Mechanical Engineering
- AI engineering

Faculty of Arts and Design

- Textile and Fashion Design
- Interior Architecture
- Communication Design
- Radio, Television and Film
- Gastronomy and Culinary Arts
- Graphic Design

Nişantaşı University Vocational School

== Campus ==
- Kağıthane Sadabad Campus in Kağıthane
- Bayrampaşa Campus in Bayrampaşa
- Nişantaşı Campus in Nişantaşı
