= Çağrı Şensoy =

Turkish actor (born 1986)

- Born: 17 April 1986 (age 40); Istanbul, Turkey
- Education: Istanbul University, State Conservatory Acting Department; Kadir Has University, Film and Drama Department
- Occupation: Actor
- Years active: 2008–present
- Spouse: Buse Arslan (m. 2023)
- Children: 1

Çağrı Şensoy (born 17 April 1986) is a Turkish actor known for his roles as Deli Hüseyin Pasha in Muhteşem Yüzyıl: Kösem, as Cerkutay in Kuruluş: Osman and Kuruluş: Orhan and as Kürşat Teğmen in Savaşçı.

== Biography ==
Şensoy was born on 17 April 1986 in Istanbul. He completed his high school education in Pera Fine Arts High School where he studied theater between 2000 and 2004, then he completed his higher education at Istanbul University State Conservatory Acting Department and continued his graduate education at Kadir Has University Film and Drama Department.

Between 2002 and 2012, he also appeared in many theatre plays and later appeared in many popular TV series including Muhteşem Yüzyıl: Kösem, where he played the role of Deli Hüseyin Paşa and in Kuruluş: Osman, where he appeared as Cerkutay.

== Filmography ==
Film
Year	Title	Role
2013	Meddah	
Television
2008	Ölüm Çiçekleri	Çentik Duvar
2010	Çakıl Taşları	Doğan
2011	Mazi Kalbimde Yaradır	Necati
2014	Günahkar	Gökhan
2014	Aşkın Kanunu	Ali
2016	Muhteşem Yüzyıl: Kösem	Deli Hüseyin Paşa
2017	Savaşçı	Kürşat Teğmen
2020–2025	Kuruluş: Osman	Cerkutay
2025	Kuruluş: Orhan	Cerkutay bey
