= Süleyman Pasha (son of Orhan) =

Ottoman prince (1316–1359)

- Gazi
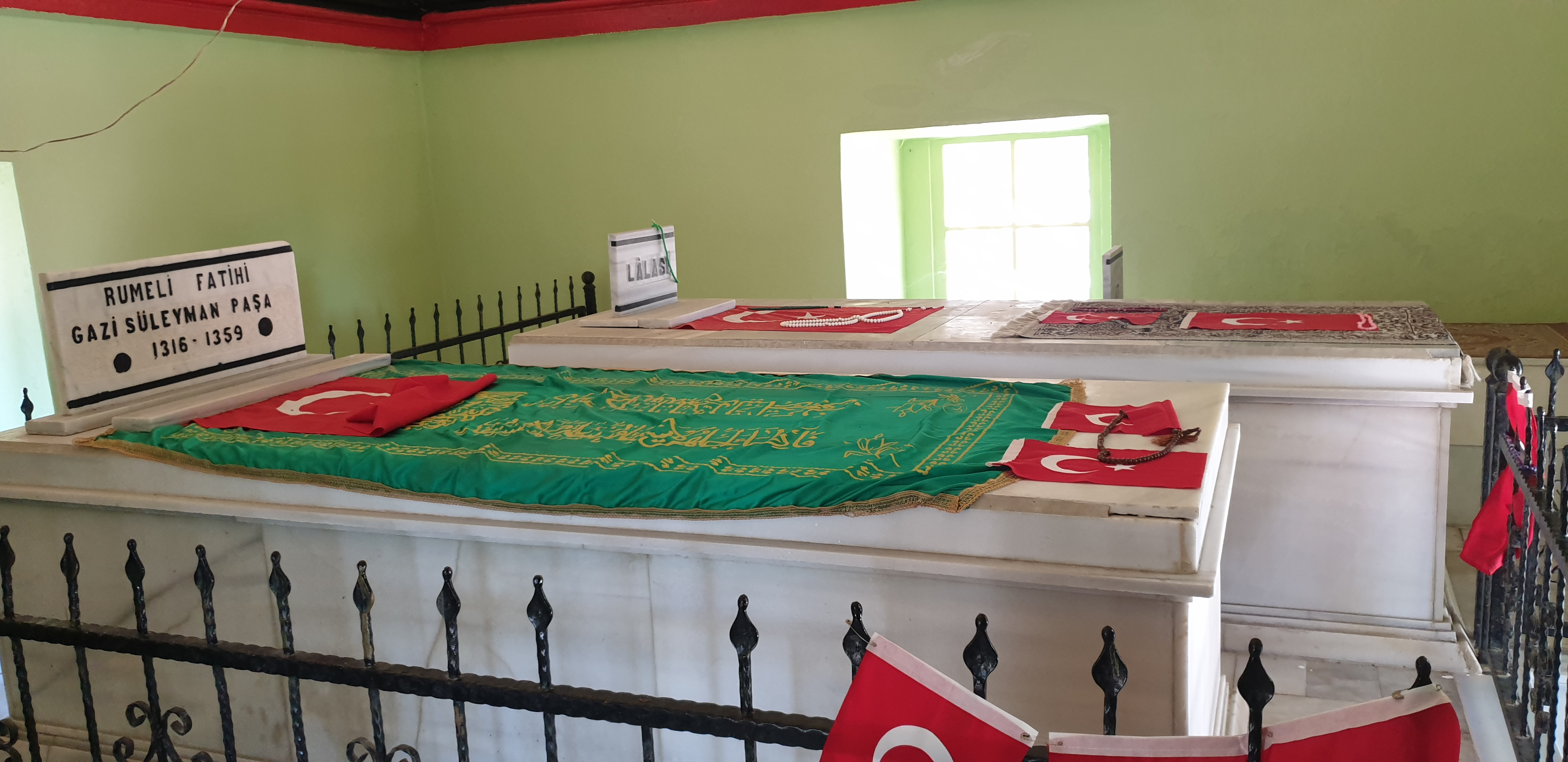
- Süleyman's türbe
- Born: c.1306
- Died: 1357 (aged 50–51); Bolayır
- Burial: Süleyman Pasha's türbe, Bolayır
- Consorts: Selçuk Hatun; Gülbahar Hatun
- Issue: Ishak Bey; Nasir Melik Bey; Ismail Bey; Efendize Hatun; Fülane Sultan Hatun
- House: House of Osman
- Father: Orhan
- Religion: Sunni Islam

Süleyman Pasha (c. 1306 – 1357) was an Ottoman prince and the son of Sultan Orhan.

He played a major role in early Ottoman expansion into Thrace in the 1350s. He was Orhan's eldest son and, until his death due to a hunting accident, his heir presumptive.

== Motherhood ==
Traditional Ottoman historiography wrote that Süleyman Pasha's mother was Nilüfer Hatun, who was also the mother of Murad I. This has been refuted by modern historiography:Süleyman's mother was actually the consort Efendize Hatun, while Nilüfer entered the harem in 1325, twenty years after Süleyman's birth. Efendize was Orhan's cousin, the daughter of his uncle Gündüz Bey.

== Biography ==
For his achievements as a warrior, Süleyman Pasha was given the title Ghazi.

He was one of Orhan's main generals, especially in Thrace, and became known as the "Conqueror of Rumelia".

He conquered Iznik (Nicaea) in 1331, Karesioğulları in 1335, and Izmit (Nicomedia) in 1337. His father appointed him governor of all his conquests. Between 1349 and 1354 he conquered Gallipoli and its region. He failed in the siege of Sofia, but he killed its governor Ivan Asen, son of tsar Ivan Alexander.

In 1355 he crossed the Dardanelles and conquered parts of Rumelia, where he created a nucleus of Ottoman settlements, including Bulair (Bolayır), Rodosto (Tekirdağ), Ipsala, and Malgara (Malkara), which were then exploited as a base for future conquests. In the same year, he killed a second son of Ivan Alexander, Michael.

He died in 1357, due to a fall from his horse while hunting with falcon between Bolayır and Seydikavağı. His father had him buried in Bolayır, even though Süleyman had already had a mausoleum built in Yenişehir, near Bursa.

He is also remembered for his religious and charitable constructions in the territories he administered: he built mosques, madrasas, caravanserais and schools in Bursa, Göynük, Geyve, Akyazı, İzmit, İznik and Gelibolu.

== Family ==
=== Consorts ===
Süleyman Pasha had two known consorts:

- Selçuk Hatun, daughter of Seyyid Hüseyin Çelebi.
- Gülbahar Hatun, daughter of Kötürüm Bayezid

=== Sons ===
Süleyman Pasha had at least three sons:

- Ishak Bey, Rumelia's bey.
- Melik Nasir Bey. According to traditional accounts, he drowned in the sea near Bolayır. However, some historians claim that he was executed by his uncle, Sultan Murad, in 1365.
- Ismail Bey, Rumelia's bey. He was the leader of the Ottoman raiders in Rumelia.

=== Daughters ===
Süleyman Pasha had at least two daughters:

- Efendize Hatun (died in July 1397, buried in Akşehir, Imaret Cami's cemetery).
- Fülane Sultan Hatun (died in 1395, buried at Sinop), married Candaroğlu Süleyman Pasha, brother of Gülbahar Hatun, and was mother of Mubariz al-Din Isfendiyar Bey. She had also a daughter who married Murad I, Süleyman's younger brother.

== Bibliography ==
- Alderson, Anthony Dolphin (1956). The Structure of the Ottoman Dynasty. Clarendon Press.
- Finkel, Caroline (2005). Osman's Dream: The Story of the Ottoman Empire, 1300-1923. Basic Books. ISBN 978-0-465-02396-7.
- Imber, Colin (2009). The Ottoman Empire, 1300-1650: The Structure of Power (2 ed.). New York: Palgrave Macmillan. ISBN 978-0-230-57451-9.
- Kafadar, Cemal (1995). Between Two Worlds: The Construction of the Ottoman State. University of California Press. ISBN 978-0-520-20600-7.
- Lowry, Heath (2003). The Nature of the Early Ottoman State. SUNY Press. ISBN 0-7914-5636-6.
