= Mouzalon =

Mouzalon or Muzalon (Greek: Μουζάλων, pl. Μουζάλωνες) was the name of a Byzantine family attested in the 11th through 15th centuries, which produced a number of officials and high dignitaries. The family reached its peak in the 1250s, when it enjoyed the patronage of Emperor Theodore II Laskaris (r. 1254–1258), but was largely purged after his death by the great aristocratic families. The female form of the name is Mouzalonissa (Μουζαλώνισσα).

== History and members ==
The first known members of the family are attested in 11th-century seals. One of them records Theophano Mouzalonissa, "archontissa of Rhousia". It has been suggested that she was the wife of Oleg Svyatoslavovich, lord of Tmutarakan, but it is also possible that she was simply the wife of the Byzantine archon of the port city and base of Rhosia, which was located near Tmutarakan. In the late 11th century, Nicholas Mouzalon, became Archbishop of Cyprus and later, in 1147–1151, Patriarch of Constantinople. Another member of the family, Constantine Mouzalon, was a patriarchal notary.

The most prominent members of the family however were the Mouzalon brothers from Adramyttium. They entered palace service as pages to the young Theodore II Laskaris, and became his childhood companions. Although they were of humble origin, upon his accession Theodore rewarded them with the highest state offices. His close friend George Mouzalon was made first megas domestikos (commander in chief of the army) and then protovestiarios (chamberlain) and megas stratopedarches, an office specially created for him. Andronikos was made protovestiarios and then succeeded George as megas domestikos, while Theodore, the eldest brother, was made protokynegos (chief huntsman). This unprecedented favour towards low-born men, as well as their subsequent marriage, on the emperor's initiative, to women of prominent noble families, aroused the enmity of the traditional aristocracy. Theodore II died in August 1258 after a short illness, leaving George Mouzalon as regent for the young John IV Laskaris (r. 1258–1261). A few days after his death however, an aristocratic conspiracy led by the future emperor Michael VIII Palaiologos (r. 1259–1282) arranged their murder by mutinous soldiers during a memorial service for the deceased emperor. There were also at least two sisters, one of whom was married to a Hagiotheodorites. The name of the other husband is unknown, but he too was murdered along with his brothers-in-law. Other contemporary members of the family, of uncertain relation to the four brothers, included a governor of the capital of Nicaea, whose first name is unknown, and the mystikos and epi tou kanikleiou John Mouzalon.

A Theodore Mouzalon appears later as logothetes tou genikou to Michael VIII. It has been suggested that he is the elder of the murdered brothers, but it is not certain. After disagreeing with the emperor's unionist religious policies, he was dismissed and flogged, but returned to favour under Andronikos II Palaiologos (r. 1282–1328). His daughter Eudokia married Constantine Palaiologos, the emperor's second son. Under Andronikos II, the family also regained military offices: Stephen Mouzalon was megas droungarios tou ploimou and led the negotiations with the Catalan Company, while the hetaireiarches George Mouzalon led the Byzantine forces in the Battle of Bapheus against the Ottomans in 1302.

The aristocrat John Mouzalon is mentioned later in the century, while the last known member of the family is the "philosopher physician" Demetrios Mouzalon in the 15th century.

== Sources ==
- Kazhdan, Alexander, ed. (1991), Oxford Dictionary of Byzantium, Oxford University Press, p. 1771, ISBN 978-0-19-504652-6
- Macrides, Ruth (2007), George Akropolites: The History - Introduction, translation and commentary, Oxford University Press, ISBN 978-0-19-921067-1
- Makripoulias, Christos (2005). "Mouzalon Family". Encyclopedia of the Hellenic World, Asia Minor.
