= Sword of Osman =

Sword of state used during the enthronement ceremony of the Ottoman sultans

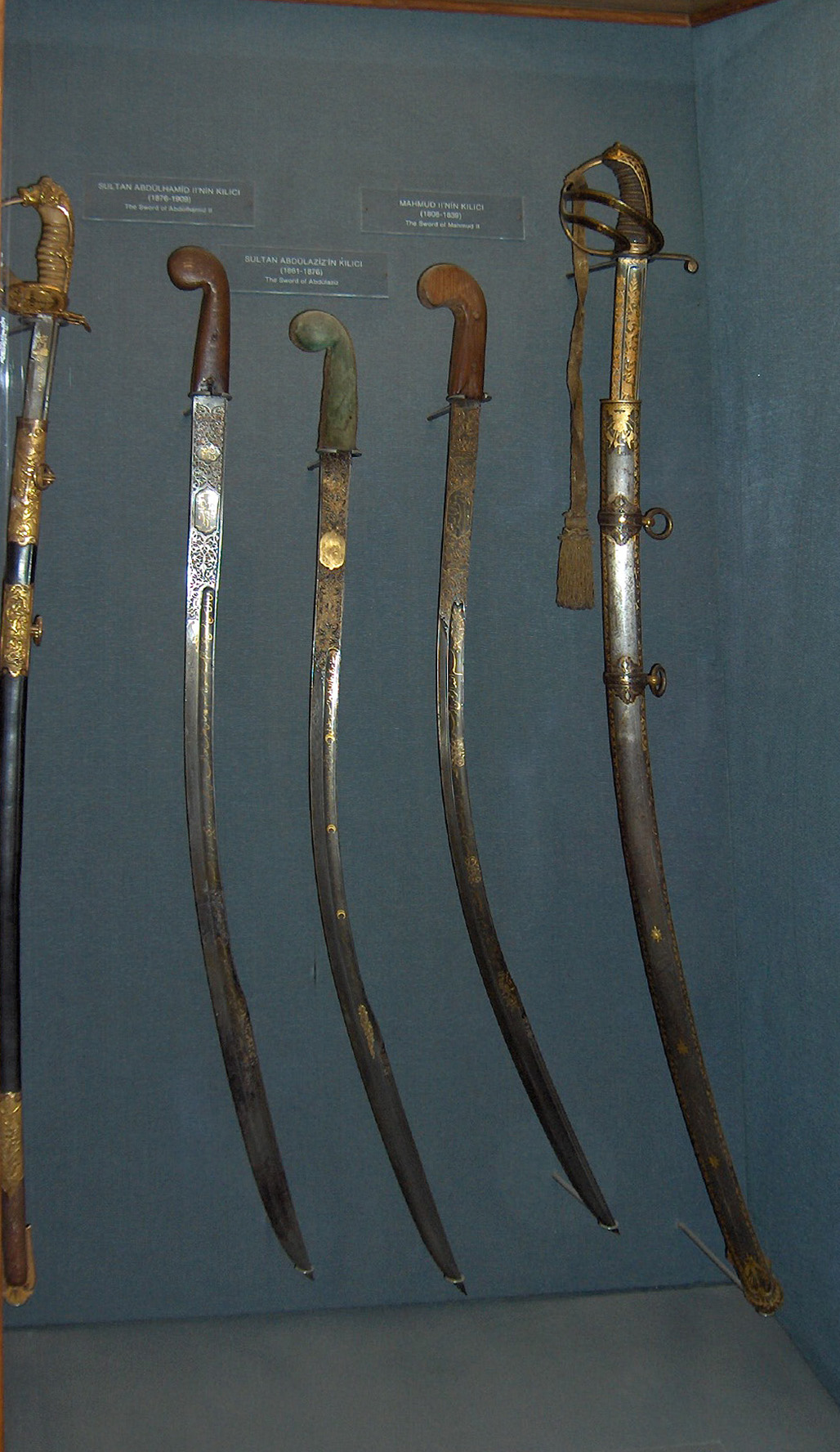
Example photograph showing the swords of several Ottoman sultans in the Topkapı Palace, Istanbul, Türkiye, 2007

The Sword of Osman (Ottoman Turkish: تقلیدِ سیف; Turkish: Osman'ın Kılıcı) is an important sword of state that was used during the enthronement ceremony (Turkish: Kılıç alayı) of the sultans of the Ottoman Empire, from the accession of Murad II onwards. This particular type of enthronement ceremony was the Ottoman variant of the Bay'ah. The sword was named after Osman I, founder of the Ottoman dynasty.

== History ==
The girding of the Sword of Osman was a vital ceremony and took place within two weeks of a sultan's ascension to the throne. The practice started when Osman I was girt with the sword of Islam by his mentor and father-in-law Sheikh Edebali. The girding was held at the tomb complex at Eyüp, on the Golden Horn waterway in the capital Constantinople. Even though the journey from Topkapı Palace (where the sultan resided) to the Golden Horn was short, the sultan would board a boat amid much pomp to go there. The Eyüp tomb complex was built by Mehmed II in honour of Abu Ayyub al-Ansari, a companion of Muhammad who had died during the first Muslim Siege of Constantinople in the 7th century. The sword girding thus occurred on what was regarded as sacred grounds and linked the newly-enthroned sultan to his 13th-century ancestors and to Muhammad himself.

The fact that the emblem by which a sultan was enthroned consisted of a sword was highly symbolic. It showed that the office with which he was invested was first and foremost that of a warrior. The Sword of Osman was girded on to the new sultan by the Sharif of Konya, a Mevlevi dervish, who was summoned to Constantinople for that purpose. Such a privilege was reserved to the men of this Sufi order from the time Osman I had established his residence in Sögüt in 1299, before the capital was moved to Bursa and later to Constantinople.

Until the late 19th century, non-Muslims were banned from entering the Eyüp Mosque and witnessing the girding ceremony. The first to depart from that tradition was Mehmed V, whose girding ceremony was open to people of different faiths. Held on 10 May 1909, it was attended by representatives of all the religious communities present in the empire, notably the Sheikh ul-Islam, the Ecumenical Patriarch of Constantinople, the chief rabbi (Hakham Bashi) and a representative of the Armenian Apostolic Church. The fact that non-Muslims were allowed to see the ceremony enabled The New York Times to write an extremely detailed account of it. Mehmed V's brother and successor, Mehmed VI, whose girding ceremony was held on 4 July 1918, went even further by allowing the ceremony to be filmed. Since he was the last reigning Ottoman sultan, that is the only such ceremony that was ever put on film. The Sword of Osman is held in the Imperial Treasury section of Topkapı Palace.

== Bibliography ==
- Bagley, Frank R. C. (1969). The Last Great Muslim Empires. Leiden: BRILL. ISBN 978-90-04-02104-4. OCLC 310742207.
- Hasluck, Frederick William (2007) [First published 1929]. "XLVI. The Girding of the Sultan". In Hasluck, Margaret (ed.). Christianity and Islam Under the Sultans. Vol. II. READ BOOKS. pp. 604–622. ISBN 978-1-4067-5887-0.
- Quataert, Donald (2005). The Ottoman Empire, 1700–1922 (2nd ed.). Cambridge University Press. ISBN 978-0-521-83910-5. OCLC 59280221.
