= Ottoman family tree (simplified) =

Royal family tree of the Ottoman Empire

Osman I ?- c. 1300-1323/4
Orhan c. 1284-1362; 1323/4-1362
Murad I 1326-1389; 1362-1389
Bayezid I 1357-1403; 1389-1403
Mehmed I 1387-1421; 1413-1421
Murad II; 1404-1451 r. 1421-44, 1446-51
Mehmed II; 1432-1481 r. 1444-46, 1451-81
Bayezid II; 1448-1512; 1481-1512
Selim I 1466- 1512-1520
Suleiman I 1494-1520-1566
Selim II; 1524- 1566-1574
Murad III; 1546- 1574-1595
Mehmed III; 1566- 1595-1603
Ahmed I 1590- 1603-1617 | Mustafa I 1600-1639 r. 1617-18, 1622-23
Osman II; 1604-1618-1622 | Murad IV; 1612-1623-1640 | Ibrahim; 1615-1640-1648
Mehmed IV; 1642-1693 r. 1648-1687 | Suleiman II; 1642- 1687-1691 | Ahmed II; 1643- 1691-1695
Mustafa II; 1664- 1695-1703 | Ahmed III; 1673-1736 r. 1703-1730
Mahmud I 1696- 1730-1754 | Osman III; 1699- 1754-1757 | Mustafa III; 1717- 1757-1774 | Abdul Hamid I 1725- 1774-1789
Selim III; 1761-1808 r. 1789-1807 | Mustafa IV; 1779- 1807-1808 | Mahmud II; 1785- 1808-1839
Abdulmejid I 1823- 1839-1861 | Abdulaziz; 1830- 1861-1876
Murad V 1840-1904 r. 1876 | Abdul Hamid II; 1842-1918 r. 1876-1909 | Mehmed V 1844- 1909-1918 | Mehmed VI; 1861-1926 r. 1918-1922

== See also ==
- Detailed Ottoman family tree

== Bibliography ==
- Montgomery-Massingberd, Hugh, ed. (1980). "The Imperial Family of Turkey". Burke's Royal Families of the World. Vol. II: Africa & the Middle East. London: Burke's Peerage. pp. 237–248. ISBN 978-0-85011-029-6. OCLC 18496936.
- Bernard Lewis, The Emergence of Modern Turkey (Studies in Middle Eastern History), Publisher: Oxford University Press, USA; 3rd edition (September 6, 2001); Paperback: 568 pages; ISBN 0-19-513460-5; ISBN 978-0-19-513460-5
