= Ahis =

14th century Anatolian beylik

Map of Anatolia in the early 14th century

The Ahi Brotherhood (Turkish: Ahî, pl. Ahîler), referred to as Ahi Republic in modern historiography, was a brotherhood union by Ahi Evran in Anatolia (around present-day Ankara) in the 13th and 14th centuries.

== Etymology ==
The traditional explanation for the name "Ahi" is that it is the Turkish pronunciation of the Arabic word "akhi", meaning "my brother". Another possibility is from an early Turkish word aqi, recorded in Mahmud al-Kashgari's 11th century Turkish dictionary Dīwān Lughāt al-Turk as meaning "generous, courageous, virtuous". A progression from aqi to akhi to ahi is "entirely consistent with the phonetic development of Anatolian Turkish".

== Background ==
Turkic people began settling in Anatolia in the second half of the 11th century. But they mainly preferred rural areas. Seljuk government on the other hand encouraged those who preferred a settled life in cities. After the Mongols began occupying Khorosan in the early 13th century, people from Khorasan took refuge in Anatolia and the Seljuk government settled some of the newcomers in the cities. So a class of Muslim craftsmen and merchants appeared in the history of Anatolia.

== Emergence of Ahis ==
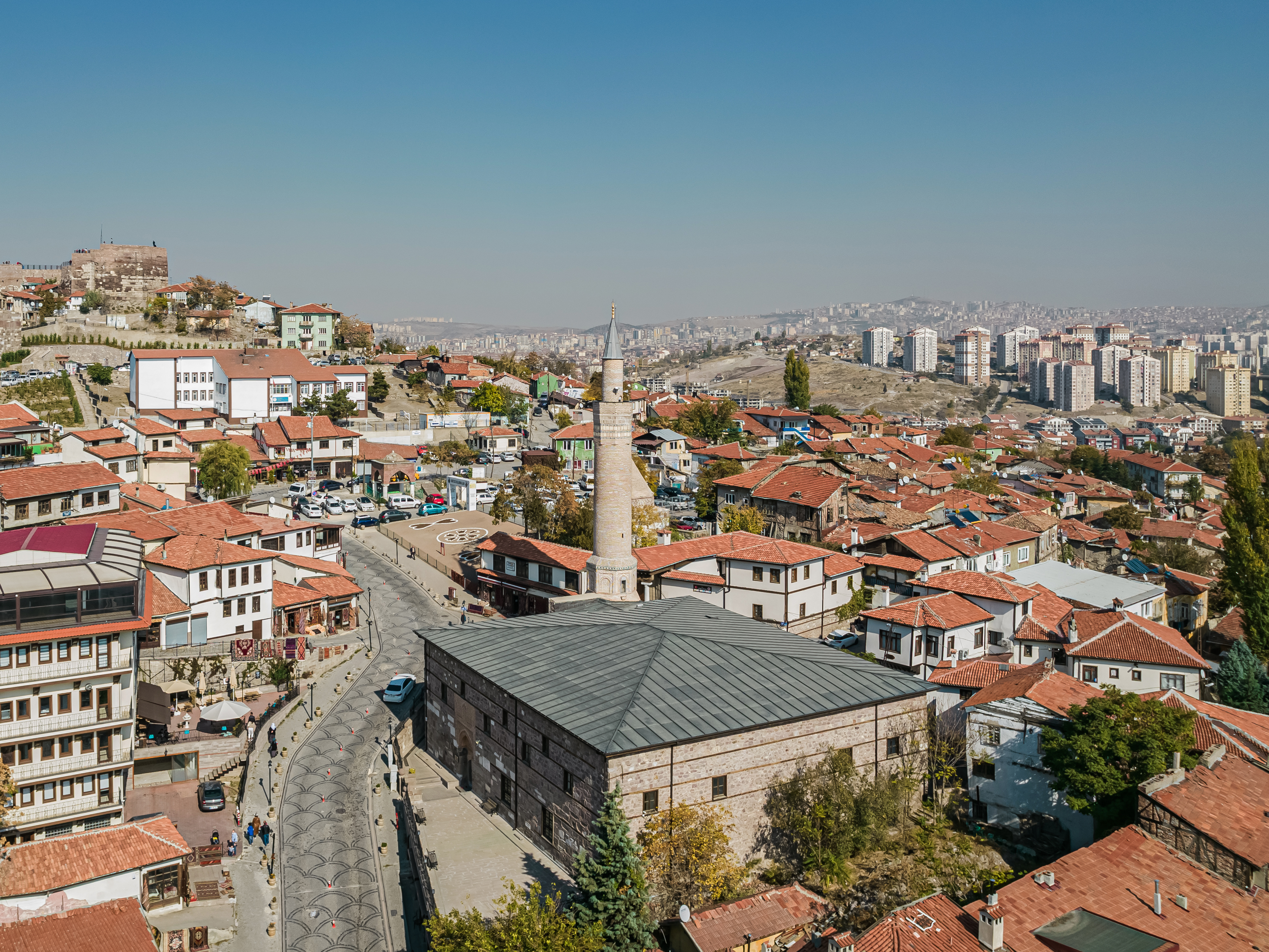
Aerial view of Aslanhane Mosque - one of the oldest in Türkiye - next to Ankara Castle

Ahi Evren, a Muslim preacher came to Anatolia before the Mongol invasions in Khorasan. He worked as a leather dealer in Kayseri and began organizing Muslim craftsmen in the cities. This organization was named after him. He moved to Konya and after Mongol invasions to Denizli and Kırşehir where he died.

== Ahi as a political power ==
After the Battle of Kösedağ in 1243, the Seljuks came under the influence of the Ilkhanate Mongols, and during the power vacuum in Anatolia, various tribes or local warlords established their principalities as vassals of Ilkhanids. Ahis in Ankara also saw their chance to declare their semi-independence under Mongol suzerainty towards the end of the century (about 1290). However, Ahi Beylik, unlike the others, was not ruled by a dynasty. It was a religious and commercial fraternity which can be described as a republic not much different from the mercantile republics of the medieval Europe.

== End of Ahi Beylik ==
In 1354, Ankara was briefly annexed by Orhan of Ottoman Empire (then known as beylik). Although Ahis tried to restore their independence after Orhan's death, in 1362 Murad I ended the political power of Ahis and they became the part of Ottoman Empire. In later years, some Ahi leaders even appeared as Ottoman bureaucrats.

== Practices ==
External videos
- Theatrical re-enactment of an Ahi initiation ceremony.
- https://www.youtube.com/watch?v=NvMrDQbM9r0

Besides being a religious order, the Ahis also functioned as a fraternity and often promoted studies of knowledge, wisdom and insight. It preached fraternity and solidarity amongst the members, and aimed creating a society of virtue throughout a shared philosophy. It also supported and developed the people in the regions under its control through providing a basis of organisation and establishing charities. Given its function, influence and scope, it is clear that Akhism is not purely commercial. Ahis expected members to be initiated through a process of selection and afterwards they practiced an initiation ceremony named "şed kuşanma töreni" (rite of wearing an apron) in which the candidate had to take an oath and wear a piece of cloth to symbolize he had been accepted into the fraternity. The members are expected to join secret and open rites named "toy" (wedding and banquet),"şenlik" (festival), "kutlama" (celebration) and "tören" (procession) which worked to instill discipline amongst the members, permit fun activity amongst the community and promote the unity of the community by sharing food items. Ahis were organised under jurisdiction of sheikhs who held the title "ahibaba", stores and workshops would act as gathering and education centres for newly initiated apprentice, this provided an invisible network of education and secret fraternal unity that sprawled throughout villages. Ahis had a three-fold rank system within their order, the "yiğit" (warrior, non-initiated candidates who have to prove themselves worthy), the "çırak" (apprentice), "kalfa" (journeyman) and "usta" (master craftsman), modern-day Turkish guilds still imitate the rank system of the Ahis and trace their traditions to it.

== See also ==
- Akhiya
