= Tekfur =

Title given to a minor Byzantine ruler

Tekfur (Ottoman Turkish: تكفور, romanized: Tekfur) was a title used in the late Seljuk and early Ottoman periods to refer to independent or semi-independent minor Christian rulers or local Byzantine governors in Asia Minor and Thrace.

== Origin and meaning ==
The origin of the title is uncertain. It has been suggested that it derives from the Byzantine imperial name Nikephoros, via Arabic Nikfor. It is sometimes also said that it derives from the Armenian takavor, "king". The term and its variants (tekvur, tekur, tekir, etc.) began to be used by historians writing in Persian or Turkish in the 13th century, to refer to "denote Byzantine lords or governors of towns and fortresses in Anatolia (Bithynia, Pontus) and Thrace. It often denoted Byzantine frontier warfare leaders, commanders of akritai, but also Byzantine princes and emperors themselves", e.g. in the case of the Tekfur Sarayı, the Turkish name of the Palace of the Porphyrogenitus in Constantinople (mod. Istanbul).

Thus the 13th-century Seljuk historian Ibn Bibi refers to the Armenian kings of Cilicia as tekvur, while both he and the Dede Korkut epic refer to the rulers of the Empire of Trebizond as "tekvur of Djanit". In the early Ottoman period, the term was used for both the Byzantine governors of fortresses and towns, with whom the Turks fought during the Ottoman expansion in northwestern Anatolia and in Thrace, but also for the Byzantine emperors themselves, interchangeably with malik ("king") and more rarely, fasiliyus (a rendering of the Byzantine title basileus). Modern historian Hasan Çolak suggests that this use was at least in part a deliberate choice, to reflect current political realities and Byzantium's decline, which between 1371–1394 and again between 1424 and the Fall of Constantinople in 1453 made the rump Byzantine state a tributary vassal to the Ottomans. The 15th-century Ottoman historian Enveri somewhat uniquely uses the term tekfur also for the Frankish rulers of southern Greece and the Aegean islands.

== Sources ==
- Çolak, Hasan (2014). "Tekfur, fasiliyus and kayser: Disdain, Negligence and Appropriation of Byzantine Imperial Titulature in the Ottoman World". In Hadjianastasis, Marios (ed.). Frontiers of the Ottoman Imagination: Studies in Honour of Rhoads Murphey. BRILL. pp. 5–28. ISBN 9789004280915.
- Savvides, Alexios (2000). "Tekfur". In Bearman, P. J.; Bianquis, Th.; Bosworth, C. E.; van Donzel, E. & Heinrichs, W. P. (eds.). The Encyclopaedia of Islam, Second Edition. Volume X: T–U. Leiden: E. J. Brill. pp. 413–414. ISBN 978-90-04-11211-7.
