= Ottoman raids in Friuli =

Ottoman raids into north-eastern Italy

On four occasions in the 15th century, the Ottoman Empire raided the Patria del Friuli, then part of the Republic of Venice and nowadays north-eastern Italy. The first three raids (1472, 1477, 1478) took place during the First Ottoman–Venetian War. The final raid (1499) occurred during the Second Ottoman–Venetian War. These were overland raids launched as part of the Ottoman wars in Europe.

== Threats ==
The Ottoman threat to Friuli dates back to 1415, when they raided the neighbouring lands of Carniola, Styria and Lower Austria. At that time, Friuli still belonged to the Patriarchate of Aquileia. It was conquered by Venice only in 1420.

In June 1469, Ottoman forces reached Gorizia, but did not cross the Venetian frontier. In response, Venice hired the condottiere Deifobo dell'Anguillara, Galeotto Manfredi, Ercole Malvezzi and Fontaguzzio da Bologna. They also hired some lance spezzate and dispatched the cernide (peasant levies) of Bergamo, Crema, Brescia, Verona, Vicenza, Padua and Treviso. Similar tactics were repeated in defence of Friuli until 1477.

== Raids ==
=== 1470s ===
Domenico Malipiero records that the Ottomans crossed the frontier in November 1471, but no other known source mentions this. It is certain, however, that the Ottomans entered Friuli in the fall of 1472 under the leadership of Hasan Bey, perhaps a descendant of Evrenos. The raiders were primarily light cavalry known as akinjis. In November 1477, Turahanoğlu Ömer Bey led a raid into Friuli. At the first encounter along the Isonzo, the Venetian commanders Girolamo Novello and Giacomo Badoer were lured out of their fortress, fooled by a feigned retreat, and killed in the fighting. After that, Giacomo Martinengo and Francesco Michiel retreated, while Zaccaria Barbaro refused to leave the fortress at Gradisca. The republic hired Cola di Monforte, but he arrived too late. The Ottomans reached as far as the Tagliamento, and threatened Pordenone. The entire raid lasted only thirteen days.

By April 1478, Carlo da Montone was in charge of Venetian defences in Friuli, with Giacomo da Porcia and Antonio di Pers under his command. In July 1478, Turahanoğlu Ömer Bey launched another raid into Friuli, joined by Mihaloğlu Ali Bey, Malkoçoğlu Bali Bey and Skender Pasha. This second raid lasted four days. As part of a new strategy, Carlo da Montone remained in Gradisca. He sent small detachments of soldiers to harass the raiders, but refused to initiate a battle. The populace in the region fled to the fortresses for safety. The Ottomans pillaged Tolmino, Caporetto and Plezzo before crossing the Alps at the Predil Pass and raiding Fusine, Coccau and Villach.

The destruction of villages and churches during these raids is reported by Paolo Santonino in his itinerary for the years 1485–1487. The incursions are not mentioned in Suzi Çelebi's Gazavatnama Mihaloğlu.

=== 1499 ===
Following the raids of 1477–1478, the Venetians improved the fortifications of Gradisca and brought in light cavalry, the stratioti, and archers recruited from Durazzo, Morea, and Zante. In 1480, Sultan Mehmed II sought Venetian assistance in his planned attack on Otranto. To prevent the Venetians from informing the Neapolitans, he stationed forces at Val Canale, threatening to invade Friuli.

Skender Pasha returned to raid Friuli between 28 September and 5 October 1499 with 7,000 troops. He burned 132 villages and displaced or killed between 10,000 and 15,000 people. Andrea Zancani was in charge of the defences, but refused to leave Gradisca like Zaccaria Barbaro before him. Spilimbergo, Mortegliano and Udine successfully defended themselves. At Aviano, 2,000 people were taken as slaves to the Ottoman Empire. One of them, Giacomo da Sacile, later regained his freedom and served in the Venetian army.
