= Mihaloğlu Mehmed Bey =

Member of the Mihaloğulları family

- Died: January 1423; İznik
- Burial place: Plevna
- Military career
- Allegiance: Ottoman Empire
- Conflicts: Ottoman Interregnum, Revolt of Mustafa Çelebi

Mihaloğlu Mehmed Bey was a member of the Mihaloğlu family and one of the most important frontier warlords (uch bey) of the Ottoman Balkans during the last phase of the civil war of the Ottoman Interregnum (1403–1413), and during the early years of Murad II's reign.

== Life and career ==
According to the Ottomanist Franz Babinger, Mihaloğlu Mehmed was a son of Köse Mihal, a contemporary and companion of the founder of the Ottoman beylik, Osman I. Mehmed had four brothers, Yahşi or Bahşı, Aziz, Hızır, and Yusuf. Of them, only Yahşi, who died in 1413, is somewhat known.

=== Ottoman Interregnum ===
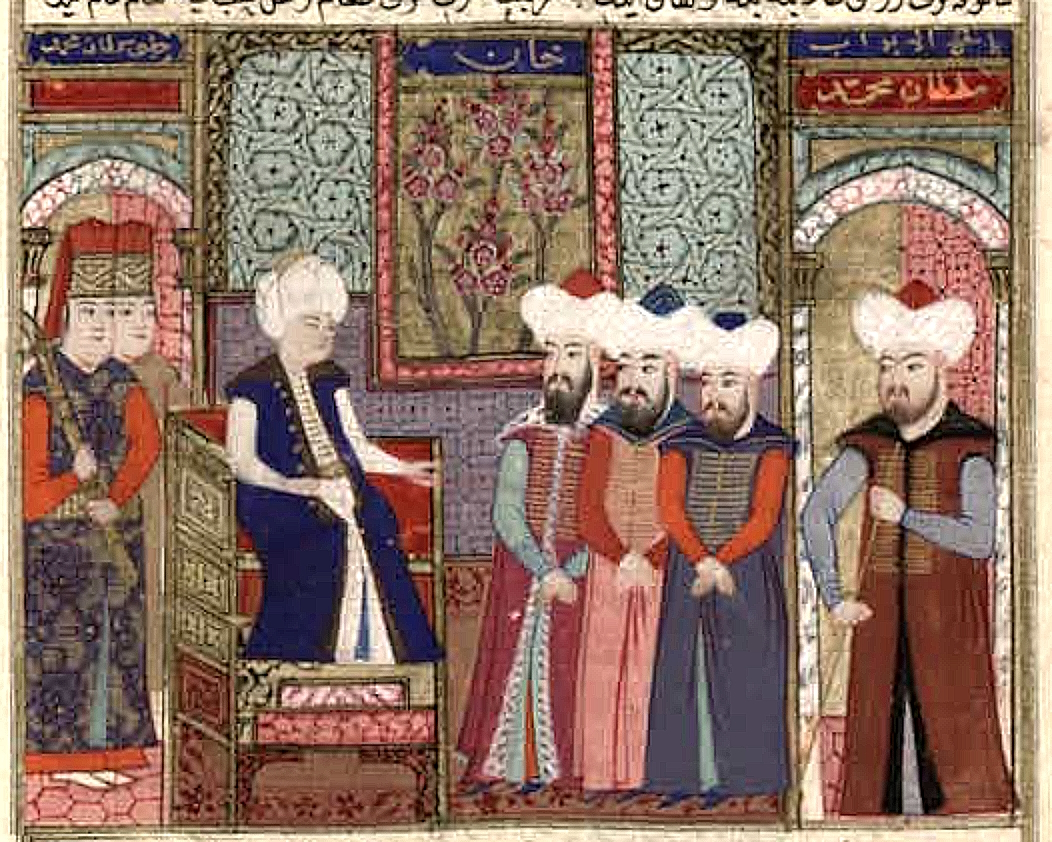
Mehmed I with court dignitaries, Ottoman miniature

When Musa Çelebi moved against his brother Süleyman Çelebi, Mihaloğlu Mehmed joined the former, and led the attack against Edirne that resulted in the capture of the city and the overthrow and death of Süleyman in late 1410/early 1411. As a reward, Musa appointed Mihaloğlu as beylerbey (commander in chief and governor-general) for Rumelia, possibly as a counterweight to two other powerful uc beğs, Evrenos and Pasha Yiğit Bey, who had been major figures in Süleyman's regime. Mihaloğlu was a close friend of Sheikh Bedreddin.

Despite this high favour, Mihaloğlu soon defected to another of Musa's brothers, Mehmed Çelebi, who ruled over Anatolia. The date of his defection is unclear; the Serbian historian Konstantin the Philosopher places it during Musa's siege of the Byzantine city of Selymbria in August/September 1411, while the anonymous Ottoman chronicle Ahval-i Sultan Mehemmed ("Affairs of Sultan Mehmed") places it somewhat later, during the Battle of İnceğiz. Other Ottoman sources do not mention his defection at all. According to Konstantin, Mihaloğlu had aided the escape of the Serbian ruler Đurađ Branković to Constantinople, and feared Musa's wrath; more likely, Mihaloğlu was worried that Musa might perceive him as a threat and eliminate him. Thus, while Musa was preoccupied with Selymbria, Mihaloğlu took charge of "the most select troops", ostensibly for an attack against Mehmed. Instead, he too went to Constantinople, where the Byzantines welcomed him and ferried him over to Anatolia.

By 1413, according to the Aḥvāl, Mihaloğlu served as a high-ranking commander under Mehmed Çelebi in the final phase of the civil war. He commanded Mehmed's vanguard in the first clash outside Bizye, and both there and later at a battle near the Maritsa River he played a major role in the defeat of Musa's forces. Abandoned by his beys, Musa was finally defeated in the Battle of Çamurlu. He tried to flee, but his horse got stuck in a rice paddy, where he was captured by Mihaloğlu and other Ottoman lords. Musa was executed soon after.

Given Mihaloğlu's previous treason, however, the victorious sultan Mehmed distrusted him, and imprisoned him at Tokat in Anatolia—far from Rumelia, where he might cause trouble.

=== Service under Murad II ===
After Sultan Mehmed died in 1421, his successor Murad II faced the rebellion of his uncle, Mustafa Çelebi. Aided by Junayd of Aydın, Mustafa had managed to win over the uc beğs of Rumelia, such as Turahan Bey, the sons of Evrenos, and the Kümelioğlu family, and had seized Edirne and the European provinces of the empire. On the advice of his councillors—three members of the Timurtaş family, Hacı Ivaz Pasha, and Çandarlı Ibrahim Pasha—Murad released Mihaloğlu from his prison and to assist in the campaign against Mustafa, and hopefully draw the Rumelian beys to murad's side. On his way westwards from Tokat, Mihaloğlu stopped and stayed with the young Aşıkpaşazade, the future historian, at the dervish tekke of Elvan Çelebi. Aşıkpaşazade accompanied Mihaloğlu Mehmed in his subsequent movements, and is the main source for Mehmed's activities.

In 1422, Mustafa crossed over to Anatolia with his army, while Murad moved with his troops from Bursa to confront them at Ulubad, where his men tore down the bridge over the Nilüfer River, blocking Mustafa's advance. The two armies met at the ruined bridge, with Murad's forces holding the eastern shore and Mustafa's the western. According to Aşıkpaşazade, Mehmed called across the water to the various Rumelian beys in Mustafa's army, accusing them of treachery, while others met with Junayd to convince him to desert with promises of restoring him to his former domains. At the same time, Hacı Ivaz sent false warnings to Mustafa that Murad would go around the nearby lake and attack Mustafa during the night. Junayd indeed abandoned Mustafa's camp, and when Hacı Ivaz feigned an attack during the night, Mustafa fled to the Dardanelles. The Rumelian beys remained behind with their men, and surrendered to Murad, who pardoned them. Murad then pursued his uncle, crossing the Dardanelles on 15 January 1422. His authority in tatters, Mustafa tried to flee to Wallachia, but was recognized, seized, and hanged at Edirne.

With his rule secure, Murad now turned against the Byzantines. According to a short chronicle, "on 10 June, Wednesday, at the fourth hour after midday, Mihaloğlu attacked Constantinople", thus beginning the siege of the city. The eyewitness John Kananos describes how the vanguard under Mihaloğlu ravaged the city's suburbs, before Murad himself arrived on 20 June and the siege began in earnest. In reaction, the Byzantines sponsored the rebellion of Murad's younger brother, Küçük Mustafa, in Anatolia. This was supported with men by the Anatolian beyliks of Germiyan and Karaman, who feared the revival of Ottoman power. Mustafa was thus able to gather a significant army, and in late August or early September laid siege to Bursa. When Murad learned of this, he called off the siege of Constantinople, and Mihaloğlu led the army of Rumelia to Anatolia. Mustafa did not resist long, fleeing to Constantinople on 30 September, whence he seized İznik, which he continued to rule until defeated and killed by Murad's forces in January 1423. During the fighting at İznik in 1423, Mihaloğlu Mehmed was killed by the kadi Taceddinoğlu Mehmed, and was reportedly buried at Plevna, in modern Bulgaria.

His son Hızır Bey was a distinguished military commander under Mehmed II, as were two of his grandsons, Ali Bey and Iskender Bey.

== Sources ==
- Başar, Fahamettin (2005). "Mihaloğulları" (PDF). İslâm Ansiklopedisi, Vol. 30 (Misra - Muhammediye) (in Turkish). Istanbul: Turkiye Diyanet Vakfi. pp. 24–25. ISBN 9789753894258.
- Babinger, Franz (1993). "Mīk̲h̲āl-Og̲h̲lu". In Bosworth, C. E.; van Donzel, E.; Heinrichs, W. P. & Pellat, Ch. (eds.). The Encyclopaedia of Islam, Second Edition. Volume VII: Mif–Naz. Leiden: E. J. Brill. pp. 34–35. doi:10.1163/1573-3912_islam_SIM_5193. ISBN 978-90-04-09419-2.
- Heywood, C. J. (1993). "Muṣṭafā Čelebi, Düzme". In Bosworth, C. E.; van Donzel, E.; Heinrichs, W. P. & Pellat, Ch. (eds.). The Encyclopaedia of Islam, Second Edition. Volume VII: Mif–Naz. Leiden: E. J. Brill. pp. 710–712. doi:10.1163/1573-3912_islam_COM_0815. ISBN 978-90-04-09419-2.
- Imber, Colin (1990). The Ottoman Empire: 1300-1481. Isis. ISBN 978-975-428-015-9.
- Kastritsis, Dimitris (2007). The Sons of Bayezid: Empire Building and Representation in the Ottoman Civil War of 1402-13. BRILL. ISBN 978-90-04-15836-8.
