= Köse Mihal =

Byzantine governor of Chirmenkia and battle companion of Osman Ghazi

Tekfur (Note: until 1304/1313) Köse Mihal: Ghazi
- (Michael Kosses)

Tekfur of Harman Kaya
- In office ?–1304/1313
- Succeeded by: Ottoman occupation

Personal details
- Born: Michael Kosses
- Died: c. 1340
- Children: Mihaloğlu Mehmed Bey; Mihaloğlu Yahşi Bey
- Dynasty: Mihaloğulları
- Religion: Eastern Orthodoxy; Sunni Islam
- Military career
- Allegiance: Byzantine Empire (Note: (? – 1304/1313)); Kayı tribe (Note: (1304/1313 – 1299)); (Ottoman Empire) Ottoman Beylik (Note: (1299 – c. 1340))
- Branch: Byzantine army; Kayı warriors (Note: Alongside Konur Alp, Abdurrahman Gazi, Turgut Alp and others); (Ottoman Empire) Ottoman Army; (Ottoman Empire) Akinji Corps
- Service years: c. 1313 – 1340
- Known for: Founder of the Mihaloğulları
- Conflicts: Siege of Bursa; Battle of Bapheus

Köse Mihal (Ottoman Turkish: كوسه ميخال, lit. 'Michael the Beardless'; 13th century – c. 1340) accompanied Osman I in his ascent to power as a bey and founder of the Ottoman Empire. He is considered to be the first significant Byzantine renegade and convert to Islam to enter Ottoman service (see Nöker).

He was also known as Gazi Mihal (Ottoman Turkish: غازى ميخال) and Abdullah Mihal Gazi. He ruled over Harmankaya Kalesi (Ottoman Turkish: خرمن قيا قلعه سى).

== Life ==
Köse Mihal was the Byzantine governor of Chirmenkia (Harmankaya, today Harmanköy) and was ethnically Greek. His original name was "Michael Kosses". Some historical sources (such as claims by historian Joseph von Hammer) suggest that Michael Kosses belonged to the Byzantine Palaiologos family. The castle of Harmankaya was in the foothills of the Uludağ Mountains in Bilecik, Turkey. Mihal also eventually gained control of Lefke, Mekece and Akhisar.

Even before his conversion to Islam, Mihal had an amicable relationship with the Ottoman leader, Osman Ghazi. He was an ally of Osman and his people in war, and also acted as a leader of the local Greek population. Additionally, he acted as a consultant and diplomatic agent for Osman I. The sources describing the reason behind Mihal's change of faith vary. One tradition emphasises the influence exerted by his friendship with Osman Ghazi, whilst another describes him having experienced a significant dream which convinced him to become a Muslim. His conversion is thought to have occurred between 1304 and 1313. As a Muslim, he was known as Köse Mihal 'Abd Allah (Abdullah), Abdullah being a name commonly adopted by converts.

Up to the conquest of Bursa in 1326, Köse Mihal played an important role as a diplomatic advisor and envoy of Orhan I, the son and successor of Osman Ghazi. Köse Mihal was the first important Christian renegade to become an Ottoman subject, and he played a significant role in the creation of the Ottoman state. Köse Mihal's descendants, known as the Mihaloğlu, were famous, particularly in the 15th and 16th centuries. They were a politically and militarily successful family of Ottoman dignitaries in Rumelia. However, they did not reach the very highest public offices.

After the taking of Bursa, Köse Mihal is no longer mentioned in the sources. Kreutel notes that Köse Mihal died around 1340. According to some historians, Köse Mihal was buried in a mosque he himself built at Edirne (Adrianople) and a türbe was built for him. In this tradition Köse Mihal was believed to have lived until after the Ottoman capture of Adrianople by Murad I in the year 1361. He would therefore have lived to a very advanced age indeed. However, historian Franz Babinger appears to have made a mistake. He confused Köse Mihal with Ghazi Mihal Bey, a grandson of Köse Mihal. Ghazi Mihal Bey built a now ruined mosque complex, with an Imaret and Hamam, in Edirne, which was completed in 1422. The cemetery adjoining the complex holds the tomb of Ghazi Mihal Bey.

== Issue ==
After his conversion, Mihal had two sons:

- Mihaloğlu Mehmed Bey. He had two sons:
  - Mihaloğlu Ghazi Mihal Bey
  - Mihaloğlu Hizir Bey (d. 1452). He had four sons:
    - Mihaloğlu Ali Bey. He married a Christian Wallachian noblewoman, Maria Craiovești, who converted to Islam and took the name Mahitab Hatun; they had five sons and a daughter.
    - Mihaloğlu Iskender Pasha. He had two sons and two daughters.
    - Mihaloğlu Ghazi Bali Bey
    - Mihaloğlu Mehmed Bey
- Mihaloğlu Yahşi Bey

== Legacy ==
Mihal's descendants (the Mikhaloglu/Mikhaloglou; Greek: Μιχαλόγλου) held prominent positions throughout the following centuries of Ottoman history.

At one point, the oldest surviving Ottoman artifact was Orhan's helmet. But on 5 December 2020, the Ministry of National Defense of Turkey announced that Mihal's sword was recorded as the oldest surviving Ottoman artifact, and was taken to the Istanbul Military Museum.

=== In popular culture ===
In the Turkish television series Kuruluş "Osmancık" (1988), Köse Mihal was portrayed by the Turkish actor Ahmet Mekin.

In the Turkish film Killing the Shadows (2006), Köse Mihal is portrayed by Serdar Gökhan.

In the Turkish series Kuruluş: Osman, Köse Mihal is portrayed by Serhat Kılıç.

== See also ==
- Renegade thesis
- Turgut Alp
- Konur Alp
