= Battle of Isonzo (1477) =

Ottoman-Venetian battle in 1477

Coordinates: 45°57′N 13°33′E

- Part of the Ottoman–Venetian War (1463–1479) and Ottoman raids in Friuli
Date	Late October 1477
Location	Preval Plain
Result	Ottoman victory

Belligerents
Ottoman Empire	Republic of Venice

Commanders and leaders
Iskander Pasha; Ömer Bey; Mihaloğlu Ali Bey	Girolamo Novella †; Giacomo Badoer †; Antonio Caldora (POW); Iacopo Piccinino (POW); Philippo de Navolin (POW)

Strength
1,000 cavalry	Unknown

Casualties and losses
Unknown	Heavy

The battle of Isonzo was a military engagement between the Ottoman army and Venetians near the river of Soča during the Ottoman–Venetian War (1463–1479). The Ottomans emerged victorious during the battle.

== Background ==
in 1420, Venice began expanding in Friuli by taking it over from Patria del Friuli. This area served the Venetians well during their war with the Ottomans between 1463 and 1479 when it was a target for Ottoman Akinjis. In 1472, the Ottomans launched a raid reaching the gates of Udine. The next year, another serious raid happened. In response, Venice built earthen forts from Gorizia to Aquileia. On November 26, 1476, an Ottoman raid reached Koper, taking many slaves. The defenses proved ineffective to the Ottoman raiders.

== Battle ==
In October 1477, the Ottomans launched another raid; they were led by Skender Pasha, a Greco-Genoese, and Turahanoğlu Ömer Bey. The Ottomans successfully captured the bridge at Gorizia before the news of the raids reached the Venetian camp at Gradisca d'Isonzo. Ömer Bey led a force of 1,000 cavalry to cross the Isonzo River and began preparing for an ambush. Despite his father's warning, the Venetian commander, Girolamo Novella of Verona, marched to meet the Ottoman, making a major mistake. Girolamo's son set out in pursuit of the raiders. They fell into the ambush and were routed. Fierce fighting ensued in which Girolamo and his son, alongside another commander by the name of Giacomo Badoer, were killed. Apart from many killed, the Ottomans also captured numerous prisoners, including Count Antonio Caldora, Iacopo Piccinino, and Philippo de Navolin of Mantua. The Ottomans then crossed the Tagliamento and Isonso rivers, ravaging at will.

== Aftermath ==
The raid created terror in Venice. Venice continued its war, despite being abandoned by many of its allies. Both sides made a peace treaty in February 1479.

== Sources ==
- Franz Babinger (1978), Mehmed the Conqueror and His Time.
- James D. Tracy (2016), Balkan Wars, Habsburg Croatia, Ottoman Bosnia, and Venetian Dalmatia, 1499–1617.
- Edward Muir (1998), Mad Blood Stirring, Vendetta and Factions in Friuli During the Renaissance.
