= Yahyapaşazade Bali Bey =

Ottoman commander and governor

- Born: Bali; Before 1470; Ottoman Empire
- Died: 1527; Ottoman Empire
- Relatives: Yahyapaşaoğlu family
- Military career
- Allegiance: Ottoman Empire
- Rank: bey, sanjakbey
- Nickname: Küçük

Yahyapaşazade Bali Bey (fl. 1485–d. 1527) was an Ottoman general and governor, notably serving as the sanjakbey of Smederevo.

== Early life ==
Bali was the son of Yahya Pasha (d. 1509 or after July 1511), and he had six younger brothers, one of whom was Mehmed. The family was based in Skopje. Yahya Pasha was an esteemed Ottoman statesman who served as beylerbey of Anatolia and Rumelia. Yahya was the patriarch and first Islamized member of the family. The family did not belong to the Malkoçoğlu family. The family had no royal blood; his father remarried a daughter of Sultan Bayezid II, Aynışah (also her second marriage), but none of Yahya's sons were from this marriage. The birth year of Bali is unknown. The oldest mention of him is from 1485.

== Career ==
Bali is mentioned in 1485 as a ziamet-holder in Bosnia. He is next mentioned as the commander (soubashi) of the Yürüks, a peasant military unit in the Balkans (Rumelia). In 1498 he accompanied Malkoçoğlu Bali Bey's invasion of Poland, from where he gained much loot. At this time he was a sanjakbey of one of the Rumelian sanjaks, but it is unclear which. In 1504 he was the bey of the liva of Kyustendil. In 1506 he was the sanjakbey of Avlona. In 1509 he was the governor of Silistra. Between August and October 1811 he was appointed the sanjakbey of Nicopolis. He married a granddaughter of Bayezid II. In the dynastic struggle between Bayezid II and Selim, Bali played both sides, but supported Selim in the end. In late 1513 he was appointed the sanjakbey of Smederevo, the most important frontier district. In this post, he had direct command over operations against the Kingdom of Hungary. In 1515 he destroyed John Zapolya at Avala. In small interruptions, he was reassigned to Iskenderiyye (1518–20), Bosnia (1521) and Vidin (1523–24), but most of his career was as the sanjakbey of Smederevo. In 1520–21, he was closely involved in Sultan Suleyman's change of war policy from the east to the west.

Bali had a prominent role in the Siege of Belgrade (1521) and the Battle of Mohacs (1526).

He died some time between February and April 1527. He was buried in a turbe near Smederevo, which still existed into the 19th century. Following his death, his younger brother Mehmed served as sanjakbey of Smederevo.

His contemporaries had negative descriptions of him, and he had several complaints on him at the Porte.

== Annotations ==
1. His patronymic is also spelt Yahyapaşaoglu, Yahya Paşaoglu and Yahyapaşa-oğlu. He was known during his lifetime in Hungarian sources as Küçük ("small"), perhaps to distinguish him from the other, "great" Malkoçoğlu Bali Bey. Also known as Serbo-Croatian: Bali-beg Jahjapašić.

== Sources ==
- Fodor, Pál (2019). "Wolf on the Border: Yahyapaşaoğlu Bali Bey (?-1527)". In Fodor, Pál; Kovács, Nándor Erik; Péri, Benedek (eds.). Şerefe. Studies in Honour of Prof. Géza Dávid on His Seventieth Birthday. Budapest: Research Centre for the Humanities, Hungarian Academy of Sciences. pp. 57–87.
- Fotić, Aleksandar (2001). "YAHYAPAŞA-OĞLU MEHMED PASHA'S EVKAF IN BELGRADE". Acta Orientalia Academiae Scientiarum Hungaricae. 54 (4). Akadémiai Kiadó: 437–452. ISSN 0001-6446. JSTOR 23658314 – via Academia.edu.
- Bojanić, D (1985). "Požarevac u XVI veku i Bali-beg Jahjapašić". Istorijski časopis. XXXII: 49–77. ISSN 0350-0802.

Preceded by ?	sanjakbey of Avlona; 1506–1508	Succeeded by ?
Preceded by ?	sanjakbey of Silistra; 1509–1511	Succeeded by ?
Preceded by ?	sanjakbey of Nicopolis; 1511–1513	Succeeded by ?
Preceded by Hadım Sinan Pasha	sanjakbey of Smederevo; 1513–1518	Succeeded by ?
Preceded by ?	sanjakbey of Bosnia; 1521–15 September 1521	Succeeded by Gazi Husrev Bey
Preceded by ?	sanjakbey of Smederevo (and Belgrade); 15 September 1521–1523	Succeeded by ?
Preceded by ?	sanjakbey of Vidin; 1523–1524	Succeeded by ?
Preceded by ?	sanjakbey of Smederevo; 1524–1527	Succeeded by Mehmed Pasha
