= Battle of Buzău =

1462 battle of the Ottoman-Wallachian wars

- Part of Ottoman–Wallachian wars
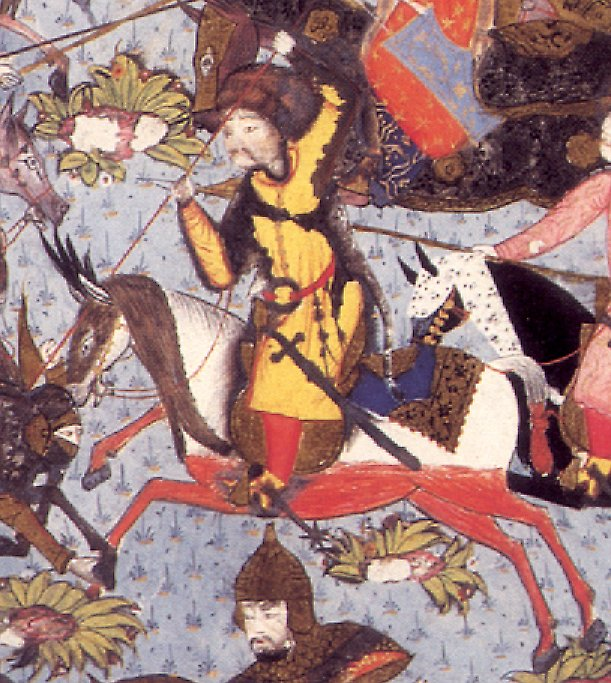
- Ottoman Akinji in the battle
Date	1462
Location	Romania, Buzău
Result	Ottoman victory

Belligerents
Ottoman Empire	Wallachia

Commanders and leaders
Mehmed II; Mahmud Angelović; Evrenosoğlu Ali; Mihaloğlu Ali; Skender Pasha; Ömer Bey; Evranos Ahmed; Umur Beg; Bali Beg; Albanian Nasuh	(Wallachia) Vlad III

Strength
Unknown	7,000

Casualties and losses
Unknown	5,300 killed 1,000 captured

The Battle of Buzău was an engagement that took place during Mehmed II’s Wallachian campaign of 1462. As a result of the battle, the Wallachians were defeated and lost a significant portion of their forces.

== Background ==
Seeing the regular Ottoman army cross the Danube and enter Wallachia, Vlad Dracul sought to wear down the Turks through guerrilla-style attacks. The Ottoman army and Vlad's forces clashed several times, during which Mehmed II inflicted heavy losses on the Wallachians. Since the engagements throughout the campaign were generally conducted in a hit-and-run manner, Mehmed II made extensive use of raider (akınjı) units. Mihaloğlu Ali Bey and Turahanoğlu Ömer Bey pursued Vlad for forty days, gradually pressing and constraining him within Wallachia.

== Battle ==
Seeing his country devastated by the akıncı raids, Vlad positioned his army at a point where he expected to intercept Evrenosoğlu Ali Bey. Burdened by the booty they had taken, Ali Bey's forces had begun to move on foot when they were suddenly attacked by Wallachian troops.

The akıncı units had been caught in a very unfavorable position, far from the main Ottoman army under Mehmed II, and their destruction seemed almost certain. However, the main Ottoman army, commanded by Mehmed II, advanced rapidly and reached the vicinity of the encircled akıncı forces. Although the Wallachians spotted some Ottoman units near the forested hills belonging to Mehmed's main army, they mistook them for scattered raider detachments. Consequently, they attacked the akıncı troops without hesitation. Meanwhile, Mahmud Pasha had already deployed the army in battle formation. On the right wing were Turahanoğlu Ömer, Evrenoszade Ahmed, Mihaloğlu Ali, and Malkoçoğlu Bali Bey; on the left wing were Arnavut Nasuh, Develioğlu Umur, and Mihaloğlu İskender.

Laonikos Chalkokondyles and the Ottoman chroniclers present this engagement as a major victory for Mehmed II. Initially, Mehmed II sent a small detachment forward to relieve Ali Bey's forces and delay the Wallachian army while he organized his troops into battle order. However, the Rumelian units that were sent ahead were routed by the Wallachians. At the same time, Mehmed II dispatched Mahmud Pasha to move behind the enemy, aiming to inflict heavy losses on them during their retreat.

The main Ottoman army under Mehmed II then swiftly entered the battlefield. Seeing the Ottoman troops emerging from beneath the trees, the Wallachians panicked and began to flee. When they turned back, however, they encountered the units Mahmud Pasha had positioned to the rear. In the ensuing battle, of the 7,000-man Wallachian force, only 700 escaped, meaning 5,300 were killed, and 1,000 were taken prisoner. Thus, Vlad was deprived of a force numbering 7,000 men.
