= Mihaloğlu =

Distinguished family of akıncı leaders and frontier lords

The Mihaloğlu or Mihalzâde ("son of Michael"), in the collective plural Mihaloğulları ("Sons/descendants of Michael"), were a distinguished family of akıncı leaders and frontier lords (uç bey) of the early Ottoman Empire.

The family descended from Köse Mihal, the Byzantine lord of Chirmenkia (modern Harmanköy), who may have been a member of the Byzantine imperial dynasty of the Palaiologoi. After converting to Islam, he became a companion of the founder of the Ottoman beylik, Osman I, and played a considerable part in the early expansion of the Ottoman state. He and his descendants bore, until the early 16th century, the hereditary title of "commander of the akıncıs". According to the great Ottomanist Franz Babinger, along with the Evrenosoğulları, the Malkoçoğulları, the Timurtaşoğulları, and the Turahanoğulları, the Mihaloğulları were "among the most celebrated of the noble families of the early Ottoman empire".

Köse Mihal had two sons, Mehmed, who played an important role in the Ottoman Interregnum and the early years of Murad II's reign, and Yahşi or Bahşi, who is relatively unknown. Mehmed's son Hızır Bey was a distinguished military commander under Mehmed II, as were two of his grandsons, Ali Bey and Iskender Bey; a third brother, Bali Bey, is less known, although he too earned the honorific gazi. Another Mehmed, who was active in the early 16th century and died in 1543, is variously given as either a fourth son of Hızır, or the son of Ali. A Mihaloğlu Ahmed who lived at about the middle of the 16th century is possibly the last to have held and exercised the hereditary title of leader of akinjis, and the family begins to decline thereafter. They survived till modern times, however, and retained extensive estates in much of Bulgaria, around Edirne, and, according to the 17th-century traveller Evliya Çelebi, estates at Amasya and Bursa.

== Sources ==
- Başar, Fahamettin (2005). "Mihaloğulları" (PDF). TDV Encyclopedia of Islam, Vol. 30 (Misra – Muhammedi̇yye) (in Turkish). Istanbul: Presidency of Religious Affairs, Centre for Islamic Studies. pp. 24–25. ISBN 978-975-389-402-9.
- Babinger, Franz (1993). "Mīk̲h̲āl-Og̲h̲lu". In Bosworth, C. E.; van Donzel, E.; Heinrichs, W. P. & Pellat, Ch. (eds.). The Encyclopaedia of Islam, Second Edition. Volume VII: Mif–Naz. Leiden: E. J. Brill. pp. 34–35. doi:10.1163/1573-3912_islam_SIM_5193. ISBN 978-90-04-09419-2.
