= Battle of Pozazin =

- Part of the Hungarian–Ottoman Wars
- Hungarian and Turkish Cavalry
Date	1460
Location	Pozazin (Alsópozsgás), Kingdom of Hungary (now Pojejena, Romania)
Result	Ottoman victory

Belligerents
Ottoman Empire	Kingdom of Hungary

Commanders and leaders
Gazi Alauddin Mihaloğlu Ali Bey; Mihaloğlu İskender Paşa	Michael Szilágyi (POW); Gergely Lábatlani (POW)

Strength
3,000	20,000

Casualties and losses
Unknown	Heavy

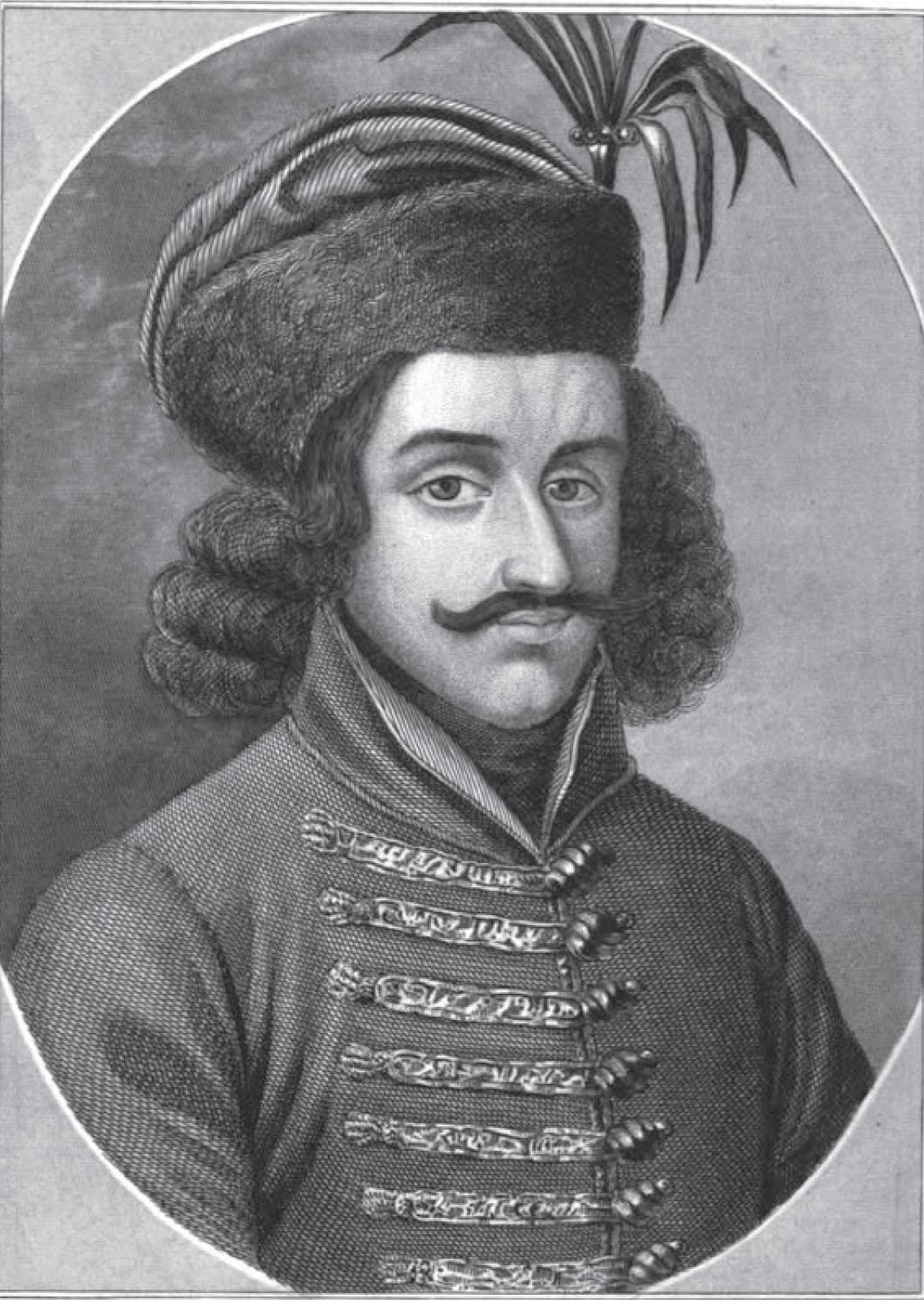
Steel engraving portrait of Mihály Szilágyi from the book "The Age of the Hunyadi" by Count József Teleki. Volume III. (Emich Gusztáv Publishing House, Pest, 1880)

The Battle of Pozazin was a military engagement which took place east of Smederevo in 1460. Ottoman forces commanded by Mihaloğlu Ali Bey defeated a Hungarian army led by Michael Szilágyi. The Hungarian leader and many of his followers were captured and later executed on orders of Mehmed II.

== Conflict ==
After King Matthias of Hungary rejected a peace proposal from Sultan Mehmed II, the sultan ordered renewed large-scale military preparations for a raid into Hungarian territory. In response, Michael Szilágyi, accompanied by Gergely Lábatlani, positioned himself near Keve Castle (now Kovin, Serbia) with a comparatively small force, intending to prevent the Ottoman army from crossing the border. An Ottoman contingent of significantly greater strength, led by the Mihaloğlu brothers, Ali Bey and Skander Bey, crossed the Danube near Smederevo. Szilágyi was lured into an ambush at Pozazin (Alsópozsgás) (now Pojejena, Romania), where his forces were surrounded. After an engagement, Szilágyi and Lábatlani were captured. Both men were taken to Constantinople. On the orders of Sultan Mehmed II, Szilágyi was executed by beheading. Lábatlani, however, was spared after being exchanged for the son of an Ottoman pasha held in Hungarian captivity. This marked his second survival of Ottoman captivity, having previously been captured and released following the Battle of Varna.
