= Ichthyophagi =

Ancient name for several peoples

Latin Ichthyophagi and Greek Ichthyophagoi (Ancient Greek: Ἰχθυοφάγοι, romanized: Ĭkhthŭophắgoi, lit. 'fish-eaters, piscivores', "fish-eaters") are the names given by ancient geographers to several ethnically unrelated coast-dwelling peoples in different parts of the world.

- Herodotus (book i. c. 200) mentions three tribes of the Babylonians who were solely fish-eaters. In book iii. c. 19, he refers to Ichthyophagi in Aethiopia. Diodorus Siculus and Strabo also referred to them all along the African coast of the Red Sea in their descriptions of Aethiopia.
- Ptolemy speaks of fish-eaters on the Persian Gulf coasts, coast of the Red Sea, the west coast of Africa and the coast of the Far East near the harbour of Cattigara.
- Pliny relates the existence of such people on the islands in the Persian Gulf.
- According to Arrian, Nearchus mentions such a race as inhabiting the barren shores of the Gwadar and Pasni districts in Makrān. During the homeward march of Alexander the Great, his admiral, Nearchus led a fleet in Arabian Sea along the Makrān coast and recorded that the area was dry and mountainous, inhabited by the Ichthyophagoi or Fish-Eaters.
- Pausanias locates them on the western (African) coast of the Red Sea.
- They are a people group identified on the 4th century Peutinger Map as a people of the Baluchistan coast. The existence of such tribes was confirmed by Sir Richard F. Burton (El-Medinah, p. 144).
- It is the name Laskaris Kananos used for the Icelanders in the 15th century.
- They are described in the Liber Monstrorum as fully naked and covered in hair, inhabiting streams and ponds near the Indian Ocean in India.

== See also ==
- Troglodyti
- Huteimi
- Solluba
- Eskimos
- Anthrophagi
