= Nöker (military) =

Historical Mongolian military title

A nöker was a member of a group of military comrades in medieval Mongolian and Turkic armies. The word nöker means "comrade" in the Mongol language.

The nökers were characterized by long-term subordination and loyalty to a single leader. In turn, the leader was responsible for maintaining the wealth of the nökers. The historian Halil İnalcık sees the nöker relationship as comparable to the commendatio or homage of the medieval armies in Europe.

== Mongol armies ==
Nökers comprised an important element in the Mongol armies, but they also served to carry out non-military tasks. For example, Möngke Khan, the great khan of the Mongol Empire (r. 1251–1259), tasked his nökers with tax collection and legation. Sometimes, nökers were appointed as governors of newly-conquered territories. Except in cases when they were assigned duties, they always accompanied their leader.

== Seljuks of Anatolia ==
After the Mongol Empire, the nöker system was taken over by the Turkic states. The nöker concept was not much different than the Nöker of the Mongols. They accompanied their leader in war and peace. Sometimes, they were also tasked as local governors. For example, the founders of the Karesi and Saruhan beyliks were initially nökers of Mesut II of the Seljuks of Anatolia.

== Ottoman Empire ==
In the early years of the Ottoman beylik (before independence), Osman I was one of the many ghazis. But, after his successful raids to Byzantine Empire territory, he became a leader, and his fellow ghazis became his nökers. Initially, his nökers were Turkmen ghazis. But, some Byzantine soldiers converted to Islam and among them some chose to be Osman's nökers as well. Köse Mihal was a well known example. The nöker system in the Ottoman Empire ended by the 16th century.
