= Siege of Constantinople (1422) =

1422 siege of Constantinople by the Ottoman Empire

Coordinates: 41.0167°N 28.9769°E

- Part of the Byzantine–Ottoman wars
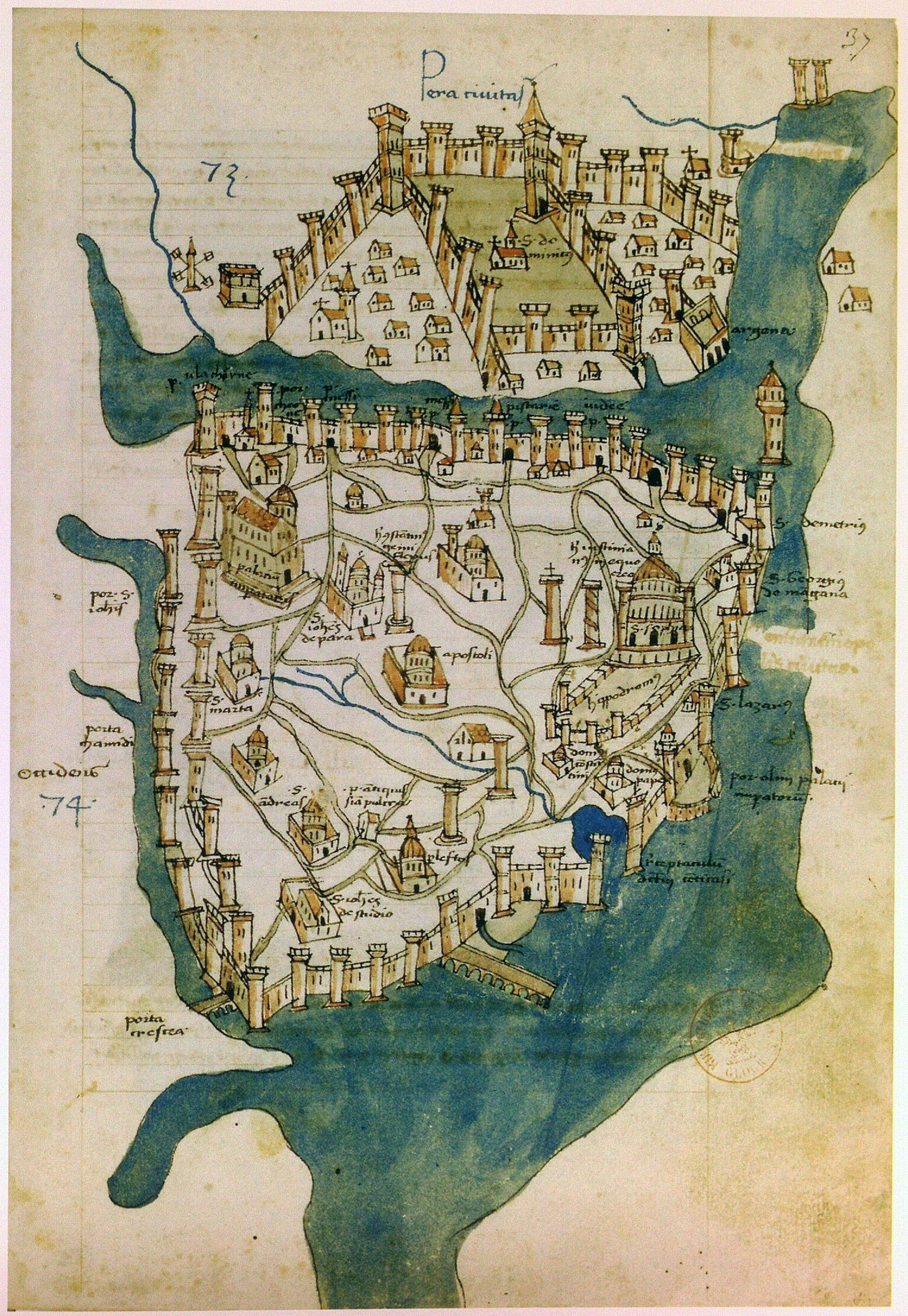
- Constantinople in 1422; the oldest surviving map of the city
Date	10 June – September 1422
Location	Constantinople (modern-day Istanbul, Turkey)
Result	Byzantine victory

Belligerents
Byzantine Empire	Ottoman Empire

Commanders and leaders
(Byzantine Empire) Manuel II Palaiologos (Byzantine Empire) John VIII Palaiologos	(Ottoman Empire) Murad II (Ottoman Empire) Mehmed Bey

In 1422, the Ottoman Empire laid siege to Constantinople, the capital of the Byzantine Empire, as a result of the Byzantine Emperor Manuel II's attempts to interfere in the succession of Ottoman Sultans, after the death of Mehmed I in 1421. This policy of the Byzantines was often used successfully in weakening their neighbours.

When Murad II emerged as the winning successor to his father, he marched into Byzantine territory. The Turks had acquired their own cannon for the first time by the siege of 1422, "falcons", which were short but wide cannons. The two sides were evenly matched technologically, and the Turks had to build barricades "in order to receive ... the stones of the bombards".

== Siege ==
According to a Byzantine short chronicle compiled in c. 1425, "on 10 June, Wednesday, at the fourth hour after midday, Mihaloğlu attacked Constantinople", thus beginning the siege of the city. The eyewitness John Kananos describes how the vanguard under Mihaloğlu ravaged the city's suburbs, before Murad himself arrived on 20 June with the main army and the siege engines, and the siege began in earnest.

Murad was forced to lift the siege due to the rebellion of his younger brother, Küçük Mustafa, in Anatolia. This was supported with men by the Anatolian beyliks of Germiyan and Karaman, who feared a revival of Ottoman power, as well as, according to Doukas, money given by the Byzantine emperor. Mustafa was thus able to gather a significant army, and in late August or early September laid siege to the Ottoman capital, Bursa. Contemporary Byzantine tradition ascribed the deliverance of Constantinople to a miraculous intervention by the Theotokos.

== Aftermath ==
In spite of the Byzantine victory, the 'Empire' at this time had in fact been reduced to a few disconnected strips of land besides the city of Constantinople itself. It was also facing grave economic problems and severely lacked soldiers. Any new cannons after the 1422 siege were gifts from European states, and aside from these no other advances were made to the Byzantine arsenal. As such, the next Ottoman leader, Mehmed II, would be successful in 1453.

== Traditions ==
Byzantine accounts attributed the lifting of the siege to an apparition of the Theotokos upon the city walls, which greatly inspired the defenders. John Kananos records that:

The Romans, although exhausted from fatigue, leapt and were glad… They shouted hymns to the Most Holy Virgin, glorifying her from the depths of their hearts, saying "This is in truth a rich, celebrated, memorable, extraordinary and remarkable miracle worthy of admiration."

Also in the same reference, the Ottoman Army notes that they themselves even saw a woman in purple robes walking on the outer ramparts of the city.

== Sources ==
- Imber, Colin (1990). The Ottoman Empire: 1300-1481. Isis. ISBN 978-975-428-015-9.
