= Shahnama-yi Al-i Osman =

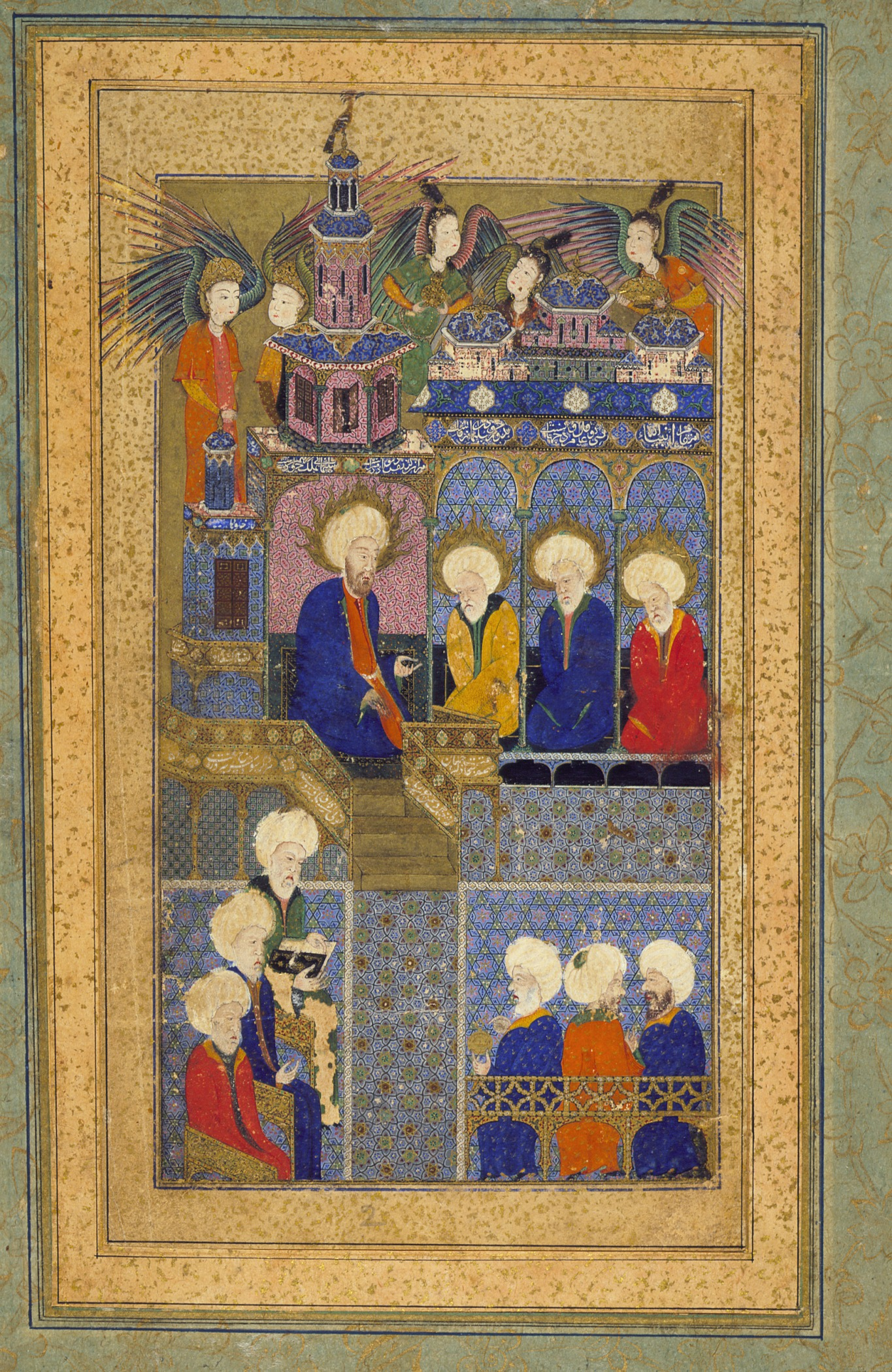
Sultan Suleiman in the Guise of King Solomon; Page from a Manuscript of the Shahnama-yi Al-i Osman

The Shahnama-yi Al-i Osman (or Shahnameh-ye Al-e Osman; "Book of Kings of the House of Osman") is a 1558 Ottoman work of universal and Islamic history written in Persian. It was written in five volumes by Fethullah Arif (died c. 1561-1562), an Ottoman writer and court eulogist, for his patron Sultan Suleiman the Magnificent (r. 1520–1566). Only three volumes are extant.

The literary and to a lesser extent visual agenda of Arif's work imitated Ferdowsi's classic portrayal of Iranian legendary history as shown in his Shahnameh ("Book of Kings")," as is clear from the title. Indeed, Arif explicitly showed his model—Ferdowsi's work—by selecting the title Shahnama-yi Al-i Osman.

The calligraphers of the work hailed from Shiraz, Shirvan and Herat and were experts in the Nastaliq script.

- The first book, Anbiyanama ("The Book of Prophets"), starts with Adam and Eve, continues with various Old Testament prophets and significant individuals from Iranian mythology (such as king Kayumars, Zahhak, and notably Jamshid), and concludes with the Islamic prophet Muhammad ascending to heaven. It has 48 text folios and 10 paintings, and it was finished in the first few days of March 1558.
- The second and third volumes, which are lost, were likely intended to concentrate on Muhammad and the development of Islam as well as the history of previous Turkish kings, such as the Seljuks.
- Osmannama ("The Book of Osman"), the fourth unfinished chapter that was supposed to contain a history of the Ottoman dynasty prior to Suleiman, ends in 1402. It covers nearly a century of Ottoman history with 205 folios and 34 paintings.
- The longest of the three volumes that are still in existence is the fifth, also known as the Süleymanname. It was completed in late June or early July 1558, has 617 folios, 69 paintings, four of which are double-page spreads, and is composed of 60,000 couplets.

== Sources ==
- Eryılmaz, Fatma Sinem (2013). "From Adam to Suleyman: Visual Representations of Authority in ʽĀrif's Shāhnāma-yi Āl-i ʽOs̠mān". In Çıpa, H. Erdem; Fetvacı, Emine (eds.). Writing History at the Ottoman Court: Editing the Past, Fashioning the Future. Indiana University Press.
- Eryılmaz, Fatma Sinem (2018). "The Sulaiman-nama (Süleyman-name) as an Historical Source". In van den Berg, Gabrielle; Melville, Charles (eds.). Shahnama Studies III: The Reception of the Shahnama. Brill.
- Şahin, Kaya (2023). Peerless Among Princes: The Life and Times of Sultan Süleyman. Oxford University Press.
- Tanındı, Zeren (2011). "The Illustration of the Shahnama and the Art of the Book in Ottoman Turkey". In Melville, Charles; van den Berg, Gabrielle (eds.). Shahnama Studies II: The Reception of Firdausi's Shahnama. Brill.
