= Malkoçoğlu family =

Ottoman noble family

Malkoçoğulları
- Country: Ottoman Empire
- Founded: 14th century
- Titles: ghazi ("warrior") akıncı ("raider")
- Dissolution: 1604; 422 years ago

The Malkoçoğlu family (Turkish: Malkoçoğulları, Malkoçoğlu ailesi) (Serbian: Malković) or Yahyali was one of the ghazi families of Serbian origin that led the akıncı corps in the Ottoman Empire between the 14th and 16th centuries. They served mainly in the Balkan conquest of the empire. The members of the family usually served as beys, sanjak-beys, beylerbeys, pashas, and castle commanders. Later on, they joined the ranks of the Ottoman Army in various missions, and one of the descendants became a Grand Vizier.

== History ==
The Battle of Maritsa (1371) was a disaster for the Serbian Empire, which resulted in several Serbian and Bulgarian lords becoming Ottoman vassals. The Malkoçoğlu was a warrior family of Christian Serb origin, which became Muslim. Malkoç, the eponymous founder, is alleged to have been one of the commanders of Sultan Murad I and Bayezid I, fighting at Kosovo (1389) and at Nicopolis (1396).

The further Ottoman expansion to the European frontiers was shared with semi-independent warriors, with the most notable being the four families of Evrenosoğulları, Mihaloğulları, both of which were of Anatolian Christian origin, Turahanoğulları of Turkish origin, and the Malkoçoğulları. These four families made up the gazi (warrior) nobility. Unpaid they lived and operated as raiders on the frontiers of the Ottoman Empire, subsisting totally on plunder.

== Members ==
Duganli – Kara Osman's family

- Kara Osman Bey (Serbo-Croatian: Kara Osman-beg), cavalry commander, sanjakbey of the Sanjak of Herzegovina whose türbe is in Kopčić near Bugojno.
  - Duganli Malkoç Bey (Serbo-Croatian: Malkoč-beg Karaosmanović; died 1562 or 1565), sanjakbey of Herzegovina
    - Sons Džafer, Osman, Omer, Ibrahim, Alija, Husein and Hasan.
      - Ahmed Pasha Dugalić, beylerbey of Bosnia (1598–99; 1604)

Geneaology unclear

- Balı (died 1514), commander, had two sons, Ali Bey and Tur-Ali Bey, all three died at Chaldiran.
  - Ali Bey (died 1514)
  - Tur-Ali Bey (died 1514)
- Malkoçoğlu Bali Bey, not the same as Yahyapaşazâde Bali Bey (fl. 1485–d. 1527).
- Bâlibey, probably one of the commanders under Grand Vizier Sokollu Mehmed Pasha that participated in the Safavid Campaign (1554–55).
- Yavuz Ali Paşa, Grand Vizier from October 16, 1603 to July 26, 1604. His paternal uncle was Sali Agha, the Janissary agha in Bosnia.

== Legacy ==
There is a Bosnian Muslim epic tradition about an Ottoman hero named Malkoč-bey.

- Malkoçoğlu Cem Sultan, 1969 Turkish action film

== Sources ==
- Finkel, Caroline (2012). Osman's dream: the story of the Ottoman Empire, 1300-1923. Basic Books. ISBN 9780465008506.
- Yürekli, Zeynep (2016) [2012]. Architecture and Hagiography in the Ottoman Empire: The Politics of Bektashi Shrines in the Classical Age. Routledge. pp. 119–. ISBN 978-1-317-17941-2.
- Gemil, Tahsin (1991). Românii și otomanii în secolele XIV-XVI. Editura Academiei Române. ISBN 9789732701980.
- Fodor, Pál (2019). "Wolf on the Border: Yahyapaşaoğlu Bali Bey (?-1527)". In Fodor, Pál; Kovács, Nándor Erik; Péri, Benedek (eds.). Şerefe. Studies in Honour of Prof. Géza Dávid on His Seventieth Birthday. Budapest: Research Centre for the Humanities, Hungarian Academy of Sciences. pp. 57–87.
