= Laskaris Kananos =

15th-century Greek traveler

Laskaris Kananos (or Lascaris Cananus) was a 15th-century Greek traveler to northern Europe who left an account in Medieval Greek of his travels.

Kananos may have traveled in 1438–1439 (possibly in connection with the Council of Florence), or he may have been traveling in 1468 collecting alms for the release of prisoners from the Ottoman Empire. Although he has at times been identified with John Kananos, there is no reason other than their surnames to equate the two obscure figures.

Judging by his interest in the silver coinage minted in Stockholm and the barter trade in Bergen, Kananos may have been a merchant. Besides Stockholm and Bergen, he visited Norway, Schleswig, Copenhagen, Pomerania, Danzig, Prussia, Livonia, Latvia and England, whence he sailed to Iceland.

Kananos' surviving account is short, just three pages in the sole surviving manuscript of the 16th century (now in Vienna, Austrian National Library, hist. gr. 113, at folios 174r–175r). It may be a fragment of a once longer work. The Baltic Sea he calls the Venedicos Kolpos ("Wendish Bay"). He noted the subordination of Sweden and Norway to the king of Denmark in the Kalmar Union, since the king lived in Kupanava (Copenhagen). He noted that the cities of Riga and Revel belonged to the Archbishop of Riga and the rest of Livonia to the duke of the grand master of the Teutonic Order. He refers to Iceland as inhabited by "fish-eaters" (ichthyophagoi) and identifies it with the Thule of Claudius Ptolemy.
