= Serbia Expedition (1477) =

- Part of the Hungarian–Ottoman Wars
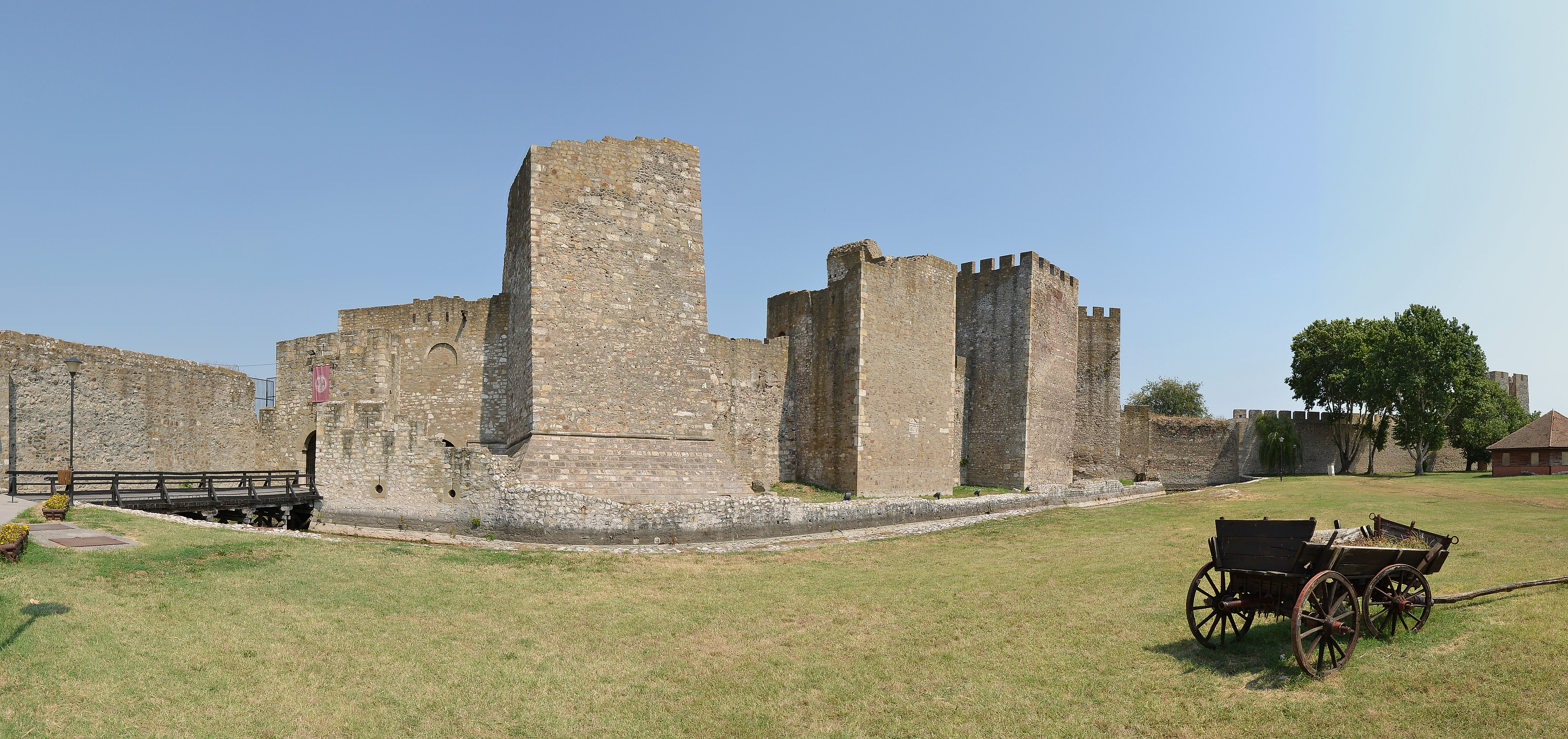
- Smederevo Castle
Date	January 1477
Location	Serbia, Danube River, Smederevo
Result	Ottoman victory: The Ottomans captured the Haram Ram and Koyluca Kulič fortresses built by the Hungarians

Belligerents
Ottoman Empire	Kingdom of Hungary

Commanders and leaders
Mehmed II; Koca Davud (WIA); Mihaloğlu Ali Bey; Skander Pasha	Unknown

Strength
20,000	3,000 garrisoned 26,000 army in the region

Casualties and losses
500	1,100 in total: 500 dead; 600 prisoner; Some Hungarian ships were captured.

The Serbia Expedition was the expedition of Sultan Mehmed II to Hungary in 1477 after his Moldavian campaign.

== Background ==
While the Ottoman army was crossing the Danube after the Moldavian campaign, news came from Mihaloğlu Ali Bey that the Hungarians had built two castles at the junction of the Danube and Sava rivers and on the right bank of the Danube.

Matthias Corvinus returned to his capital after strengthening these forts and surrounding them with moats. However, the right bank of the Danube belonged to the Ottomans. There, on the right bank of the new Sava river, the Ottomans had built the Šabac Fortress in 1470. Hungarian king Matthias took it four years later.

Sultan Mehmed considered it necessary to prevent this situation immediately. He came to Edirne during winter, something the Hungarians did not believe he would do.

== Expedition ==
According to Matthias Corvinus, the guards consisted of 3,000 men, while there were also 26,000 Hungarian soldiers stationed in the region. These forces were constantly ravaging Ottoman territories and keeping Semendire under threat.

Sultan Mehmed II did not delay and, only ten days after returning from the Moldavian campaign, set out on campaign with 20,000 men, despite the fact that his soldiers were tired. Davud Pasha was sent ahead as the vanguard and launched the first attack. However, this attack wounded Davud Pasha and caused him to lose 500 soldiers.

When the Sultan’s army arrived at Smederevo, it repelled several attacks and the garrisons of the two Hungarian forts around the city fled. However, those in the third fortress stood firm and suffered 500 casualties as a result of the Ottoman attack. Mehmed besieged the fort, but he knew that he could not continue the siege for a long time due to the harsh winter conditions. He had his soldiers cut down trees and had these fill in the ditch up to the level of the walls. Respecting the promise of safe passage, the garrison agreed to surrender as Mehmed prepared to burn the timber he had piled up to set the castle on fire.

Mihaloğlu Iskender Bey went to negotiate with the commanders of the fortress in order to hold peace talks.
