= Battle of Zvornik (1464) =

Battle of the Hungarian–Ottoman Wars

Battle of Zvornik/siege of Zvornik
- Part of the Hungarian–Ottoman Wars; Ottoman wars in Europe
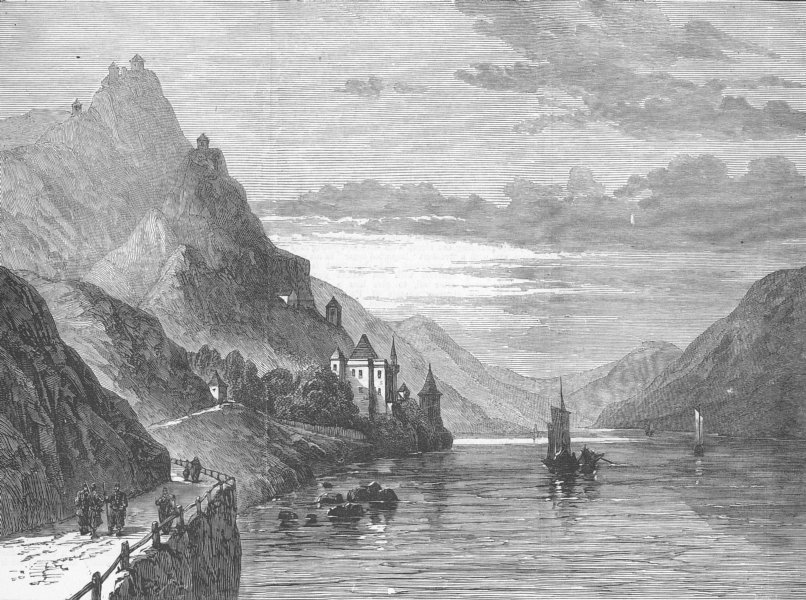
- Zvornik district and its view
Date	October–November, 1464
Location	Zvornik, Ottoman Bosnia and Herzegovina
Result	Ottoman victory

Belligerents
Ottoman Empire	Kingdom of Hungary

Commanders and leaders
Mahmud Angelović; Mihaloğlu Ali Bey; Skender Pasha; Ömer Bey	Matthias Corvinus; Emeric Zápolya (WIA)

Strength
500 (Garrison); 40,000 (siege relief army)	30,000 (17,000 cavalry, 6,000 infantry, 7,000 crusaders)

Casualties and losses
Very small	Many soldiers and prisoners

Battle of Zvornik or siege of Zvornik took place during the second Bosnian campaign of Mehmed the Conqueror in 1464.

== Background ==
In 1464, Sultan Mehmed moved to Bosnia for the second time. The sultan tried to take the castle of Jajce, wanting to besiege and destroy it, but could not. The aim of the Hungarian king who came to Bosnia during the siege of this place was to pull Sultan Mehmed on himself and save the Jajce castle from siege. The Hungarian king also began to besiege the Zvornik castle. However, the Ottoman ruler both besieged the Jajce castle and sent forces against the King.

== Battle ==
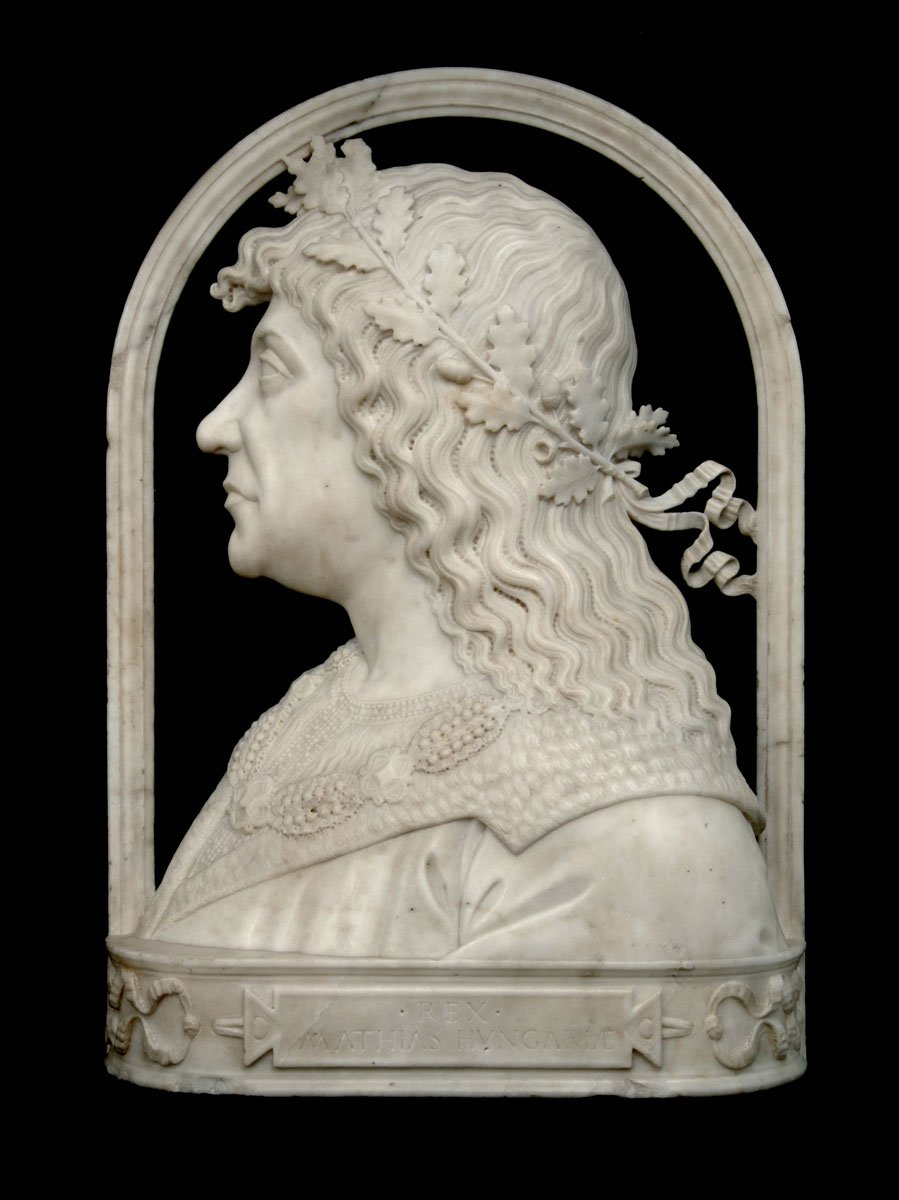
Portrait of Matthias Corvinus

Some Ottoman soldiers had secretly reached the castle, and these soldiers told the castle guards that Mahmud Pasha was on the way and coming to support them. When this news reached the people in the castle, they celebrated. However, this did not have a positive effect on the Hungarians. In fact, the Hungarian army was not in good shape because of the fierce winter. Moreover, they had to deal with fighting a fresh contingent of Turkish troops. Regardless, they attacked the castle again, which was unsuccessful. On the other hand, Mahmud Pasha hurriedly sent the raiders under the command of Mihaloğlu Ali Bey to Zvornik. When the Hungarian army saw these, they informed the King but in the face of Ali Bey's small forces, the large Hungarian army began to withdraw in an irregular manner leaving all their guns and rifles. Ali Bey's raiders then attacked the Hungarian camp.

Mahmud Pasha's forces also came and participated in the battle and had followed the Hungarian army to the Sava river. The material losses of the Hungarian army, which suffered a great defeat, were higher, as well as the human casualties, including the dead and captives.

== Aftermath ==
It was only at the end of November, with great difficulty, that King Matthias succeeded in getting the rest of his army safely to Hungary. The country, which was almost completely destroyed, remained in Ottoman hands except for Jajce, a few important centers occupied by the Hungarians.

== Sources ==
- Pálosfalvi, Tamás (2018). From Nicopolis to Mohács: A History of Ottoman-Hungarian Warfare, 1389–1526. The Ottoman Empire and Its Heritage: Politics, Society and Economy 63. Leiden: Brill. ISBN 978-90-04-37565-9.
