= Malkoçoğlu Bali Bey =

Ottoman commander and governor

- Born: 1495; Sanjak of Bosnia
- Died: 1548 (aged 52–53); Buda, Budin Eyalet, Ottoman Empire
- Relatives: Malkoçoğlu family
- Military career
- Allegiance: Ottoman Empire
- Rank: Beylerbey
- Nickname: Malkoç Bey
- Conflicts: Battle of Mohács

Malkoçoğlu Bali Bey (fl. 1495–1548), also known as Malkoç Bey, was an Ottoman military commander and governor, he distinguished himself at the Battle of Mohács (1526). He then served as the Beylerbey of Budin Eyalet until 1541. Bali Bey was the commander of akıncı and gazis.

He was portrayed by Cüneyt Arkın in the classic movie series Malkoçoğlu, and actor Burak Özçivit in the Turkish television period drama, Muhteşem Yüzyıl (2011–14).

== Bibliography ==
- Yürekli, Zeynep (2016) [2012]. Architecture and Hagiography in the Ottoman Empire: The Politics of Bektashi Shrines in the Classical Age. Routledge. p. 119. ISBN 978-1-317-17941-2.
