= John Cananus =

Byzantine Greek historian

John Cananus or John Kananos (Greek: Ἰωάννης Κανανός) was a Byzantine Greek historian who lived during the first half of the 15th century.

Cananus wrote a "a vivid eyewitness account" of the failed siege of Constantinople by the Ottomans under Sultan Murad II in 1422. He attributes the survival of the Byzantine capital to the miraculous intervention of the Mother of God on 24 August, when he says even the Ottomans saw her on the ramparts. Cananus account is precise in its chronology and useful to military historians for his descriptions of Ottoman siegecraft and Byzantine defences.

The account differs from the contemporary history of John Anagnostes, who described Murad's sack of Thessalonica in 1430, chiefly in Cananus' frequent religious polemic and in his willingness to write in the vernacular Greek, as opposed to the Atticism of Anagnostes and Critobulus. Their use of Greek, while "artificial in the extreme," is intended as an "imitation of the classics", an ideal which had been "the governing principle for all writers who aimed at a good style not merely under the Roman empire but right to the end of the Byzantine period." With conventional humility, Cananus apologizes for his deficient education and poor style. He states that he writes for ordinary people, not scholars. His lexicon is colloquial and includes quite a few Western military terms.

John Cananus is sometimes identified with Lascaris Cananus, who travelled to Scandinavia and Iceland around 1439, but this is only a guess.

== Editions ==
- Greek ed., with Latin translation, published with Sphrantzes in Corpus Scriptorum Historiae Byzantinae, 1838, p. 457-479. (Immanuel Bekker, ed.) View online.
- Greek ed., with Latin translation by L. Allatius, published in Patrologia Graeca, vol. 156. (Migne, J.P., ed.) View online.
- Lascaris Cananus: Lundström, Vilhelm (ed.) (1902) Laskaris Kananos. Reseanteckningar från de nordiska länderna. Utgifna och kommenterade av Vilh. Lundström. Upsala; Leipzig: Lundequist (Smärre Byzantinska skrifter; 1). (With Swedish Translation) https://archive.org/details/LaskarisKananosReseanteckningarFrnDeNordiskaLnderna
- Lascaris Cananus: Jerker Blomqvist 2002. The Geography of the Baltic in Greek Eyes. In Noctes Atticae: 34 articles on Graeco-Roman antiquity and its Nachleben. 36–51. Copenhagen: Museum Tusculanum. https://books.google.com/books?id=y37hozj-PeIC&dq=iceland+kananos&pg=PA38
- Online translation into Russian via German: Georg Jakob. Arabische Berichte von Gesandten an germanische Furstenhofe aus dem 9. und 10. Jahrhundert. Berlin 1927, pp. 46–47. http://vostlit.by.ru/Texts/rus8/Kananos/text.htm%5B%5D
- Online translation into Russian: А. А. Васильев. Ласкарь Канан, византийский путешественник XV века по Северной Европе и в Исландию. Харьков, 1914. pp. 3–8. https://web.archive.org/web/20110727041740/http://miriobiblion.narod.ru/kananos/kananos.html
- Online translation into English: https://hellenisteukontos.blogspot.com/2009/09/lascaris-cananus-updated.html
