= Süleymanname =

Manuscript detailing illustrations of the life and achievements of Suleiman I

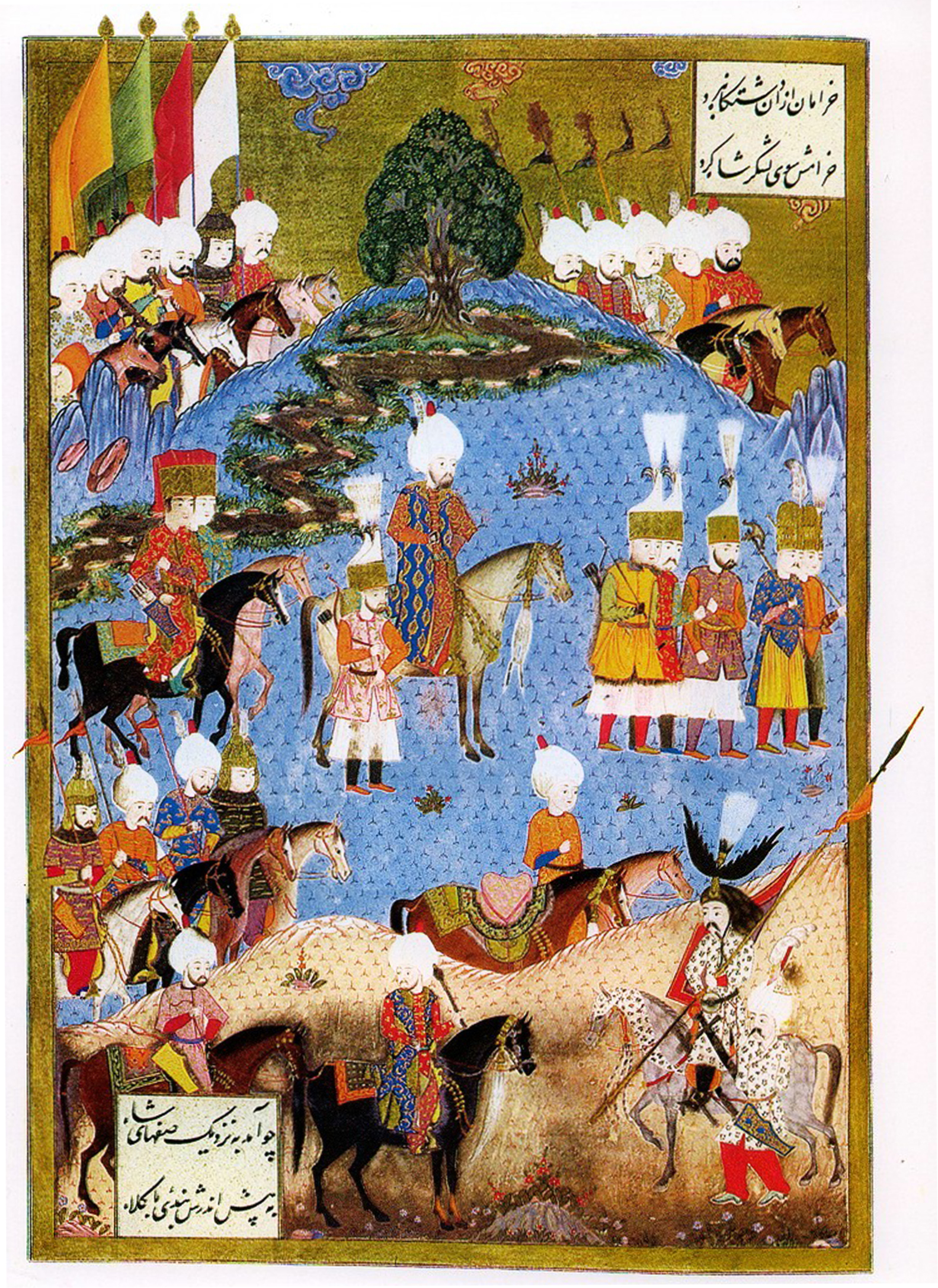
Suleiman marching with his army in Nakhichevan, summer 1554, during the Ottoman-Safavid War of 1532–1555. One of the scenes of the Süleymannâme.

The Süleymannâme (or Sulaiman-nama; lit. 'Book of Suleiman', Topkapı Palace Museum Manuscript Library, TSMK H.1517, completed circa 1558) is an illustration of Suleiman the Magnificent's life and achievements. In 65 scenes the miniature paintings are decorated with gold, depicting battles, receptions, hunts and sieges. Written by Fethullah Arifi Çelebi in Persian verse, and illustrated by five unnamed artists, the Süleymannâme was the fifth volume of the first illustrated history of the Ottoman dynasty. It was written in the manner of the Iranian Shahnameh epic. The original version of the Süleymannâme lies in the Topkapi Palace Museum in Istanbul and there is another manuscript in Astan Quds Razavi, the manuscript numbered as manuscript 4249 in Astan Quds Razavi library.

It is an account of Suleiman's first 35 years of his reign as ruler from 1520 to 1555. The portrayal of Suleiman's reign is idealized, as it not only includes the last exceptional events in world history, but also ends the timeline begun at creation with this perceived perfect ruler. The manuscript itself measures 25.4 by 37 centimeters and has 617 folios. In addition, it is organized in chronological order. This manuscript had a much more private use compared to other pieces of art produced for the Ottoman elite. The Süleymannâme has 69 illustrated pages since four topics out of the 65 represented are double-folio images. The cultural and political context of this work is Persian. This work is important because it allows for the acceptance of the sultan presenting himself in a divine image as well as presenting the ideas and expectations of the court. Arifi wrote in this epic poem 60,000 verses.

== The Şehname (Shahnama) model ==
The Süleymannâme, while a work of art, bore political function as well. The Süleymannâme falls under the Şehname, or "King's Book" category. The primary function of the Sehname type was to document a complete Ottoman history, legitimizing and exalting the patron sultan in the process. They were viewed as symbols of Ottoman court culture. Creators of Şehnames, or "Şehnameci," were salaried appointees; under Suleiman, the creator of "court historiographer" was established, pointing to the courtly and political importance of Şehnameci. Şehnamecis were not considered major historians, rather were recognized for their literary skill; Şehnames called for a melding of historical documentation and literary composition, making them difficult to categorize. The texts had to be approved by the Sultan and court officials (the grand vizier and religious scholars) before they were included. Approval ensured all texts met a high literary standard and accurately matched the content of illustrations. The intense vetting process allowed the sultan and advisors to project a carefully crafted image through the text.

Despite this attention to image, the intended audience for Şehnames were the sultan himself, his court and advisors. Luxury manuscripts were considered valuable collector's items, so they were not intended to leave the palace confines. Often the sultan would have Şehname texts read aloud for a court audience, intending to inspire and educate future Ottoman statesmen. For the Sultan and his circle, Şehnames were intended to reinforce the power and status of the Ottoman Empire. For a broader Ottoman elite, Şehnames were intended to instill and understanding of Ottoman identity. For the general population, Şehnames were intended to symbolize the Sultan's power, evidence of his fulfillment of patronage often associated with and expected of a powerful ruler.

Generally, Şehnames are associated with extravagance and power. In addition to legitimizing the Sultan's reign, Şehnames were commissioned typically during times of turmoil, intended to bolster dynastic prestige and justify the ruler.

== Political function of the Süleymannâme ==
The main purpose of this manuscript was to paint an ideal public image for Sultan Suleiman and his court. It focuses on portraying Suleiman as a military figure, but also serving justice as a ruler. For example, the image of Suleiman's enthronement in the Süleymannâme serves as a way to show Suleiman's military role and having order of the court. The idea of a just leader is exemplified by the numerous paintings of his court receptions with other ambassadors, but also through his compassion for his enemies and showing his power and Ottoman superiority.

Suleiman is likened to previous, legendary rulers and heroes. His deeds are emphasized to compare him to these historical figures and it is because of these deeds he is so great. The similarities between the prophet-kings in the Anbiyanama (Book of Prophets) and Suleiman's worries creates a direct portrayal of Suleiman as one of the aforementioned prophet-kings in the first volume of Arif Celebi's Shahnama-yi Al-i Osman. This portrayal is not meant to devalue the status of the prophets to a sultan; however, it elevates Suleiman's status, especially at a time when his image was suffering. The historical context of this work coincides with Suleiman's failing image due to his old age, but more importantly, his negative image as he had his son, Mustafa, killed in 1553, who was popular with the population. This work can be seen as a move to elevate this ruler's image as his own actions decreased his popularity.

A relationship between Suleiman and God is made which functions in two ways. First, it shows him as the Creator, but also as a divine figure. Second, his position was not only approved by God himself, but he was chosen to rule by God. Adding to Suleiman's religious significance, he is written as the last reformer of religion and depicted as the image of the Perfect Man, only second to the Islamic prophet Muhammad. Certain images in the manuscript were executed as a way to show Suleiman's importance as one of the last religious and political leaders and were all approved by the sultan himself. Some of these images include Suleiman's portrayal as the second Solomon on a gold throne and as a saint with a nimbus surrounding his head. Again, Suleiman's reign is legitimized as divine through the combination of his legacy with the histories of other great rulers from other traditions. With that being said, Arif even goes as far to declare Suleiman's superiority over both past Ottoman and world rulers. Rulers of the past all possessed the right kingly characteristics, but in regards to Suleiman, none of them compared to him. Even in the realms of religion, Suleiman's faith and belief in God surpasses the rest of these rulers. By analyzing the order of volumes in Arif's Shahanama, Arif's main purpose is in placing Suleiman in a special position in world history as it started initially from Creation.

== Artistic production under Suleiman ==
Suleiman's generous, adamant patronage to the arts helped cultivate a golden age of Ottoman culture. Suleiman employed male artists and artisans of European, Islamic, and Turkish origins, which forged a visual language consisting of a synthesis of traditions, particularly in architecture and manuscript production. The Ehl-i Hiref (Community of the Talented), a highly organized group of imperial artisans worked on court commissions. Because of the level of organization of arts production in the court, designs created for the court became part of the arts vocabulary across disciplines.

The Cemaat-i Nakkaşan (Society of Painters), one of the units in the Ehl-i Hiref, was in charge of decorating the manuscripts commissioned for imperial libraries. The unit was hierarchical, with members utilizing styles from across the empire, but particularly Tabriz masters and their trainees between 1520 and the 1540s. Nakkaşane artists strongly influenced the decorative styles of the time, for example, the Saz style composed of naturalistic imagery. The nakkaşane created hundreds of manuscripts consisting of classic tales, poetry, paintings, calligraphy, and illuminations.

Illustrated histories like the Süleymannâme were made to exalt the lives of sultans or the festivities or campaigns of the empire, and became the primary work of the nakkaşane after 1560. Though the Süleymannâme reflects historical events, it is not considered an accurate historical source due to its exaltation of the ruler, being an artistic interpretation of the Ottoman court under Suleiman. These manuscripts were produced for private use by members of the dynasty to emphasize the worthiness of their rule and status.

=== Arif Celebi ===
There is not substantial information on Arif Celebi's life, but the knowledge we have on him comes from biographical stories written by many 16th century writers. His mother was the daughter of the Sufi sheikh and religious scholar Ibrahim Gulseni. Arif Celebi was very close to his grandfather and was said to be dearer to him than Gulseni's own son. Arif Celebi's father, Dervis Celebi, according to other accounts, was a man of Persian elite and Arif states in the Süleymannâme that his father was from the city of Abadan. His father makes an appearance in the Süleymannâme again as an elderly figure where Arif pays respect to his father with lines of appreciation. His family came from a background of religion, intellect and politics. It is not known if he had siblings nor if he was married or if he had children.

Around 1545, Arifi Celebi arrived at the Ottoman court and was commissioned in 1550 to write about the Ottoman dynasty in Persian due to the fact that Suleiman enjoyed the previous verses that Arif Celebi had given him. Arif Celebi's Shahnama was to be used as a means to "create a common culture and a shared imperial identity." For his project, Arif Celebi adopted visual styles from Firdawsi's Shahnama that detailed the mythic history of Iran.

Arif's service in the Ottoman court for Suleiman is said to have started when he arrived to the capital and it is assumed that his arrival correlated with Elkas Mirza's arrival to Istanbul in 1547, a Safavid prince who found refuge with Suleiman. It is mentioned again in the Süleymannâme that his father served the Ottoman Empire as a diplomatic envoy and most likely worked for more than one royal person.

Due to his familial background, it is very probable Arif had a high level of education and he was said to have a great skill in the sciences. He studied with the ulama (learned men), signifying that he got training from many medrese professors. Arif worked in both Turkish and Persian, but viewing the several verses he wrote, Persian was more his forte.

Looking at the art that was produced under him, he was more than just a mere writer who ignored the illustrations of his work. He made many choices thematically and stylistically in the illustrations to accompany his writing instead of assigning what to be painted. Despite this, he still had to adhere to the opinions of both Suleiman and some of the members of his court. What we know of his skill in the arts mainly comes from his time as sehnameci. Some other works we can credit to Arif is the Ravzat al-Usak and his drafts for the Imperial Scroll. In addition, he is associated in creating an epic of 2,000 stichs about Hadim Suleyman's Pasa's expedition to India.

== The illustrations ==
The Süleymannâme is a product of careful collaboration between artists and writers. The rendering of images is suggestive of one hand due to overall visual uniformity. The illustrations generally prioritize concentrated, opaque pigments over light washes of color. Featured colors are often unorthodox and fantastical, including pinks, purples, bright blues and greens. Present throughout the manuscript are detailed geometric motifs, most visible on buildings, textiles and in evocations of grass, water and ground. The work exhibits fine detail and precision and crisply drawn lines. To promote the storytelling nature of the book, the illustrations often feature registers to break up sections of the composition; one section may be devoted to an enemy group and another to the Ottomans themselves, for example.

Animals in the Süleymannâme vary between being depicted with traditional colors and being depicted with outlandish colors. In "Death of Huseyin Pasa," the horses are more naturalistic, painted in primarily black and brown. On the contrary, "Death of Ahmed Pasa" features a blue speckled horse, a far cry from a horse's actual likeness.

The Süleymannâme features efforts to differentiate between individuals through slight variation in facial features. Often, an attempt to feature a specific figure is made. In "Execution of Prisoners" Suleiman is easily identifiable because he is the largest figure in the image and he is centrally located. Less important figures are rendered more generally, often mirror images of others in their mass, sometimes with minor facial changes. This holds true for depictions of court attendants and larger armies, both of Ottomans and foreigners. Foreigners are typically differentiated by their style of dress. One can tell Ottomans and non-Ottomans apart through their headwear; Ottomans are shown wearing white turbans with red at the top and can be found in every illustration. In "Arrival of the Austrian Ambassadors," Austrians are shown wearing red and maroon caps and in "Death of Kalender," the rebel Kalender and his men are shown wearing white turbans with cinched midsections.

=== Themes and symbolism ===
The significance of the number 10 is prevalent throughout the Süleymannâme in the metaphysical context. This number is used to show Suleiman's significance as a ruler because he was born in the 10th century and was the 10th ruler in his lineage. The decimal system is used as an allegory to show how the time period of the 10th century was time used to prepare for Suleiman's perfection. The reason for the significance of the number ten is because all the numbers preceding it can be increased by one while maintaining its one digit places. Once 10 is reached, it spills over to the other decimal unit, beginning at 0 which is a starting point as well as representing nothingness. This effect of "spilling over" can be seen as another metaphor for water, specifically the movement of waves. The image of a wave can explain the increasing numeric units as well as the numbers becoming one whole, larger unit. Simply put, the relationship of increasing numbers and waves are parallel. Water is a part of the wave and they are all a part of a larger complex of a body of water while separate, smaller numbers create a new, larger number. In addition, a wave and a body of water with its several units is also a representation of God and His existence in every unit. Arif then relates this to Noah and the Great Flood, connecting the decimal system to the gathering of animals pairs and including religious references again.

Many folios in the Süleymannâme include depictions of trees; these depictions are not merely pieces of decoration for the manuscript, but are used as symbols. One purpose of the trees can be as an organizational function. In the folio with the confrontation of both Ottoman and Austrian forces, a tree is painted at the center top of the page. The tree is used as a division of these two sides and, including the rocks at the foot of the tree, identifies the two different fighting sides.

The use of trees is signified in three different ways. One way is the relationship and position of the tree associated with the figure portrayed on the page. Another way is as any anomaly that contrasts with other components of the folio or makes the tree stand out. The more obvious sign given as showing the trees as symbols rather than decoration is references of it in the text.

In many of the folios, the trees are accompanied with water near its roots. This relationship draws the viewer's attention towards the tree and the positioning of these two images aids in this as well. The positioning also incites a connection to be made between the tree and the protagonist on the specific page. In later pages of the manuscript, it is more common to see images of a tree with water accumulated at the foot, as seen in the reception of Queen Isabella and Infant King Stephen.

The specific representation of a tree cut down the middle by water is said to represent death. One such example of this symbol is on the folio with the depiction of the Battle of Güns. An Ottoman cavalry, Turahan Bey, drags a Habsburg soldier. The tree indicates not only the dreary future of this soldier, but also the current state of a dead soldier who is lying right next to the tree.

Many of these trees have a direct association with Suleiman. The symbols behind these trees are likely to represent a cultural aspect of the Ottoman courtly elite, which explains their frequency and link with Suleiman. The tree with water curving at its base is said to depict the Tree of Being. If this is true, again we have another reference to Suleiman and his divinity. If this not the case, nevertheless, the tree's association with life, Creation, and Muhammad is still prevalent.

==== Death ====
The Süleymannâme features various death scenes. These deaths are typically of foreigners in battles against the Ottomans. The death scenes are not overtly gruesome; there is no excess of blood nor extreme brutality done to the body. Rather, the Süleymannâme offers a stylized representation of death. In ‘Death of Canberdi Gazali," Canberdi Gazali falls into the river with a spear being driven into his body. While his facial expression mildly suggests a scream, his body appears as an abstracted form with a spear protruding out and is not represented of a person on the brink of death in anguish. Surrounding him are "followers, dead and dying from their wounds"- while mild spurts of blood are drawn at their sides, it is difficult to distinguish if they are dead or sleeping.

The subject of death itself is often obscured by compositional arrangement. In "Execution of Prisoners" the Ottoman execution of Hungarian war prisoners is showcased, with onlookers including soldiers and officers off in the distance. It is difficult to tell exactly where the prisoners are being executed because the scene is so busy. Distracting elements include the "rich floral patterns" employed and the clusters of surrounding figures. The "Death of Ahmed Pasa," focusing on the slaying of rebel leader Ahmed Pasa by Ayas Mehmed Pasa, also obscures death through a complicated composition. Ahmed Pasa's severed head is not immediately visible and almost blends into the ground it lies on. These scenes of enemy deaths focus their attention on the killers instead of the killed, emphasizing the power the Ottomans held over their enemies through these victories. Similar death scenes include "Death of Kalender" and "Death of Contender Mustafa."

==== Court receptions ====
The Süleymannâme also features scenes of court life, specifically featuring the Ottomans' interactions with ambassadors/foreigners and entertainment within the Ottoman court. In "Arrival of the Austrian Ambassadors," five Austrian envoys discuss with an Ottoman official in an ornately decorated space. The composition is diagonally oriented, giving the scene an uneasy sense. The scene presents the intricacies of court proceedings with foreign ambassadors and promotes a thoughtful, detailed handling of foreign affairs. The "Reception of the Iranian Ambassador" highlights the "superiority of the Ottoman sultan over his opponents" as an inscription above the throne declares "the Sultan, the shadow of God," likening Suleiman to godlike figure. This superiority is further emphasized through registers, as Suleiman and his advisors are in a higher quadrant than the Safavid ambassadors.

Illustrations are also utilized to outline political proceedings and court practices within the Ottoman Empire. In "Meeting of the Divan," Ottoman scribes, viziers, translators and a variety of courtly officials are shown inside the structure their court meetings were held in. The Divan was the "highest administrative organ of the state," of which the sultan was the head. Depicted in a bird's eye view, all proceedings inside and outside the Divan are on display, providing transparency into specific happenings within the court.

Additionally, scenes showcase lavish celebrations, some specifically held for Suleiman; in "Suleiman Entertained," the officials of Edirne are holding a lavish banquet in Suleiman's honor, where he is shown in the presence of musicians, singers, dancers and courtly officials. Suleiman is portrayed as a powerful ruler worthy of praise and celebration, and the Ottomans are portrayed as prestigious enough to throw large scale banquets.

==== Conquest and combat scenes ====
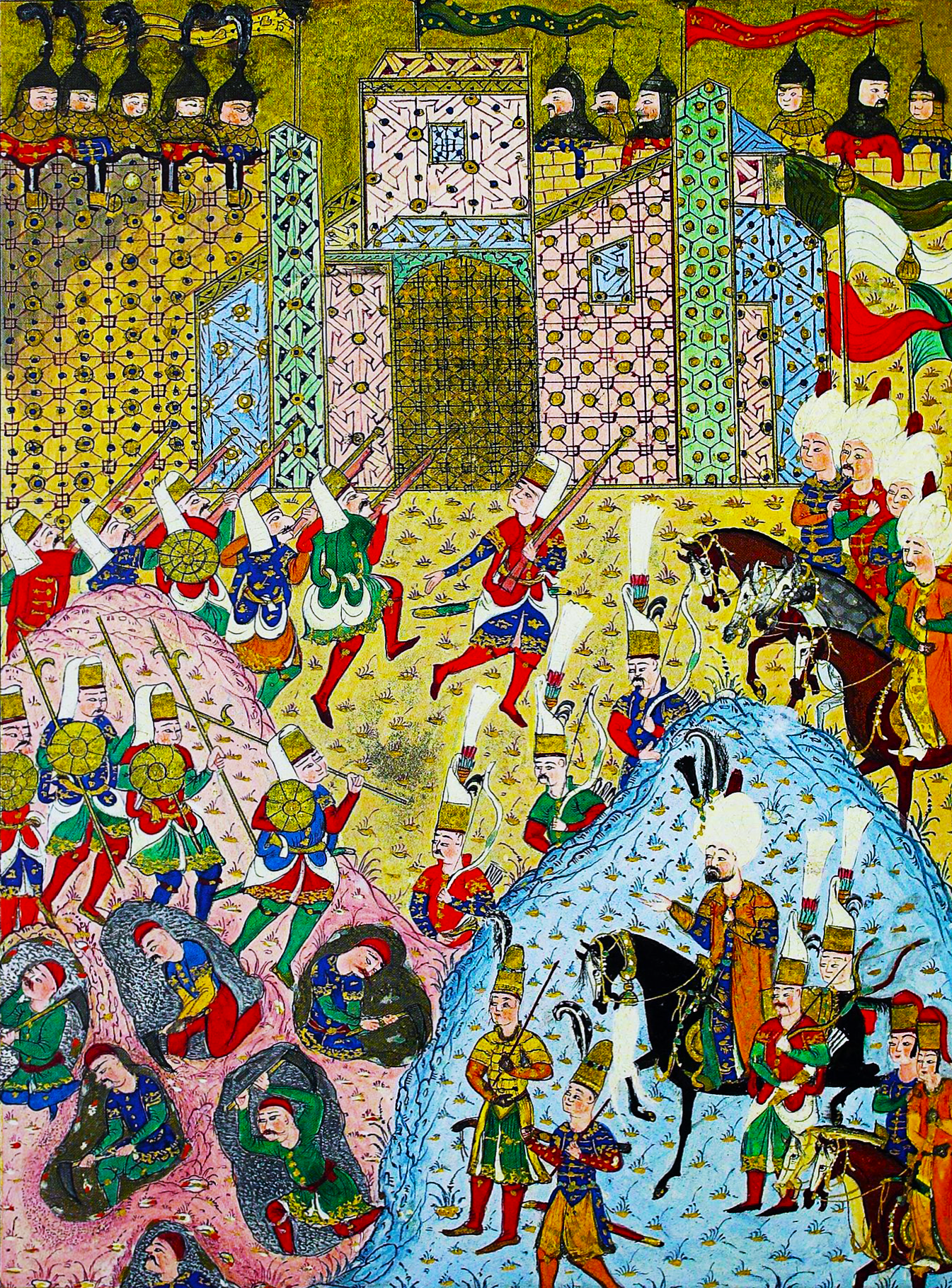
Sultan Suleiman (bottom-right) during the Siege of Rhodes

Of the 69 paintings in the Süleymannâme, about a dozen are scenes of combat ensued by Suleiman's territorial conquests. Though there are stylistic differences between painters because they were made by different artists, each captures a specific "psychological symbolism" of the various events that ultimately display the Ottoman perspective and the power of Suleiman.

"Siege of Belgrade" emphasizes the grandness of the Ottoman camp through geometric decoration of the tents and barriers on the left half image, with the Sultan sitting enthroned and surrounded by a decorative tent. His soldiers also solemnly gaze at the destruction of Belgrade, where clusters of men lament their losses. The composition of the right image is cluttered by architecture and trees, whereas the left scene of the Ottoman army indicates a vegetal landscape with only a few trees and a simple hill incline. This image accurately portrays the events of Belgrade, however, the actions of the individuals and the overall composition are also symbolic. The clutter of the right scene is meant to indicate chaos, contrasted by the success and regal attitude of the sultan are communicated in the left scene.

"Siege of Rhodes" by shows the valiance of the Ottoman army despite the losses they suffered. Historically, this was the battle in which Suleiman suffered the most losses of any attempted siege. In the "Fall of Rhodes", the Ottoman army celebrates their victory while the Suleiman looks on the scene solemnly. Here, the artist perpetuates the stoic leadership of the sultan. Despite the violence of these scenes, renders highly decorative landscapes.

Each scene of conquest in the Süleymannâme emphasizes the sultan's eminence and leadership. He is often the overseer of events rather than being truly engaged the action itself, even when he is surrounded by chaos, such as in "Battle of Mohacs". The artists make specific choices about how rigid or limber the figures should be depicted in order to capture the emotional energy of the scenes.

==== Exalting the sultan ====
There are a few scenes in the Süleymannâme which specifically aim to point to moments of the sultan's greatest accomplishments or glorifications. In these paintings, the sultan's magnificence is emphasized both by the context of the scene and through the compositional and decorative choices of the painters.

"Accession Ceremonies", illustrates the ceremonial, yet casual atmosphere of the new sultan's court. The gold throne, highly decorated geometric motifs of the walls and ceiling, communicate the importance of his position. The attitudes of the different groups of people communicate their class or position: the visitors outside are more dynamically rendered, whereas the indoor groups of courtiers are still, almost static to represent the highly regulated court life. Regardless of status, these individuals are clearly present for the leader, the sultan, further emphasizing his importance.

Several of the scenes exalting Suleiman show him receiving symbolic gifts. In "Receiving the Crown of Hungary", Suleiman is handed the crown of Hungary, a ceremonial act. "Suleiman Presented with the Ruby Cup" shows Suleiman receiving the ruby cup of Cemşid, a mystical symbol of Ottoman power. Here, the painter exemplifies the glory and honor symbolized by receiving the cup through grand decorative elements of the architecture and the central positioning of the sultan. Overall, these exaltation scenes show the ruler as a figure to be honored by many, worthy of the glory of his title and power.

== Sources ==
- Atil, Esin (1986). Suleymanname: The Illustrated History of Suleyman the Magnificent. H.N. Abrams. p. 271. ISBN 978-0894680885.
- Grabar, Oleg (1989). Muqarnas: An Annual on Islamic Art and Architecture. Brill Archive. ISBN 978-9004090507.
- Smith, Charlotte Colding (2015). Images of Islam, 1453–1600: Turks in Germany and Central Europe. Routledge. ISBN 978-1317319634.
