= Mihaloğlu İskender Pasha =

- Mihaloğlu İskender Paşa
- Died: November 1504
- Military career
- Allegiance: Ottoman Empire
- Service years: 1476–1504
- Conflicts: Ottoman–Wallachian wars; Battle of Buzău; Ottoman wars in Europe; Battle of Pozazin; Ottoman–Venetian War (1463–1479); Battle of Zvornik (1464); Serbia Expedition (1477); Battle of Isonzo (1477); Moldavian-Ottoman Wars; Battle of Cătlăbuga; Ottoman–Mamluk War (1485–1491); Siege of Kayseri (1490)

Mihaloğlu İskender Pasha (Turkish: Mihaloğlu İskender Paşa, Serbo-Croatian: Skender-paša Mihajlović; fl. 1478–1504), also known as Skender Pasha, was the sanjakbey of the Bosnian Sanjak during 1478–1480, 1485–1491 and 1499–1504. A Mihaloğlu family member, descendant of Köse Mihal, he and his brother Ali Bey (the sanjakbey of Smederevo) held notable offices in Rumelia (the Balkans).

== Life ==
=== Origin ===
He was member of the Mihaloğlu family which descended from Köse Mihal. His brother was Ali Bey Mihaloğlu.

=== Career ===
In 1476 Skender Pasha joined up with his brother Ali Bey, the sanjakbey of Smederevo, as he departed from Smederevo and crossed the Danube ahead of 5,000 spahis making a second attempt to reach Temesvár. Ali Bey was confronted by the Hungarian nobility at Pančevo. The Ottomans suffered an utter defeat and barely escaped in a small boat. The Hungarians chased Ali Bey into the valley on the opposite bank of the Nadela where they liberated all the previously captured Hungarian prisoners and also took 250 Ottoman captives.

He was the sanjakbey of Bosnia in 1478–1480, 1485–1491 and 1499–1504.

In 1499 he captured part of the Venetian territories in Dalmatia. Around 1500 he built a tekke (Islamic religious institution) of the Naqshbandi order in Sarajevo, capital of Bosnia. In 1501 he unsuccessfully besieged Jajce and was defeated by János (Ivaniš) Corvin, assisted by Zrinski, Frankopan, Karlović and Cubor.

=== Family ===
He had at least two sons and two daughter:

- Hürrem Pasha, beylerbey.
- Mustafa Pasha. In 1508 he married Kamerşah Sultan, daughter of Şehzade Ahmed and Sultan Suleiman I's cousin.
- Mihrişah Hatun. She married Yakub Agha.
- Hafsa Hatun. She married Mustafa Bey, beylerbey of Nigbolu. They had at least two children, two daughters:
  - Muhsine Hatun. In 1523, she married Pargali Ibrahim Pasha, Grand Vizier of Sultan Suleiman I and a former slave of İskender's family. They had at least a child, a son named Mehmed Şah Bey (dead in 1539)
  - Fatma Hatun, called also Fati Hatun. She married Çavuş Başi.

== Sources ==
- Bojović, Boško I. (1998). Raguse (Dubrovnik) et l'Empire ottoman (1430-1520): les actes impériaux ottomans en vieux-serbe de Murad II à Sélim Ier. Eds. de l&Association "Pierre Belon". ISBN 978-2-910860-06-6.
- Preto, Paolo (January 2010). I servizi segreti di Venezia. Spionaggio e controspionaggio ai tempi della Serenissima. Il Saggiatore. ISBN 978-88-565-0164-3.

Preceded by ?	Sanjak-bey of Bosnia; 1478–1480	Succeeded by Koca Davud Pasha
Preceded by Ajaz-beg	Sanjak-bey of Bosnia; 1485–1491	Succeeded by Jakub-paša
Preceded by Sinan-paša Borovinić	Sanjak-bey of Bosnia; 1499–1504	Succeeded by Feriz-beg
