= Harmanköy, İnhisar =

Harmanköy
- Village
- Location within Turkey Location within Marmara
- Coordinates: 40°08′N 30°25′E
- Country: Turkey
- Province: Bilecik
- District: İnhisar
- Population (2021): 201
- Time zone: UTC+3 (TRT)

Harmanköy is a village in the İnhisar District, Bilecik Province, Turkey. Its population is 201 (2021). There is a shop and a school which was closed in 2008. Nowadays, that place is used for weddings.

== See also ==
- Harmankaya Canyon Nature Park
