= Mihaloğlu Ali Bey =

Ottoman governor of Smederevo from c. 1462 to 1507

Gazi Alauddin Mihaloğlu Bey
- Alauddin Mihaloğlu
- Born: 1425; Akhisar, Ottoman Empire
- Died: 1507 (aged 81–82); Pleven (present-day Bulgaria)
- Military career
- Allegiance: Ottoman Empire
- Nickname: Ali
- Conflicts: Hungarian-Ottoman Wars; Battle of Baziaș (1460); Ottoman–Wallachian wars; Battle of Târgovişte; Battle of Buzău; Ottoman-Venetian War (1463-1479); Battle of Zvornik (1464); Battle of Otlukbeli; Serbian Expedition (1477); Battle of Isonzo (1477); Siege of Krujë (1478); Siege of Shkodra; Battle of Breadfield

Mihaloğlu Ali Bey or Gazi Alauddin Mihaloğlu Ali Bey, (1425–1507) was an Ottoman military commander in 15th century and the first sanjakbey of the Sanjak of Smederevo. He was one of the descendants of Köse Mihal, a Byzantine governor of Chirmenkia and battle companion of Osman Gazi.

== Career ==
In 1459 he raided Transylvania, province of Hungary but was beaten by the Transylvanian voivode, uncle of King Matthias and former Regent of Hungary Michael Szilágyi at Futak, and thus was forced to retreat.

In 1460 he was able to capture the small advancing army of Szilágyi at Pojejena. He transferred the prisoner to Constantinople to have him decapitated by the orders of the Sultan.

In 1460 Ali Bey became the subasi of the Güvercinlik (Golubac, today in Serbia). During one of his expeditions to Banat in 1460 he captured Michael Szilágyi. Later that year sultan awarded him for this success and appointed him as the sanjakbey of the Sanjak of Vidin. He was appointed as sanjakbey of the Sanjak of Smederevo in 1462/1463.

In 1462, as the bey of Smederevo, he constantly harassed the Torontál County of Hungary but withdrew southwards after the reinforcements of Micheal of Szokoly and Peter of Szokoly arrived into the area.

In 1463 he assisted Mehmet II in his attack on Bosnia with a distraction attack on King Matthias in Syrmia, but was pushed back by Andrew Pongrácz, the high cup-bearer of Hungary. He suddenly made a flanking move into the heart of Hungary and reached Temesvár, where he ran into John Pongrácz, Voivode of Transylvania and was defeated in a close battle.

On 7 February 1474, Ali Bey Mihaloğlu unexpectedly attacked the town of Várad. At the head of his 7,000 horsemen, he broke through its wooden fences and pillaged the town, burned the houses and took the population as prisoners. Their goal was to rob the treasury of the episcopate, but were resisted by the refugees and clergy in the bishop's castle (at the time the bishop's rank was absent, and no records mention the identity of a possible Hungarian captain). The town fell but the castle stood, forcing the Ottomans to give up the fight after one day of siege. While retreating, they devastated the surrounding areas. Mihaloğlu Ali Bey, whose next task was to capture Vlad and kill him, trapped Vlad and his men with 300 Raiders under her command.

In 1476 Ali was joined by his brother Skender Pasha as he departed from Smederevo and crossed the Danube ahead of 5,000 spahis making a second attempt to reach Temesvár. He was confronted by the Hungarian nobility at Pančevo. He suffered an utter defeat and barely escaped in a small boat. The Hungarians chased him into the valley on the opposite bank of the Nadela where they liberated all the previously captured Hungarian prisoners and also took 250 Ottoman captives.

In 1478 he joined Ömer Bey Turahanoğlu when he attacked Venetian possessions.

In 1479 Ali Bey launched his biggest attack on the Kingdom of Hungary. He led his army over the Szászsebes region, pillaged Gyulafehérvár, but was stopped by Pál Kinizsi in the Battle of Breadfield.

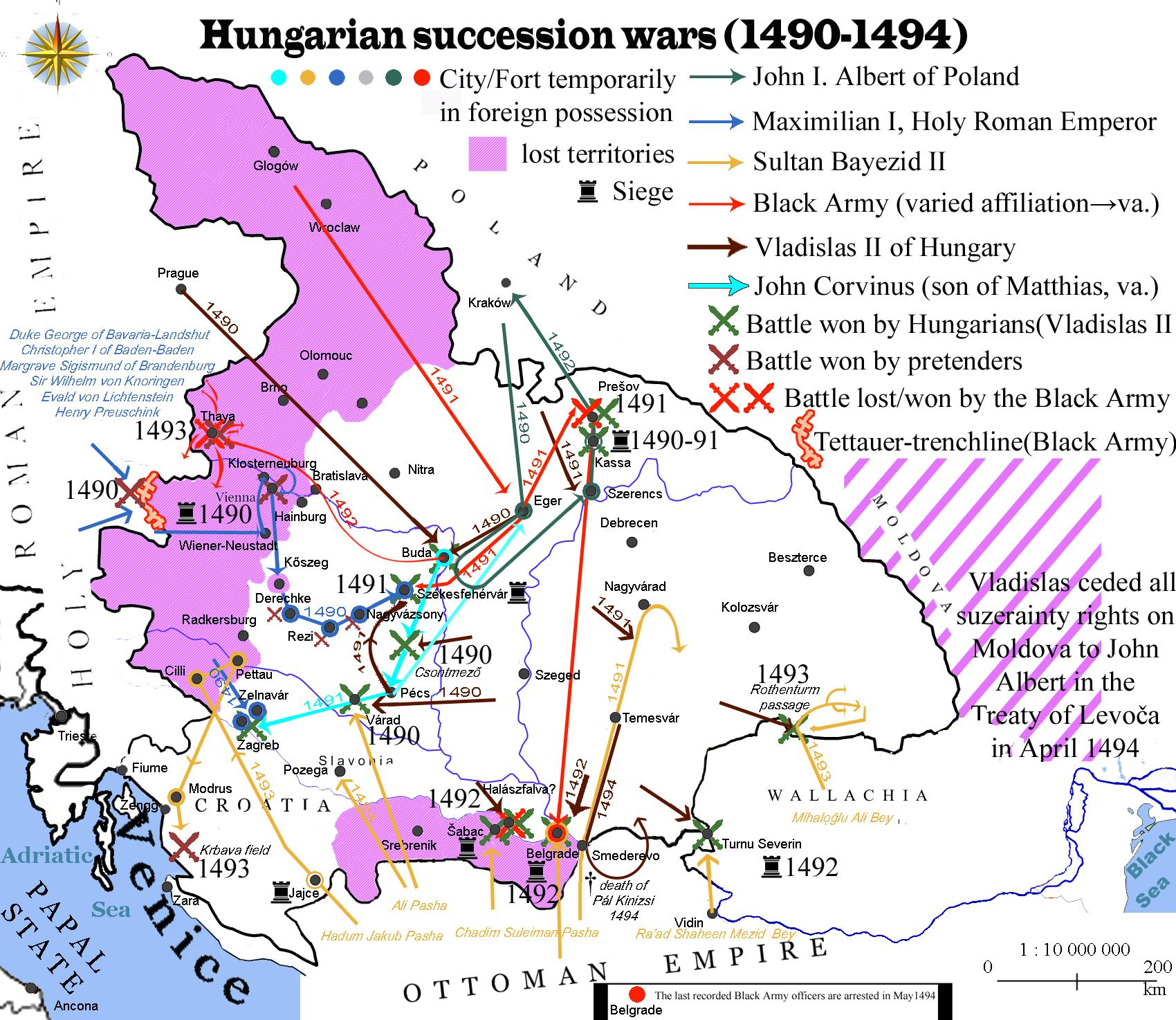
The Transylvanian campaign of Ali Bey Mihaloglu in 1493

By the end of 1492 Wallachian voivode Vlad Călugărul had already warned the Hungarians of a possible Ottoman offensive from Transylvania. In an attempt to dispose the pro-Hungarian voivode, Bayezid II marched through Wallachia to enter into Hungary. They passed through the Rotenturm Pass and turned towards inner Transylvania along the Olt River. At the time the region lacked a legitimate voivode, but the vice-voivode Stephen Telegdi took up arms and blocked the passage to face the unaware Ottomans on their way back. They managed to retake the plunder and captives and caused the Ottoman forces heavy losses (a couple of thousand casualties). However, after the death of his father Vlad, pro-Ottoman Radu IV the Great replaced him in 1495.

== Marriage and issue ==
He married Maria Craiovești, a Wallachian noblewoman daughter of Ban Năgoe, who converted to Islam and took name Mahitab Hatun. They had five sons and a daughter:

- Hasan Bey;
- Ahmed Bey;
- Gazi Mehmed Bey; he had a son, Kasim Bey;
- Gazi Hızır Bey;
- Gazi Kara Mustafa Bey;
- Aynişah Hatun.

== Legacy ==
Some historians believed that the epic figure of Alija Đerđelez was inspired by Ali Bey Mihaloglu.

Mihaloğlu's katib Prizrenli Suzi Çelebi that accompanied him in his battles wrote Gazavatnam Mihaloğlu, a 15,000 line epic poem from which 2,000 survived. Although the poem was intended to be an epic military chronicle, Çelebi infused it with florid language in order to make it as attractive as a lyric one.

Odds are Mihaloglu inspiried American author Robert E. Howard in naming the main antagonist of his story The Shadow of the Vulture Mikhal Oglu despite the story happening 20 years after the historical character's death.

== Sources ==
- Başar, Fahamettin (2005). "Mihaloğulları" (PDF). Islam Ansiklopedisi, Vol. 30 (Misra - Muhammediye) (in Turkish). Istanbul: Turkiye Diyanet Vakfi. pp. 24–25. ISBN 9789753894258.
- Babinger, Franz (1993). "Mīk̲h̲āl-Og̲h̲lu". In Bosworth, C. E.; van Donzel, E.; Heinrichs, W. P. & Pellat, Ch. (eds.). The Encyclopaedia of Islam, Second Edition. Volume VII: Mif–Naz. Leiden: E. J. Brill. pp. 34–35. doi:10.1163/1573-3912_islam_SIM_5193. ISBN 978-90-04-09419-2.
