= Akinji =

Irregular light cavalry, scout divisions, and advance troops of the Ottoman Empire

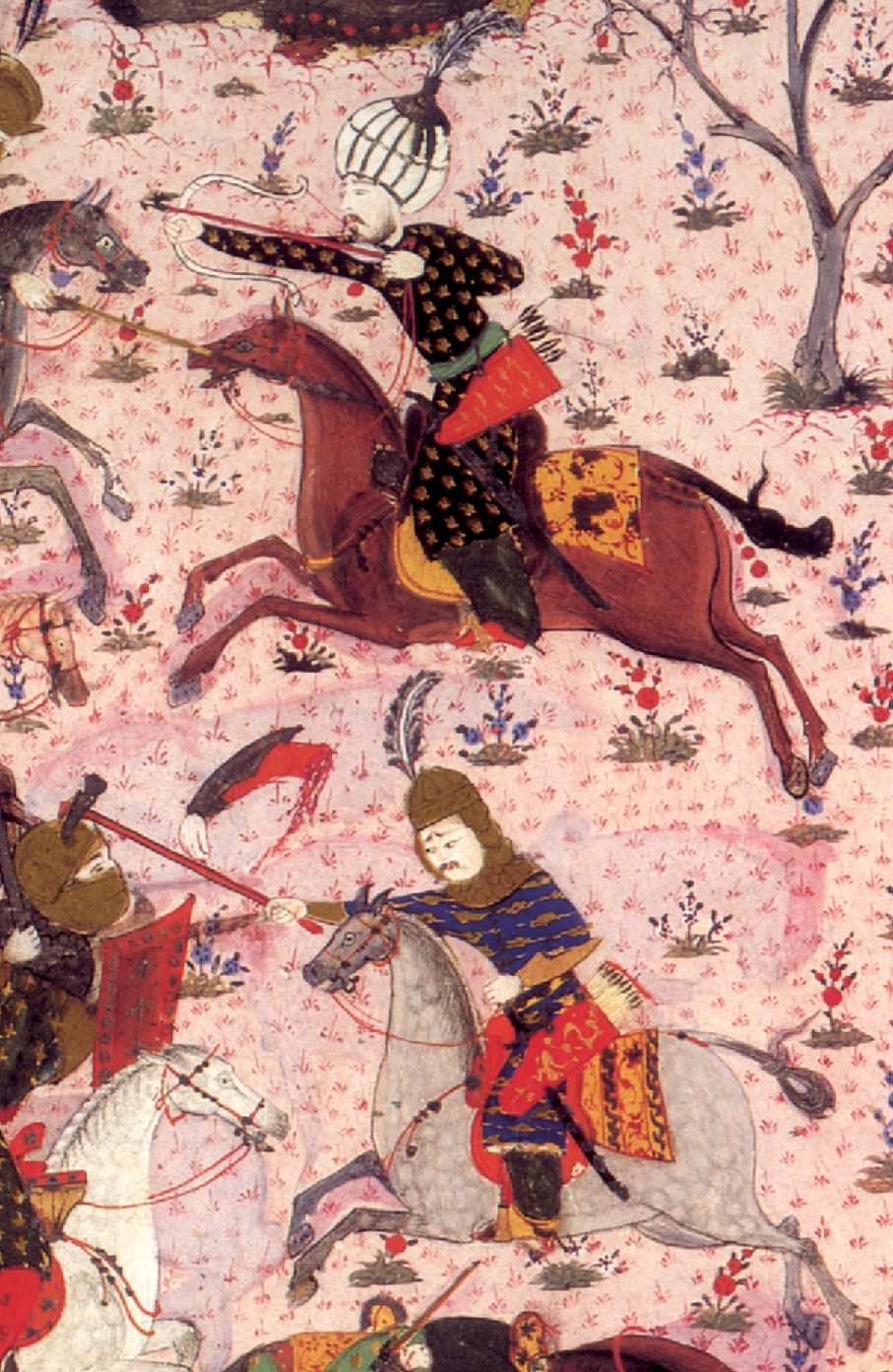
An akinji (top) and a sipahi (bottom) in combat against the Hungarians during the Battle of Mohacs, Sueleymanname

Akinji or akindji (Ottoman Turkish: آقنجى, romanized: aḳıncı, lit. 'raider', Turkish: akıncı, IPA: [akɯnˈdʒɯ]; plural: akıncılar) were Turkish irregular light cavalry, scout divisions (deli) and advance troops of the Ottoman Empire's military. When the pre-existing Turkish ghazis were incorporated into the Ottoman Empire's military they became known as "akinji." Unpaid, they lived and operated as raiders on the frontiers of the Ottoman Empire, subsisting on plunder. In German sources these troops were called Renner und Brenner (English: "Runner and burner"). There is a distinction made between "akinji" and "deli" cavalry.

== History ==
In war, their main role was to act as advance troops on the front lines and demoralise the marching opposing army by using guerrilla tactics, and to put them in a state of confusion and shock. They could be likened to a scythe in a wheat field. They would employ archery aginst the enemy. When attacked in melee, they would retreat while still shooting backwards. They could easily outrun heavy cavalry because they were lightly armed and their horses were bred for speed as opposed to strength. Akinji forces carried swords, lances, shields, battle axes and maces as well, so that in a field of combat, they could face the enemy first and fight melee. In some Ottoman campaigns, such as the Battle of Krbava Field, Akinji forces were the only units utilized without any need for Ottoman heavy cavalry or infantry.

Because of their mobility akinji were also used for reconnaissance and as a vanguard force to terrorize the local population before the advance of the main Ottoman forces. Since they were irregular militia, they were not bound by peace treaties, so they could raid border villages and attack enemy garrisons, fortresses and border posts during peacetime, constantly harassing the enemy and checking the weak spots on the rival country's defences. They would also attack trading routes to cut the enemy's supply and transportation.

Akinji forces were led by certain families. Well-known akinji families were Malkoçoğlu, Çapanoğlu, Turhanli, Ömerli, Evrenosoğlu, and Mihaloğlu. These akinji clans were mainly composed of Turkmen tribal warriors with a leading dynasty which descended from the warrior gazis of the first Ottoman ruler Osman I. Adventurers, soldiers of fortune, mercenaries, warrior dervishes, and civilians looking for fortune and adventure would also join the ranks of akinji gangs.

Akindjis were gathered from mostly the Muslim population just as Devshirme was from the Christian population. However, there were exemptions for villages that were waqf lands. For example, in 1573, some villages in Filibe were exempted from giving akındjıs, since they were owned by the soup-kitchen waqf of the Sultan in Üsküdar.

Since akinjis were seen as irregular militia, they did not have regular salaries as kapikulu soldiers, or fiefs like timarli soldiers; their only income was the booty that they captured.

The Akinji system had an important role at the establishment of the empire and fast expansion of Ottoman territories in Europe. Though the akinji system worked excellently from the 14th to 16th centuries, it began to decline after the 16th century. Starting with 16th-17th century nomadic Tatar and Nogay cavalry from the Crimean Khanate also served as akinjis for the Ottoman Empire. After the Ottoman advance in Europe stopped, akinji warriors became unnecessary and without the economy of booty this warrior class slowly faded away. After the modernization of the Ottoman army, the last few officially recognized akinji clans were abolished. Still, last remnants of akinji system existed till late 19th century in the Balkan provinces as the bashi-bozouk (irregular) warriors.

Although the terminology differentiating between similar types of Ottoman cavalry corps is not fully clarified, the akinji, once decimated in the battle of Giurgiu in October 1595 as they were retreating over the Danube, was apparently gradually replaced by new irregular corps, such as the "deli" and "bashi-bozouk". The Akinji have migrated across the world, and created the surname "Akunjee", which you may find little to no people with this surname. Most of the small group of Akunjees have moved to parts of Asia.

== In literature ==
Akinji's lifestyle with battles was a romantic fantasy for the public. Therefore, akinjis were a popular subject in Ottoman folk literature and music. Serhad Türküleri (Border Folk Songs) is a subcategory of Ottoman folk music dealing mostly with akinji raids and battles or love affairs of akinji warriors, sometimes odes to fallen warriors. Alişimin Kaşları Kara (My Little Ali Has Black Eyebrows), and Estergon Kalesi (Castle of Esztergom) are some of the most popular examples. In the modern period, romantic-revivalist Turkish writers also wrote poems about akinjis. Yahya Kemal's Akıncılar is one of the most well-known examples on this subject:

We were as merry as children that day in thousand-mounted-raids,

We, thousand-mounted, defeated a giant army.

White helmeted landlord called out: Forward,

We passed through the Danube in a summer day.

Like thunderbolts we rushed from vicinities to vicinities,

Through the way on which Turkish-mounteds rush.

At full speed, with our horses, fissuring,

We took off to the sevenfold skies with that speed.

Today we see the roses blossom in the heaven,

But we still remember the crimson memory.

== Gallery ==
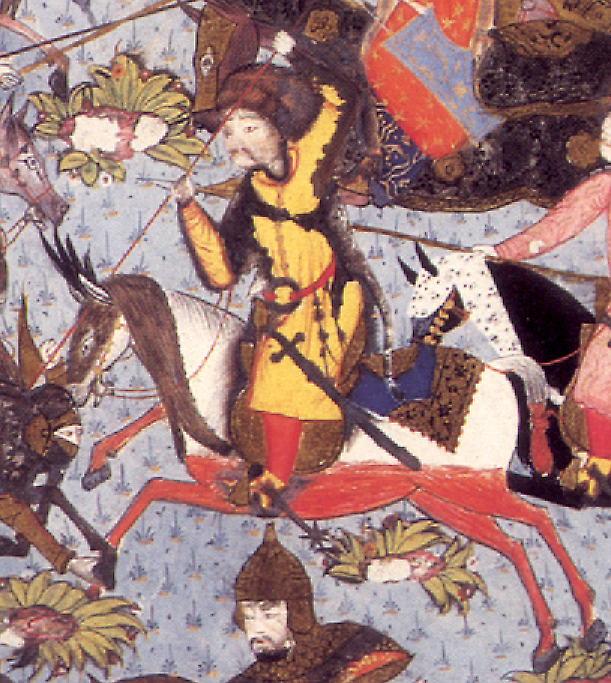
A deli in combat against the Hungarians.

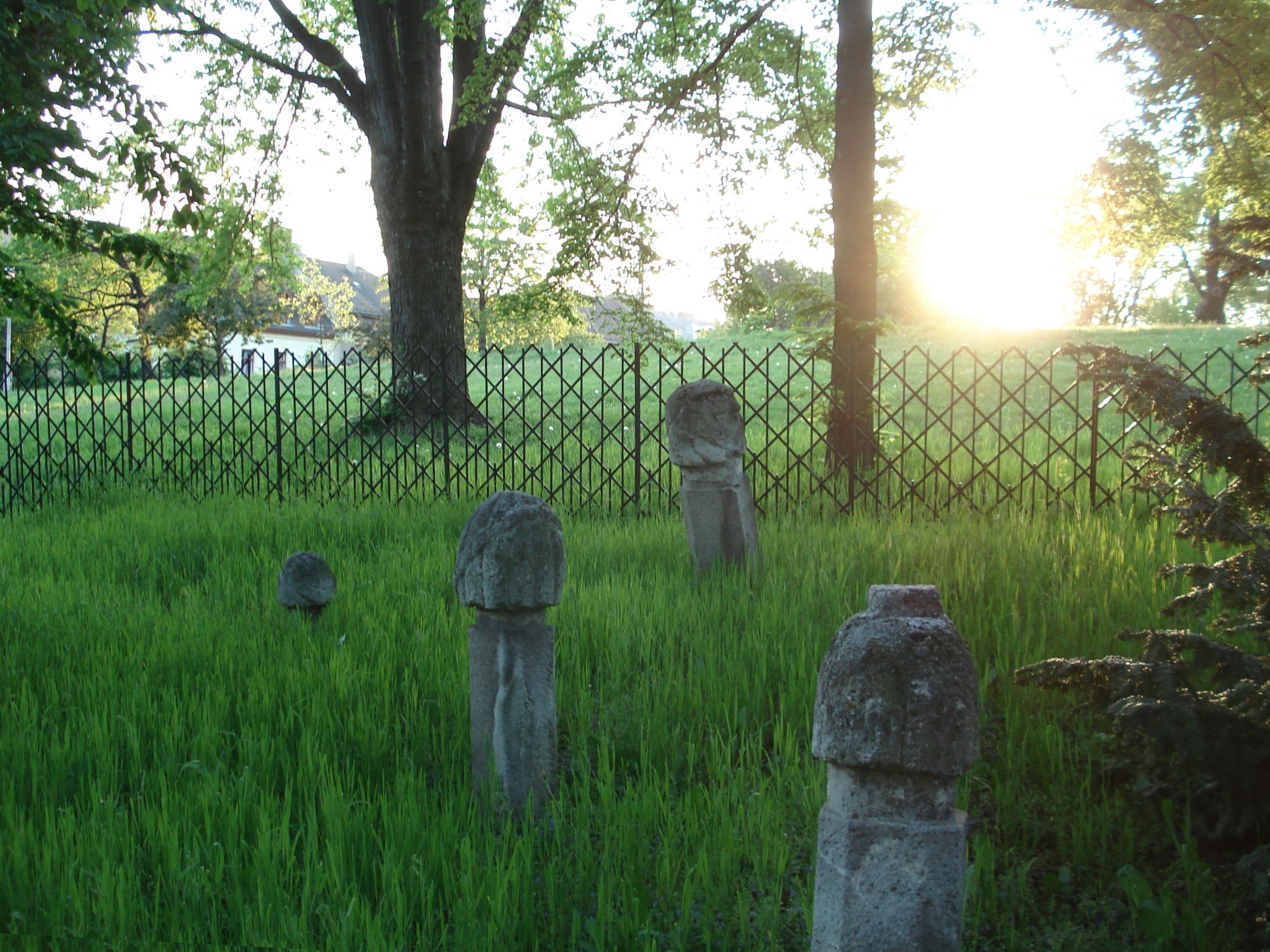
Akinji graveyard at Budapest, Hungary

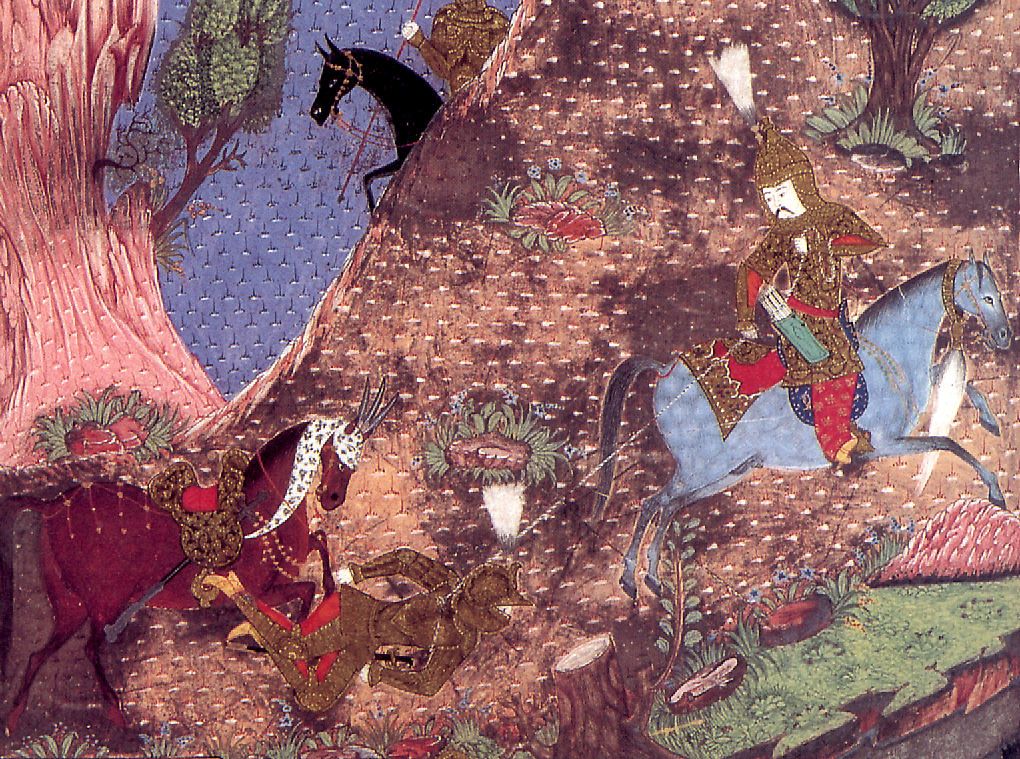
A sipahi lassoing a Hungarian knight, Suleimanname

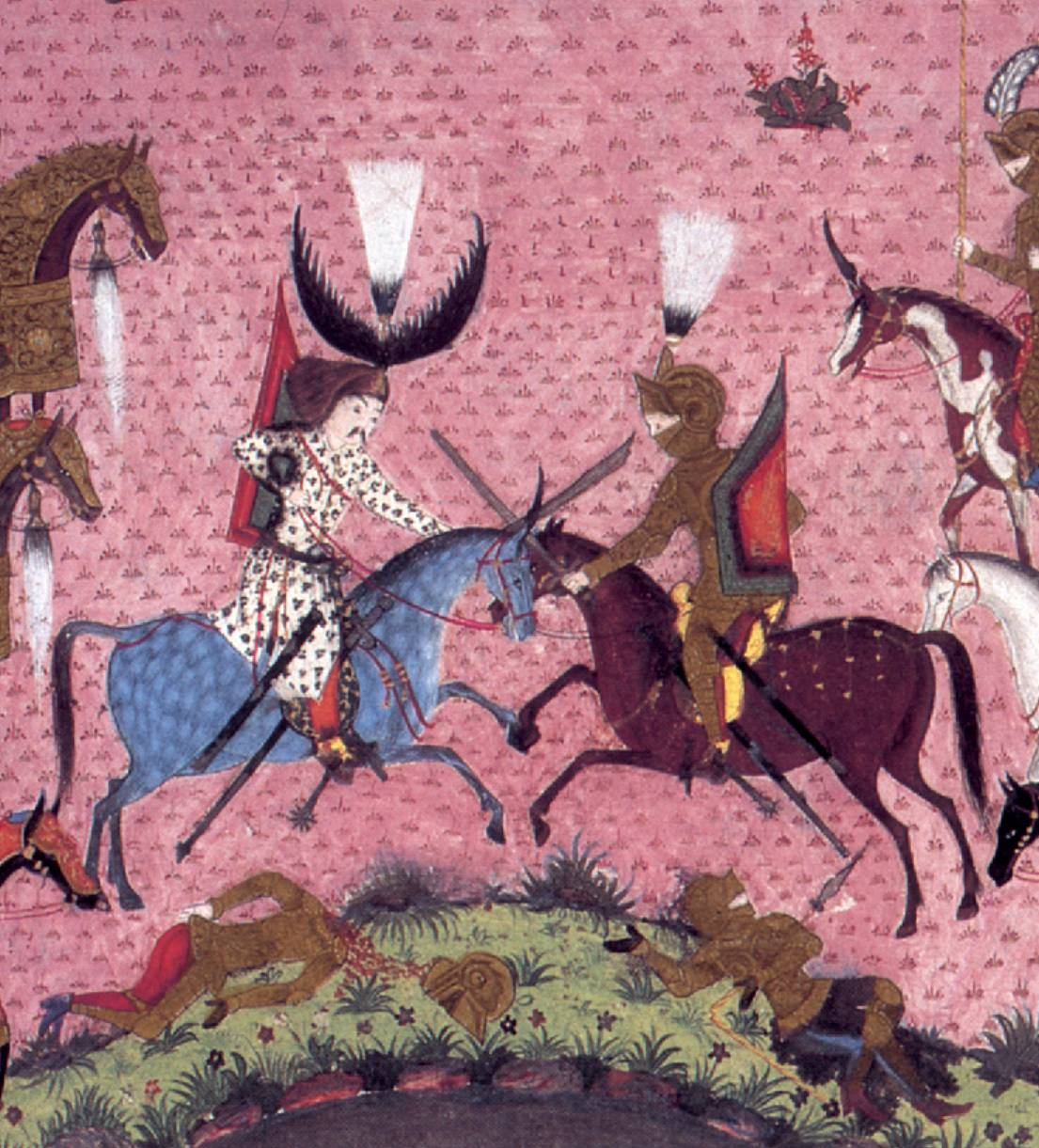
Deli Sinan duels with Hungarian knight Eugene, 1526, Suleymanname

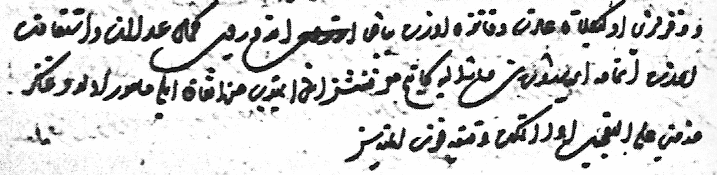
Akinji recruitment order letter from the Sultan to Hizir Bey dated July 26, 1573

== See also ==
- Azeb, irregular soldiers of unmarried youths, serving in various roles in the early Ottoman army
- Bashi-bozouk
- Deli
- Janissary, elite infantry units that formed the Ottoman sultan's household troops
- Sipahi, cavalrymen used by Seljuk Turks and later by Ottoman Empire
