= Sultansuyu Dam =

Dam in Turkey

- Interactive map of Sultansuyu Dam
- Location: Turkey
- Coordinates: 38.3191°N 38.0517°E
- Construction began: 1986
- Opening date: 1992

Dam and spillways
- Height (foundation): 55 feet (17 m)
- Length: 721 metres (2,365 ft)

Reservoir
- Total capacity: 3,205,000 cubic metres (4,192,000 cu yd)
- Surface area: 2.26 square kilometres (0.87 sq mi)

Sultansuyu Dam is a dam built on the Sultansuyu River in Akçadağ, Malatya Province, Turkey. Constructed for irrigation purposes between 1986 and 1992, it was damaged by an earthquake in 2023 and the water was released for safety reasons.

== Structure ==
Sultansuyu Dam is an earthfill dam is 55 feet (17 m) high and 721 metres (2,365 ft) long at the crest and was constructed with a capacity of 3,205,000 cubic metres (4,192,000 cu yd), impounding a lake more than 2 square kilometres (0.77 sq mi) in area. It dams the Sultansuyu River, a right tributary of the Euphrates, in Akçadağ, Malatya Province. It irrigated 17,614 hectares (43,530 acres).

== History ==
Development of the Sultansuyu Dam was backed by the Turkish State Hydraulic Works, to meet irrigation needs. Construction, by a division of Yüksel Holding, began in 1986 and was completed in 1992.

On February 6, 2023, earthquakes in southern Turkey damaged several dams in the region. The Sultansuyu Dam suffered significant lateral cracking; cracks over a meter (3 feet) wide were reported, 400 metres (1,300 ft) long and 2.5–3 metres (8.2–9.8 ft) deep. There was also cracking of the outlet works. Engineers considered the dam to be damaged beyond repair, and it was drained as a precaution. Ceyhun Özçelik of the Muğla Sıtkı Koçman University Department of Water Resources said that the water level in the dam had decreased to a meter and a half. As of 2024, the dam was under detailed investigation to determine how to repair it.

== See also ==
- List of dams and reservoirs in Turkey
