= List of Kuruluş: Osman episodes =

This is a list of episodes from the Turkish TV series Kuruluş: Osman. It is a sequel to Diriliş: Ertuğrul, which premiered in Turkey on 20 November 2019 and is ongoing as of 2020. The show has also been a great success in Albania, where it is the "most watched TV show" in the country. In Albania, the show is called "Osmani". The series has also gained popularity in Pakistan, Bangladesh and India.

== Series overview ==
Season	Episodes	Originally released	
Season	Episodes	First released	Last released
1	27	November 20, 2019	June 24, 2020
2	37	October 7, 2020	June 23, 2021
3	34	October 6, 2021	June 15, 2022
4	32	October 5, 2022	June 14, 2023
5	34	October 4, 2023	June 12, 2024
6	30	October 2, 2024	June 4, 2025

== Episodes ==
=== Season 1 (2019–2020) ===
10 or 15 years (Note: The time gap between Diriliş: Ertuğrul and the start of Kuruluş: Osman is unclear; at one point early in season 1, it is indicated to be around 25 years since the Kayı tribe moved into Söğüt (and Osman was born), while at another, it is implied that Osman is 20-years-old.) after the Berke-Hulagu war, Ertuğrul Gazi goes to Konya and leaves his brother, Dündar Bey, in charge of his tribe. Dündar Bey is easily swain by others into doing their misdeeds, he falls into the trap of the devious Selçuk Sançak Bey, Alişar, and the merciless princess of Kulucahisar, Sofia, who seeks to kill all the Turks. Osman, Dündar's nephew, can see through Alişar and Sofia's plans and warns him about them, despite his refusal to listen. As they continue to build more tension against the Kayı, Geyhatu sends Komutan Balgay to cause more trouble and stop the Kayı, especially Osman, from rebelling against the Mongols. Dündar, who bows down to the Mongols becoming the Sançak Bey, can't see Alişar's anger over his position being given over to him and he believes him when Alişar blames Osman for his son (Batur Alp)'s killing. Soon after, along with the threat from Kulucahisar, Dündar is shown the truth, that Alişar is beheaded by Osman, and Osman has married his love at first sight, Bala. Following this, after many difficulties, Balgay is presumably killed by Osman. While Kulucahisar is conquered by the Kayı, Sofia's death happens in the process.

No. overall	No. in season	Title	Directed by	Written by	Original release date	Turkey viewers (millions)
1	1	"Kuruluş Osman"	Metin Günay	Mehmet Bozdağ, Atilla Engin, Aslı Zeynep Peker Bozdağ and Ozan Bodur	20 November 2019	13.43
2	2	"Kuruluş Vakti (Note: transl. "Time for Establishment")"	Metin Günay	Mehmet Bozdağ, Atilla Engin, Aslı Zeynep Peker Bozdağ and Ozan Bodur	27 November 2019	8.98
3	3	"Kuruluş Ateşi (Note: transl. "The Fire of Establishment")"	Metin Günay	Mehmet Bozdağ, Atilla Engin, Aslı Zeynep Peker Bozdağ and Ozan Bodur	4 December 2019	7.91
4	4	"Vatan Demek (Note: transl. "The Meaning of Homeland")"	Metin Günay	Mehmet Bozdağ, Atilla Engin, Aslı Zeynep Peker Bozdağ and Ozan Bodur	11 December 2019	14.46
5	5	"Kuruluş Destanı (Note: transl. "The Establishment Epic")"	Metin Günay	Mehmet Bozdağ, Atilla Engin, Aslı Zeynep Peker Bozdağ and Ozan Bodur	18 December 2019	12.13
6	6	"Bu Yurt Bizim (Note: transl. "This is our Home")"	Metin Günay	Mehmet Bozdağ, Atilla Engin, Aslı Zeynep Peker Bozdağ and Ozan Bodur	25 December 2019	13.78
7	7	"Kuruluş Osman Vakti (Note: transl. "Time for Kuruluş: Osman")"	Metin Günay	Mehmet Bozdağ, Atilla Engin, Aslı Zeynep Peker Bozdağ and Ozan Bodur	8 January 2020	14.46
8	8	"Türkün Gayesi (Note: transl. "The Turks' Purpose")"	Metin Günay	Mehmet Bozdağ, Atilla Engin, Aslı Zeynep Peker Bozdağ and Ozan Bodur	15 January 2020	9.6
9	9	"Adalet (Note: transl. "Justice")"	Metin Günay	Mehmet Bozdağ, Atilla Engin, Aslı Zeynep Peker Bozdağ and Ozan Bodur	5 February 2020	13.57
10	10	"Şehitler Aşkına (Note: transl. "For the Love of Martyrs")"	Metin Günay	Mehmet Bozdağ, Atilla Engin, Aslı Zeynep Peker Bozdağ and Ozan Bodur	12 February 2020	12.71
11	11	"Türk Demek (Note: transl. "The Meaning of 'Turk'")"	Metin Günay	Mehmet Bozdağ, Atilla Engin, Aslı Zeynep Peker Bozdağ and Ozan Bodur	19 February 2020	14.24
12	12	"Osman Bey"	Metin Günay	Mehmet Bozdağ, Atilla Engin, Aslı Zeynep Peker Bozdağ and Ozan Bodur	26 February 2020	16.87
13	13	"Vatan (Note: transl. "Homeland")"	Metin Günay	Mehmet Bozdağ, Atilla Engin, Aslı Zeynep Peker Bozdağ and Ozan Bodur	4 March 2020	13.21
14	14	"Türk Olmak (Note: transl. "Being a Turk")"	Metin Günay	Mehmet Bozdağ, Atilla Engin, Aslı Zeynep Peker Bozdağ and Ozan Bodur	11 March 2020	12.2
15	15	"Şehitler Ölmez (Note: transl. "Martyrs Don't Die")"	Metin Günay	Mehmet Bozdağ, Atilla Engin, Aslı Zeynep Peker Bozdağ and Ozan Bodur	18 March 2020	17.8
16	16	"Türk Teslim Olmaz (Note: transl. "Turks Don't Surrender")"	Metin Günay	Mehmet Bozdağ, Atilla Engin, Aslı Zeynep Peker Bozdağ and Ozan Bodur	25 March 2020	15.41
17	17	"Yeni Bir Nizam (Note: transl. "A New Order")"	Metin Günay	Mehmet Bozdağ, Atilla Engin, Aslı Zeynep Peker Bozdağ and Ozan Bodur	1 April 2020	10.44
18	18	"Bir Olacağız (Note: transl. "We Will Be One")"	Metin Günay	Mehmet Bozdağ, Atilla Engin, Aslı Zeynep Peker Bozdağ and Ozan Bodur	22 April 2020	9.92
19	19	"Başaracağız (Note: transl. "We Will Succeed")"	Metin Günay	Mehmet Bozdağ, Atilla Engin, Aslı Zeynep Peker Bozdağ and Ozan Bodur	29 April 2020	13.43
20	20	"Destanlar Yazacağız (Note: transl. "We Will Write Epics")"	Metin Günay	Mehmet Bozdağ, Atilla Engin, Aslı Zeynep Peker Bozdağ and Ozan Bodur	6 May 2020	7.45
21	21	"Kuruluş Ruhu (Note: transl. "The Soul of Establishment")"	Metin Günay	Mehmet Bozdağ, Atilla Engin, Aslı Zeynep Peker Bozdağ and Ozan Bodur	13 May 2020	17.51
22	22	"Kutlu Rüya (Note: transl. "A Blessed Dream")"	Metin Günay	Mehmet Bozdağ, Atilla Engin, Aslı Zeynep Peker Bozdağ and Ozan Bodur	20 May 2020	11.48
23	23	"Kutlu Yol (Note: transl. "A Blessed Path")"	Metin Günay	Mehmet Bozdağ, Atilla Engin, Aslı Zeynep Peker Bozdağ and Ozan Bodur	27 May 2020	13.47
24	24	"Zafer Milletindir (Note: transl. "The Nation of Victory")"	Metin Günay	Mehmet Bozdağ, Atilla Engin, Aslı Zeynep Peker Bozdağ and Ozan Bodur	3 June 2020	12.46
25	25	"Bizim Vatanımız (Note: transl. "Our Homeland")"	Metin Günay	Mehmet Bozdağ, Atilla Engin, Aslı Zeynep Peker Bozdağ and Ozan Bodur	10 June 2020	13.81
26	26	"Vatan Sevdamız (Note: transl. "Our Love for our Homeland")"	Metin Günay	Mehmet Bozdağ, Atilla Engin, Aslı Zeynep Peker Bozdağ and Ozan Bodur	17 June 2020	10.2
27	27	"Zafer Günü (Note: transl. "The Day of Victory")"	Metin Günay	Mehmet Bozdağ, Atilla Engin, Aslı Zeynep Peker Bozdağ and Ozan Bodur	24 June 2020	11.41

=== Season 2 (2020–2021) ===
Aya Nikola is set to become the new Tekfur of İnegöl followed by Ertuğrul's return to the tribe. Meanwhile, Yavlak Arslan, the new Uç Bey, seeks to create his own state and sees Osman as an obstacle, later on they unite against the new threat from the new Han of the İlhanlı (transl. Ilkhanate), who allies with Nikola against the Turks of Anatolia. Bala also faces the arrival of Targun, Nikola's spy who allies with Osman to save her father, İnal Bey. Along with these problems, Osman is elected as the new Bey after his father's death, and he decides to marry a second wife according to his father's will. After Targun's death, Osman meets Malhun Hatun and initiates a major battle with the Byzantines, historically known as the Battle of Mount Armenia in which his nephew Bayhoca, gets martyred by Flatyos which results in Savci Bey and Lena killing Flatyos as well as Osman Bey trying to find the traitor in the Kayı, as his jealous uncle Dündar helps the Byzantines stir traps for him. Following the arrival of Ömer Bey, father of Malhun Hatun, Geyhatu sends Kara Şaman Togay to eliminate both Osman's Kayı and Ömer's Bayındır.

Meanwhile, Malhun is sent by her father to İnegöl to ally with Nikola against Togay. However she gets captured in the castle by Togay, who has already allied with Nikola. Osman also captures Nikola's ally Tekfur Aris, seeking to ally with him, Togay then delivers an ultimatum to surrender the Tekfur in exchange for Malhun. Osman decides to use the captured tekfur as bait to trap Nikola. However, Togay kills Aris on the way which gives Nikola an excuse to keep Malhun in captivity.

Nikola martyrs Zülfikar Derviş, Osman's spy in İnegöl, and also releases Malhun to gain the support of Ömer Bey, who seeks to sell him horses to infiltrate and conquer the İnegöl castle but the sale of horses angers Osman, who (not knowing their plan) orders them to be seized.

Meanwhile, Togay ambushes some of the Kayı on the way back from Boran Alp's unfinished wedding with Gonca Hatun, which results in the martyrdom of Abdurrahman Gazi. Osman later attacks the incoming Kalanoz, who is the younger brother of Kalanoz and was sent after Flatyos’ capture and death, after learning of his arrival indirectly from the Mongols, killing many Byzantine soldiers and Osman also invites all Turkmen tribes to join the attack except the Bayındırlı, angering Ömer Bey. Şeyh Edebali later calls Osman and Ömer Bey to Söğüt to resolve their differences, leading to Ömer Bey handing over Dündar's ring to Osman, exposing Dündar as a traitor. Although Simon, Petrus, and Hazal Hatun are exposed and captured first, Osman lures Dündar into a trap and then captures him. Dündar then is taken to the tribe and sentenced to death by Osman. Just as he is about to be strangled to death by the Alps, he requests to be shot by Osman instead, using the arrow that killed Bayhoca per Savcı's wish, and gets eventually executed, whilst Hazal is exiled to the Çobanoğlu tribe. Osman then initiates a major battle with the Byzantines, with the support of Malhun Hatun which is historically known as the Battle of Domanic in which Kalanoz martyrs Savci Bey and gets killed by Osman later on. In the battle, Osman had tricked Togay by promising taxes. But when Osman kicks out the messenger sent by Togay, who later kills him, the Mongol Governor, Wali Yargucu, complains to the vassal ruler of Selcuk, Sultan Mesud II, who invites Osman under the pretext of giving him gifts. After an argument, Osman agrees to pay taxes to the Sultan, who promises him future aid. Osman's reception by Mesud II angers Omer Bey, who decides to make a name for himself. Nikola uses Omer's anger and uses him to attack Togay. However, Nikola betrays Omer and Togay ambushes him. In the meantime, the Mongol forces raid Omer's tribe, which depresses him, causing him to go to Togay for revenge. Gets saved by Osman. To improve their relations, Osman marries Omer's daughter, Malhun Hatun. Later, when the Kayis are migrating to Domaniç, Togay attacks them and Bamsi Beyrek gets martyred. Osman later takes revenge by killing Togay in Soğut. In the meantime, Nikola begins preparations for a great war and fights a major battle against Osman, aided by Sultan Mesud II. Osman wins, and greatly increases his respect among the other beys in Bithynia.

No. overall	No. in season	Title	Directed by	Written by	Original release date
28	1	"Kuruluş Osman Yeni Sezon (Note: transl. "New Kuruluş: Osman Season")"	Metin Günay	Mehmet Bozdağ, Atilla Engin and Aslı Zeynep Peker Bozdağ	7 October 2020
29	2	"Devletimiz Var Olsun (Note: transl. "May our State Last Long")"	Metin Günay	Mehmet Bozdağ, Atilla Engin and Aslı Zeynep Peker Bozdağ	14 October 2020
30	3	"Toy Zamanı (Note: transl. "Time for the Meeting")"	Metin Günay	Mehmet Bozdağ, Atilla Engin and Aslı Zeynep Peker Bozdağ	21 October 2020
31	4	"Varlık Gayemiz (Note: transl. "The Purpose of our Existence")"	Metin Günay	Mehmet Bozdağ, Atilla Engin and Aslı Zeynep Peker Bozdağ	28 October 2020
32	5	"Yol Kızıl Elmaya (Note: transl. "Road to the Red Apple")"	Metin Günay	Mehmet Bozdağ, Atilla Engin and Aslı Zeynep Peker Bozdağ	4 November 2020
33	6	"Diriliş Destanı (Note: transl. "The Resurrection Epic")"	Metin Günay	Mehmet Bozdağ, Atilla Engin and Aslı Zeynep Peker Bozdağ	11 November 2020
34	7	"Kuruluş Zamanı (Note: transl. "Time for Establishment")"	Metin Günay	Mehmet Bozdağ, Atilla Engin, Aslı Zeynep Peker Bozdağ and Rafet Elçi	18 November 2020
35	8	"Vatan Sevgimiz (Note: transl. "Our Love for our Homeland")"	Metin Günay	Mehmet Bozdağ, Atilla Engin, Aslı Zeynep Peker Bozdağ and Rafet Elçi	25 November 2020
36	9	"Kuruluş (Note: transl. "Establishment")"	Metin Günay	Mehmet Bozdağ, Atilla Engin, Aslı Zeynep Peker Bozdağ and Rafet Elçi	2 December 2020
37	10	"Türkün Zaferi (Note: transl. "The Turks' Victory")"	Metin Günay	Mehmet Bozdağ, Atilla Engin, Aslı Zeynep Peker Bozdağ and Rafet Elçi	9 December 2020
38	11	"Büyük Devlet Olma Vakti (Note: transl. "Time to be a Great State")"	Metin Günay	Mehmet Bozdağ, Atilla Engin, Aslı Zeynep Peker Bozdağ and Rafet Elçi	16 December 2020
39	12	"Gaziler Sultanı Gidiyor (Note: transl. "The Ghazis' Sultan is Going")"	Metin Günay	Mehmet Bozdağ, Atilla Engin, Aslı Zeynep Peker Bozdağ and Rafet Elçi	23 December 2020
40	13	"Bey Osman"	Metin Günay	Mehmet Bozdağ, Atilla Engin, Aslı Zeynep Peker Bozdağ and Rafet Elçi	30 December 2020
41	14	"İhanetin Bedeli (Note: transl. "The Price of Betrayal")"	Metin Günay	Mehmet Bozdağ, Atilla Engin, Aslı Zeynep Peker Bozdağ and Rafet Elçi	6 January 2021
42	15	"Osmanlılar (Note: transl. "The Ottomans")"	Metin Günay	Mehmet Bozdağ, Atilla Engin, Aslı Zeynep Peker Bozdağ and Rafet Elçi	20 January 2021
43	16	"Fetih Sancağı (Note: transl. "The Flag of Conquest")"	Metin Günay	Mehmet Bozdağ, Atilla Engin and Aslı Zeynep Peker Bozdağ	27 January 2021
44	17	"Can Verir Yurt Vermeyiz (Note: transl. "We Give Blood, not our Home")"	Metin Günay	Mehmet Bozdağ	4 February 2021
45	18	"Zaferden Zafere (Note: transl. "From Victory to Victory")"	Metin Günay	Mehmet Bozdağ	10 February 2021
46	19	"Hainler Temizlenecek (Note: transl. "Traitors will be Removed")"	Metin Günay	Mehmet Bozdağ	17 February 2021
47	20	"Şehitler Yurdu (Note: transl. "Home of the Martyrs")"	Metin Günay	Mehmet Bozdağ, Atilla Engin and Aslı Zeynep Peker Bozdağ	24 February 2021
48	21	"Kahraman Can Verir (Note: transl. "The Hero Gives His Blood")"	Metin Günay	Mehmet Bozdağ, Atilla Engin and Aslı Zeynep Peker Bozdağ	3 March 2021
49	22	"Birlik Olursak (Note: transl. "If We Are United")"	Metin Günay	Mehmet Bozdağ, Atilla Engin and Aslı Zeynep Peker Bozdağ	10 March 2021
50	23	"Şühedanın İzindeyiz (Note: transl. "Following the suspect")"	Metin Günay	Mehmet Bozdağ, Atilla Engin and Aslı Zeynep Peker Bozdağ	17 March 2021
51	24	"Yolun Sonu Zafer (Note: transl. "The road to the final victory")"	Metin Günay	Mehmet Bozdağ, Atilla Engin and Aslı Zeynep Peker Bozdağ	24 March 2021
52	25	"Osman Bey"	Metin Günay	Mehmet Bozdağ, Atilla Engin and Aslı Zeynep Peker Bozdağ	31 March 2021
53	26	"Haine Merhamet Olmaz (Note: transl. "No mercy for a traitor")"	Metin Günay	Mehmet Bozdağ, Atilla Engin and Aslı Zeynep Peker Bozdağ	7 April 2021
54	27	"Zafer Hakkındır (Note: transl. "Victory is Haqq's")"	Metin Günay	Mehmet Bozdağ, Atilla Engin and Aslı Zeynep Peker Bozdağ	14 April 2021
55	28	"Türkün Adaleti (Note: transl. "Justice of Turks")"	Metin Günay	Mehmet Bozdağ, Atilla Engin and Aslı Zeynep Peker Bozdağ	21 April 2021
56	29	"Devletimiz İçin (Note: transl. "For Our State")"	Metin Günay	Mehmet Bozdağ, Atilla Engin and Aslı Zeynep Peker Bozdağ	28 April 2021
57	30	"Birlikte Rahmet Var (Note: transl. "There Is Mercy Together")"	Metin Günay	Mehmet Bozdağ, Atilla Engin and Aslı Zeynep Peker Bozdağ	5 May 2021
58	31	"Osman Bey"	Metin Günay	Mehmet Bozdağ, Atilla Engin and Aslı Zeynep Peker Bozdağ	12 May 2021
59	32	"Bir Olma Vakti (Note: transl. "Time To Be One")"	Metin Günay	Mehmet Bozdağ, Atilla Engin and Aslı Zeynep Peker Bozdağ	19 May 2021
60	33	"Bamsı Bey"	Metin Günay	Mehmet Bozdağ, Atilla Engin and Aslı Zeynep Peker Bozdağ	26 May 2021
61	34	"Osmanlılar (Note: transl. "Ottomans")"	Metin Günay	Mehmet Bozdağ, Atilla Engin and Aslı Zeynep Peker Bozdağ	2 June 2021
62	35	"Zafer Bizimdir (Note: transl. "Victory is ours")"	Metin Günay	Mehmet Bozdağ, Atilla Engin and Aslı Zeynep Peker Bozdağ	9 June 2021
63	36	"Türkün Davası (Note: transl. "The Turks' Cause")"	Metin Günay	Mehmet Bozdağ, Atilla Engin and Aslı Zeynep Peker Bozdağ	16 June 2021
64	37	"Son Türk Ölmeden (Note: transl. "Before the Last Turk Dies")"	Metin Günay	Mehmet Bozdağ, Atilla Engin and Aslı Zeynep Peker Bozdağ	23 June 2021

- List of Diriliş: Ertuğrul episodes
- List of Kuruluş: Osman characters
- List of awards and nominations received by Kuruluş: Osman

=== Season 3 (2021–2022) ===
Only some months or a month has passed since Osman sent the Great Komutan Dukas to Hell. Osman has now constructed a beautiful tent that resembles a palace and has earned a lot of respect in the border areas. However, troubles have also started awaiting him. Aya Nikola, who had escaped previously now, has contacted his old friends, Tekfur Rogatus Laskaris of Bilecik, and Tekfur Mikail Kosses of Harmankaya Kalesi, and Rogatus plans to capture Papas Gregor. Another lone warrior along with his two alps Kutan And Acar has captured Kosses' sister Princess Mari and this results in quite often skirmishes between Turgut and Kosses and even Nikola poking his nose in between them. Rogatus is the real enemy who has Bahadir, a man of Bayindir Tribe as his spy but blames it on Kosses. Another problem had arrived with the German Catalans leader Anselmo. Within a few days he was killed along with his party who were money greedy by Osman and Malhun during a trap designed for them. Now trouble starts to intensify as Julia along with her Christian assassins have reached Bythinia which results in the martyrdom of Boran Alp's wife Gonca Hatun. Meanwhile she wanted to steal the old treasure of Osman that was given to him by Ertuğrul Bey.

Boran has gone crazy after Gonca's death. Vizier Alemshah arrives with Commander Konur to arrest Osman for being a traitor to the laws of Selcuk.

Meanwhile, Turgut falls in love with Mari and Kosses allows their marriage in Harmankaya Kalesi. The arrival of Mongols results in the martyrdom of Goktug Alp who was surprisingly martyred by the entry of Geyhatu Han. For some episodes, skirmishes between Osman, Vizier, and Geyhatu continue and intensify when Osman allies with Byzantines and again the Selcuk traitor, Mongols, and the lone Gungor Bey. At this time a poor farmer known as Akca Coban makes an entry, who is thought to be the historical Akcakoca Alp, gets martyred soon. Osman finally kills the Vizier after planning an efficient trap for him and also tries to kill Geyhatu for a long-awaited revenge for Goktug but stops as Sultan Mesud arrives to stop him, for further problems with the Ilkhanate state. Bala gives birth to her son Alaeddin Ali Bey. A Pope leader soon arrives, known as Ustad Arius along with his student Isaac. He acts as a fake dervish along with Isaac posing as his student to Akca Dervish. Umur Bey who had gone on the hajj after winning the battle against Dukas has come back but gets martyred by Barkin Bey who is secretly a student of Ustad Arius. Ustad Arius creates a deep wound to Osman killing the adopted son of his uncle Dundar Bey, Saltuk Alp. Osman, Nikola, Sultan Mesud, and Imperator Andronikus signed a treaty for seven years to have no war and peace between the two arch-rivals. Seven years have passed and Osman has become a bit old. Gunduz Bey has become too old and Selcan Hatun is about to leave the world. Orhan Bey and Alaettin Bey have become young kids. Osman and Malhun's daughter Fatma Hatun arrives in the Kayi Tribe. Nikola has not forgotten Osman and continues to fight against him as the seven-year peace period is over. Osman first conquers Bilecik castle killing Tekfur Justinianus who attempts to assassinate Osman and his family by inviting him to his castle, but a sad era approaches when Selcan Hatun passes away the next day. Osman conquers inegol as Aktemur first spies in Bilecik and then opens the door to Inegol. Nikola is killed and Gunduz Bey is martyred. Mongols reappear along with Komutan Romanus, along with the Cobanoglu Bey, Ali Bey and his bragging son Mustafa Bey, along with the traitor Atabey Ahmet, who is killed by Romanus. Barkin's treachery is revealed by his alp Hussamettin and wife Selvi, and is soon killed by Osman. Barkin also previously killed the Mongol Komutan Cebe. Osman conquers Yenisher with the martyrdom of Davut Bey and Aygul Hatun.

=== Season 4 (2022–2023) ===
Two more years have passed, and Osman is the owner of the grand city Yenisehir and a half-built state. The Vikings Olof and Frigg have arrived. Kantakuzenos wants to become the Emperor and has planned to kill Andronicus, along with Centaur. Osman reaches Constantinople in time to save the Emperor in the arena. Malhun Hatun maintains the trade system at Yenisehir and has a rocky start with Bengi Hatun.

Meanwhile, due to the increasing popularity of Osman Bey after conquering Marmaracik Castle, Bayindir Bey in a fit of jealousy, invites Valide Ismihan Sultan, a Selcuk queen mother to Yenisehir. Ismihan Sultan continues to put hurdles in Osman's way. Osman initiates a majot battle with Komutan Nayman, a Mongol warrior who is against the Gazan Han because he accepted Islam. Meanwhile Osman beheads his all enemies one by one like Kantakuzenous, Olof and Nayman. Sultan Alaeddin is dethroned and sent to Gazan Han along his mother Ismihan.

Meanwhile, it is shown that Malhun Hatun is pregnant for third time with Osman's fifth child and their happiness is beyond the limits. Sultan Mesud is enthroned again and he allows Osman Bey to announce his "Osmanli Beyligi" in which all Ottomans will not pay any tax to any state.

=== Season 5 (2023–2024) ===
Years have passed as all the young kids of Osman have grown up to be adults. Osman Bey and Malhun Hatun are living in a palace in Yenışehir. They are dealing with Şanli Germıyanoğlu Yakup Bey, who is the new self proclaimed Sultan of Turkmen as Sultan Mesud has been poisoned and died. Boran and Konur have become beys but Cerkutay joins Yakup Bey as he was imprisoned for 7 years in Lefke Kalesi with an overgrown beard, bruises and no one cared about him (according to his perspective). Bala Hatun is suffering from an unknown disease and mourning the death of her daughter Halime. Orhan unknowingly raided Princess Holofira's caravan, alongside Sanjaksizlar(a group of bandits) to prove his bravery to them. They seem to ally with Osman Bey.

Meanwhile Orhan Bey has tension with the Germiyanid successor Mehmet Bey, who uses one of the Sanjaksizlar as his spy. The Christian crusaders powered by the pope after so many years have secretly sent Komutan Vasilus to spy in the Kayi palace known as Veysel Alp. Ustad Gera, one of the prominent Christian Leaders, comes in with a disguise of a fake merchant Ayhan Aga and tries to Martyr Boran, who luckily survives and plans a conspiracy against Bayindir Bey in which Alaeddin Ali proves him innocent. Bala Hatun gets better from her disease and comes to Yenisehir to meet Saadet Hatun but faints again after some time, when she gets better Osman asks her to stay in Sogut to protect the Sogut. The Crusaders launch an attack on Sogut where Bala, Alaeddin and Gonca Hatun fight off the intruders. The Crusaders draw back to instill fear. When Osman bey goes to the Mongol ambassador to seek revenge for his entering the tents disrespectfully, Yakup bey takes over Yenisehir because of the attack on Sogut after Mehmet bey blames Orhan, Alaeddin and Osman bey for the lack of security of Turk land. Yakup Bey sends Orhan and Mehmet to launch a surprise attack on the Crusaders. The spies in the palace (Veysel Alp) tell the enemies ahead and Mehmed and Orhan get captured. Alaeddin tries to get to the spies in the castle. When Osman comes back, he and Yakup Bey discuss what to do to get their sons back. Yakup Bey wants to give the castles back to the Crusaders but Osman objects and Yakup Bey orders him to stay back. Osman and Malhun Hatun secretly enter the Kestel with Holafira's help and save Mehmet and Orhan. Yakup Bey then doesn't give the castles to Tekfur. Back in Yenisehir, Bala Hatun and Alaeddin Bey stop Saddet Hatun from ruining Osman's secret plant to save the sons by putting Saadet, Gonca, and Cekrutyae in prison and Gonca feels like she is confused about Alaeddin since he is with or against her based on the circumstances. Osman and Malhun return with Mehmed, Orhan and Holofira.

Osman talks to the people in the Uch Bazar about how he is taking back his allegiance and how Kestel Kalesi belongs to Kayi. Yakup Bey is disturbed by this. Malhun Hatun is still persistent that Orhan not marry Holofira as Holofira is non-Muslim and will not be able to do anything for a rising Muslim state. Meanwhile Orhan proposes to Holofira. Alaeddin also confesses his love for Gonca Hatun in front of his siblings. Suddenly Karacelasun, a Mongol Komutan, seeks revenge after Osman killed his brother comes to Uch Bazar and destroy it, Bala Hatun and Malhun Hatun work with Alaeddin and Orhan to hold off the intruders. In the end, Osman Bey asks Mehmed where Yakup Bey is when his bazaar is attacked. This leads to even more distrust in Yakup Bey's ability to be sultan. Alaeddin tries to find a cure for the poison that seems to be inflicting all the wounded, including Gonca Hatun and Cerutaye Jr. He finds that the Mongols used an unknown fast acting poison. All are concerned with the current events and Osman is also slightly injured by a poisoned arrow while saving Yakup Bey and others from Mongols. Sometime later when everyone has recovered due to Alaeddin's cure, the Mongol Gorklu Han comes into action, wanting to marry the Byzantine princess Maria, but dies very early due to a cunning plan of Osman Bey along with the treacherous Christian commander Veysel. Later Holofira's evil aunts come into action when a group of scared Tekfurs summon her. Things become more difficult for Osman Bey when she calls Roma Celladi, who is a Selçuk Christian convert who came to Anatolia to crush the Turks. He martyrs Cavundur Bayinder, Uraz Bey, fatally wounding the former Mongol commander, Cerkutay Bey. Shamil Bey returns in action after taking Malhun Hatun back to her tribe, as she expected.
