= Kuruluş: Osman season 6 =

Kurulus Osman
- Season 6
- Starring: Burak Özçivit; Emre Bey; Özge Törer
- No. of episodes: 30

Release
- Original network: ATV
- Original release: 2 October 2024 – 4 June 2025

Season chronology
- ← Previous; Season 5 Next → Kuruluş: Orhan season 1

The sixth season of the Turkish TV series Kuruluş: Osman, was the last season of the series created by Mehmet Bozdağ, premiered on October 2, 2024 and ended on 4th June 2025 bölüm 194 as season finale.

== Release ==
The sixth season of "Kuruluş: Osman" premiered on October 2, 2024, continuing the epic tale of the founder of the Ottoman Empire with gripping new adventures and character developments.

== Production ==
The sixth season of the Turkish TV series "Kuruluş: Osman" (2024) was expertly crafted by Mehmet Bozdağ and directed by Ahmet Yılmaz.

=== Production Details ===
This new season was realized by a committed team that includes:

- Production Company: Bozdağ Film
- Project Design: Mehmet Bozdağ
- Producer: Mehmet Bozdağ
- Director: Ahmet Yılmaz
- Screenplay Writers: Mehmet Bozdağ, A. Kadir İlter, Fatma Nur Güldalı, Ali Ozan Salkım, Aslı Zeynep Peker Bozdağ

== Episodes ==
No. in episode	No. in season	Title	Directed by	Written by	Original release date
1	6	TBA	Ahmet Yilmaz	Mehmet Bozdağ	2 October 2024
2	6	TBA	Ahmet Yilmaz	Mehmet Bozdağ	9 October 2024
3	6	TBA	Ahmet Yilmaz	Mehmet Bozdağ	16 October 2024
4	6	TBA	Ahmet Yilmaz	Mehmet Bozdağ	23 October 2024
5	6	TBA	Ahmet Yilmaz	Mehmet Bozdağ	30 October 2024
6	6	TBA	Ahmet Yilmaz	Mehmet Bozdağ	6 November 2024
7	6	TBA	Ahmet Yilmaz	Mehmet Bozdağ	13 November 2024
8	6	TBA	Ahmet Yilmaz	Mehmet Bozdağ	20 November 2024
9	6	TBA	Ahmet Yilmaz	Mehmet Bozdağ	27 November 2024
10	6	TBA	Ahmet Yilmaz	Mehmet Bozdağ	4 December 2024

== Cast ==
Cast of "Kuruluş: Osman" Season 6
Actor	Character	Bölüm
Burak Özçivit	Osman Bey	1 - 194
Özge Törer	Bala Hatun	1 - 194
Emre Bey	Orhan Bey	131 - 191
Ali Sürmeli	Karesi Bey	165 - 174
Çağrı Şensoy	Cerkutay	10 -
Yiğit Uçan	Boran	1 -
Ö. Faruk Aran	Alaeddin Bey	131- 194
Özgür Çevik	Lucas	165 - 179
Leya Kırşan	Fatma Hatun	131 - 194
Ecem Sena Bayır	Holofira	131 - 191
Belgin Şimşek	Gonca Hatun	131 - 194
Buçe Buse Kahraman	Begüm Hatun	165 - 192
Feyza Işık	Hazal Hatun	165 - 174
Begüm Çağla Taşkın	Ülgen Hatun	99 - 193
Ekin Mert Daymaz	İlbay	165 - 186
Ali Önsöz	Yusuf	165 - 187
Erdem Şanlı	Saruca	165 - 181
Taner Ertürkler	Bayhan Bey	165 - 174
Fatih Ayhan	Baysungur	28 - 169
Yıldırım Gücük	Gencer Bey	165 - 173
Turpal Tokaev	Turahan	
Murat Boncuk	Aykurt	? -
Ali Osman Arıkbaş	Gazi Alp	131 -
Ekin Pasvanoğlu	Ayse	165 - 186
Sonat Dursun	Sancar Bey	165 - 173
İsmail Erkan Bilben	Kanyumaz	165 - 175
Aybike Unishte		
Alma Terziç	Sofia	1 -27/ 169 -
Asya Agca	Halime	173 -
Cengiz Coskun	Turgut Gazi	190 -
