= Kuruluş: Osman season 5 =

2023 Turkish television season

Kurulus Osman
- Season 5
- Starring: Burak Özçivit; Yıldız Çağrı Atiksoy; Özge Törer; Emre Bey
- No. of episodes: 34

Release
- Original network: ATV
- Original release: 4 October 2023 – 12 June 2024

Season chronology
- Next → Season 6

The fifth season of the Turkish TV series Kuruluş: Osman, created by Mehmet Bozdağ, premiered on October 4, 2023, and concluded on 12 June 2024. Filming for this season began in late August 2023.

== Plot summary ==
The story follows the lives of the people of Osman, who have grown up and moved on to adulthood. Osman Bey and Malhun Hatun are now living in a palace in Yenışehir, where they face challenges from Şanli Germıyanoğlu Yakup Bey, the new self-proclaimed Sultan of Turkmen after Sultan Mesud was poisoned. Boran and Konur have become Beys, while Cerkutay joins Yakup Bey after being imprisoned for seven years in Lefke Kalesi. Unfortunately, Bala Hatun is suffering from an unknown disease and mourning the loss of her daughter, Halime.

Orhan unknowingly raided the caravan of Prenses Holofira along Sanjaksizlar to prove his bravery to them, but they later became allies with Osman Bey. Meanwhile, Orhan Bey is also dealing with tension from the Germiyanid successor Mehmet Bey, who uses one of the Sanjaksizlar as his spy. The Christian crusaders have secretly sent Komutan Vasilus to spy in the Kayi palace, known as Veysel Alp. Ustad Gera, one of the prominent Christian leaders, disguises himself as a fake merchant Ayhan Aga and tries to martyr Boran. However, Boran luckily survives and plans a conspiracy against Bayindir Bey in which Alaeddin Ali proves him innocent.

Bala Hatun gets better from her disease and comes to Yenisehir to meet Saadet Hatun but faints again. When she recovers, Osman asks her to stay in Sogut to protect the sogut. The Crusaders launch an attack on Sogut, where Bala, Alaeddin, and Gonca Hatun fight off the intruders. The Crusaders draw back to instill fear. When Osman Bey goes to the Mongol ambassador to seek revenge for his entering the tents disrespectfully, Yakup Bey takes over Yenisehir because of the attack on Sogut. After Mehmet Bey blames Orhan, Alaeddin, and Osman Bey for the lack of security in Turk land, Fatma Hatun catches Gonca Hatun sneaking into Alaeddin Ali's room. Yakup Bey sends Orhan and Mehmet to launch a surprise attack on the Crusaders, but the spies in the palace (Veysel Alp) tell the enemies ahead, and Mehmed and Orhan get captured. Alaeddin tries to get to the spies in the castle. When Osman comes back, he and Yakup Bey discuss what to do to get their sons back. Yakup Bey wants to give the castles back to the Crusaders, but Osman objects and Yakup Bey orders him to stay back. Osman and Malhun Hatun secretly enter the Kestel with Holafira's help and save Mehmet and Orhan. Yakup Bey then doesn't give the castles to Tekfur.

Back in Yenisehir, Bala Hatun and Alaeddin Bey stop Saadet Hatun from ruining Osman's secret plan to save the sons by putting Saadet, Gonca, and Cekrutaye in prison. Gonca feels confused about Alaeddin since he appears to be with or against her based on the circumstances. Osman and Malhun return with Mehmed, Orhan, and Holofira. Osman talks to the people in the Uch Bazar about how he is taking back his allegiance and how Kestel Kalesi belongs to Kayi, which disturbs Yakup Bey. Malhun Hatun is still persistent that Orhan shall not marry Holofira as she is a non-Muslim and will not be able to do anything for a rising Muslim state. However, Orhan proposes to Holofira, but he married Elcim Hatun daughter of Gunduz Bey. Before marriage Elcim does not accept this marriage because Orhan loves someone else but after some time she accepts the marriage only for the wellbeing of her tribe's people. Alaeddin also confesses his love for Gonca Hatun in front of his siblings.

Suddenly, Karacelasun, a Mongol komutan, seeks revenge after Osman kills his brother and comes to Uch Bazar, destroying it. Bala Hatun and Malhun Hatun work with Orhan, Alaeddin, and Fatma to hold off the intruders. In the end, Osman Bey asks Mehmed where Yakup Bey is when his bazaar is being attacked, leading to even more distrust in Yakup Bey's ability to be sultan. Alaeddin tries to find a cure for the poison that seems to be inflicting all the wounded, including Gonca Hatun and Cerutaye Jr. He finds that the Mongols used an unknown poison that is fast-acting. All are concerned with the current events, and Osman is also slightly injured by a poisoned arrow while saving Yakup Bey and others from Mongols.

== Production ==
The season was written and produced by Mehmet Bozdağ and directed by Ahmet Yilmaz.

=== Production details ===
The fifth season of the Turkish TV series, "Kuruluş: Osman" (2023), was brought to life by a dedicated team consisting of:

- Production Company: Bozdağ Film
- Project Design: Mehmet Bozdağ
- Producer: Mehmet Bozdağ
- Director: Ahmet Yılmaz
- Screenplay Writers: Mehmet Bozdağ, A. Kadir İlter, Fatma Nur Güldalı, Ali Ozan Salkım, Aslı Zeynep Peker Bozdağ

== Release ==
October 4, 2023

== Cast ==
Character	Actor/Actress
Osman Bey	Burak Özçivit
Bala Hatun	Özge Törer
Malhun Hatun	Yıldız Çağrı Atiksoy
Orhan Bey	Emre Bey
Alaeddin Bey	Ömer Faruk Aran
Fatma Hatun	Leya Kirşan
Holofira	Ecem Sena Bayır
Yakup Bey	Mirza Bahattin Dogan
Saadet Hatun	Sevil Aki
Mehmet Bey	Emre Dinler
Yunus Emre	Gökhan Atalay
Gonca Hatun	Belgin Şimşek

== Episodes ==
No. in episode	No. in season	Title	Directed by	Written by	Original release date
1	5	"After the Victory of Bafeus..."	Ahmet Yilmaz	Mehmet Bozdağ	4 October 2023
Years have passed since the victory of Bafeus. Osman Bey's sons have grown up and become beys. Osman Bey continues his quest for the ideal of Bursa, and Malhun Hatun is always by his side in this pursuit.
2	5	"The fate of the rebels is known..."	Ahmet Yilmaz	Mehmet Bozdağ	11 October 2023
Osman Bey challenges Yakup Bey for Sultan Mesud's treasure, igniting a fierce rivalry. Tensions rise as Orhan and Alaeddin are tasked to find the treasure, and Yakup Bey becomes determined to thwart Osman. The narrative explores themes of love, while confrontations and tensions escalate with the Sancaksız people, Malhun Hatun, and Saadet Hatun. Yakup Bey appoints Cerkutay as the patron of Uç Pazar, and Osman Bey's unexpected encounter with Yakup Bey in Germiyan adds uncertainty to their rivalry.
3	5	"Osman Bey challenges Yakup Bey"	Ahmet Yilmaz	Mehmet Bozdağ	25 October 2023
Osman Bey is aware of the treasure left by Sultan Mesud. He thinks that the only thing that will break Yakup Bey's domination is the treasure. He gives a task regarding this to both Orhan Bey and Alaeddin Bey. Alaeddin Bey will follow Yakup Bey's every step, and Orhan Bey will find the treasure! Yakup Bey learns about the treasure along with the decree brought by Gonca. Yakup Bey sees it as legitimate to do anything for power. He will not leave the treasure to Osman Bey.
4	5	TBA	Ahmet Yilmaz	Mehmet Bozdağ	1 November 2023
Yakup Bey conquered Lefke Castle and claims to give it to Osman Bey, but Osman suspects his motives. A new enemy, Master Gera, arrives in Uçlar, sparking chaos and a plot to kill Osman's trusted man, Boran. Meanwhile, Malhun Hatun devises a scheme against Saadet Hatun, and Orhan Bey, disguised as a Mongol, takes the treasure and shoots Mehmet Bey. As Yakup Bey and Osman Bey face each other once more, Yakup seeks Osman's allegiance, leaving Osman's response uncertain.
5	5	TBA	Ahmet Yilmaz	Mehmet Bozdağ	8 November 2023
6	5	TBA	Ahmet Yilmaz	Mehmet Bozdağ	15 November 2023
7	5	TBA	Ahmet Yilmaz	Mehmet Bozdağ	22 November 2023
8	5	TBA	Ahmet Yilmaz	Mehmet Bozdağ	29 November 2023
9	5	TBA	Ahmet Yilmaz	Mehmet Bozdağ	6 December 2023
