= List of awards and nominations received by Kuruluş: Osman =

List of Kuruluş: Osman awards and nominations
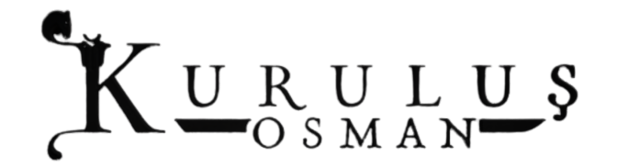
- Official logo
Awards and nominations
Award	Wins	Nominations
Istanbul University Project Club	7	1
International Venice TV Awards	1	0
Golden Palm Awards	6	0
Crystal Globe Awards	4	0
Media Oscar	1	0
Quality Magazine 2021	2	0
Eurasian Consumer Protection Association Award	5	0
European Awards	3	0
Crystal Diamond Awards	2	0
Moon Life Awards	1	0
5th International Diamond Awards	1	0
Istanbul University - Cerrahpaşa Theater Group Awards	1	0
Ayakli Gazete TV Stars Awards	4	0

Totals (Note: Certain award groups do not simply award one winner. They acknowledge several different recipients, have runners-up, and have third place. Since this is a specific recognition and is different from losing an award, runner-up mentions are considered wins in this award tally. For simplification and to avoid errors, each award in this list has been presumed to have had a prior nomination.)
- Wins: 38
- Nominations: 1

Kuruluş: Osman (transl. Establishment: Osman) is a Turkish historical drama television series created by Mehmet Bozdağ and starring Burak Özçivit. The successful series has received many awards. Burak Özçivit won eight awards for his role in the series. Özge Törer won six awards for her role in the series. Yıldız Çağrı Atiksoy won two awards for her role in the series. Ömer Faruk Aran won his first acting accolade for his role in the series. Below is a list of awards and nominations received by Kurulus: Osman.

== Istanbul University Project Club (Golden 61 Awards) ==
Burak Özçivit won an award for Best Male Actor of the Year in the Istanbul University Project Club (Golden 61 Awards) in 2020.

In 2021, Kuruluş: Osman won three more awards; Best Producer of the Year to Bozdağ Film, Best TV Series of the Year to Kuruluş: Osman and Best Male Actor of the Year to Burak Özçivit. Özge Törer and Burak Özçivit were nominated for Best TV Couple for their roles as Osman Bey and Bala Hatun. Yildiz Cagri Atiksoy won Best Actress of the Year award in 2023 for her role.

Year	Nominee	Category	Result	Ref.
2020	Burak Özçivit	Best Male Actor of the Year	Won	
2021	Bozdağ Film	Best Producer of the Year	Won	
2021	Kuruluş: Osman	Best TV Series of the Year	Won	
2021	Burak Özçivit	Best Male Actor of the Year	Won	
2021	Burak Özçivit and Özge Törer	Best TV Couple (Osman Bey & Bala Hatun)	Nominated	
2023	Yıldız Çağrı Atiksoy	Best Actress of the Year	Won	
2025	Özge Törer	Best Actress of the Year	Won	
2025	Ömer Faruk Aran	Best Supporting Actor of the Year	Won	

== International Venice TV Awards ==
Kuruluş: Osman won an award in the 2020 International Venice TV Awards for the category, Best Serie, becoming the first Turkish series in history to be awarded in these awards.

Year	Nominee	Category	Result	Ref.
2020	Kuruluş: Osman	Best Series	Won	

== Golden Palm Awards ==
The Golden Palm Awards are considered one of the most prestigious and most important awards for films. Winners are selected based on an online vote in four main categories: media, cinema, music, and television series. The seventh annual ceremony, in which approximately three million people voted, was postponed from March 23 to November 2020 due to the COVID-19 pandemic. The series won an award in the category, TV Series of the Year. The producer, Mehmet Bozdağ, also won the Best Producer of the Year award.

In 2021, the series won four more awards: TV Series of the Year, Best Producer of the Year to Mehmet Bozdağ, and Best Actor of the Year to Burak Özçivit and also best TV series actress of the year to Yıldız Çağrı Atiksoy.

Year	Nominee	Category	Result	Ref.
2020	Kuruluş: Osman	TV Series of the Year	Won	
2020	Mehmet Bozdağ	Best Producer of the Year	Won	
2021	Kuruluş: Osman	TV Series of the Year	Won	
2021	Mehmet Bozdağ	Best Producer of the Year	Won	
2021	Burak Özçivit	Best Actor of the Year	Won	
2021	Yıldız Çağrı Atiksoy	Best TV Series Actress of the Year	Won	

== Crystal Globe Awards ==
The Crystal Globe Awards are based on a people's vote. Four members of the series' cast won an award at a ceremony held at Grand Cevahir.

Year	Nominee	Category	Result	Ref.
2020	Özge Törer	Best Actress of the Year	Won	
2020	Ayşen Gürler	Best Debuting Actress of the Year	Won	
2020	Emel Dede	Best Supporting Actress of the Year	Won	
2020	Oğuz Kara	Best Child Actor of the Year	Won	

== Media Oscar ==
Burak Özçivit won an award for Best Male Actor of the Year in the Media Oscar awarded by the Association of Radio and Television Journalists in Turkey.

Year	Nominee	Category	Result	Ref.
2020	Burak Özçivit	Best Male Actor of the Year	Won	

== Quality Magazine Awards 2021 ==
Year	Nominee	Category	Result	Ref.
2021	Burak Özçivit	Best Male Actor	Won	
2021	Kuruluş: Osman	Best TV Series	Won	

== Eurasian Consumer Protection Association Award ==
Year	Nominee	Category	Result	Ref.
2021	Kuruluş: Osman	Best TV Series of the Year	Won	
2021	Burak Özçivit	Best Actor of the Year	Won	
2021	Özge Törer	Best Actress of the Year	Won	
2021	Best Supporting Actors of the Year	Emel Dede	Won	
2021	Best Supporting Actors of the Year	Ayşen Gürler	Won	

== European Awards ==
Year	Nominee	Category	Result	Ref.
2021	Kuruluş: Osman	Best TV Series	Won	
2021	Burak Özçivit	Best Actor	Won	
2021	Mehmet Bozdağ	Best Producer	Won	

== Crystal Diamond Awards ==
Year	Nominee	Category	Result	Ref.
2021	Kuruluș Osman	Serie of the Year	Won	
2021	Mehmet Bozdäg	Producer of the Year	Won	

== Moon Life Awards ==
Year	Nominee	Category	Result	Ref.
2021	Kuruluș Osman	Best TV Series of the Year	Won	

== 5th International Diamond Awards ==
Year	Nominee	Category	Result	Ref.
2025	Özge Törer	TV Actress of the Year	Won	

== Istanbul University - Cerrahpaşa Theater Group Awards ==
Year	Nominee	Category	Result	Ref.
2024	Özge Törer	Best Actress in a TV Series	Won	

== Ayakli Gazete TV Stars Awards ==
Year	Nominee	Category	Result	Ref.
2021	Burak Özçivit	Best Actor	Won	
2021	Mehmet Bozdağ	Best TV Series Writer	Won	
2021	Nurettin Sönmez	Best Supporting Actor	Won	
2024	Özge Törer	Rising Star of the Year	Won	

== See also ==
- List of Kuruluş: Osman episodes
- List of Kuruluş: Osman characters
- List of awards and nominations received by Diriliş: Ertuğrul
