= List of Diriliş: Ertuğrul episodes =

This is a list of episodes from the Turkish TV series, Diriliş: Ertuğrul, created by Mehmet Bozdağ. It premiered in Turkey on TRT 1 on 10 December 2014. Originally 150 episodes, it was later released on Netflix cut into shorter episodes with the number of 448. The show has been well received in Turkey and abroad, particularly in Pakistan and Azerbaijan.

== Episodes ==
Series	Episodes	Originally released		
Series	Episodes	First released	Last released	Network
1	26 (Note: 76 on Netflix & PTV)	10 December 2014	17 June 2015	TRT 1
2	35 (Note: 103 on Netflix, 104 on PTV)	30 September 2015	8 June 2016	TRT 1
3	30 (Note: 91 on Netflix & PTV)	26 October 2016	14 June 2017	TRT 1
4	30 (Note: 90 on Netflix & 91 on PTV)	25 October 2017	6 June 2018	TRT 1
5	29 (Note: 88 on Netflix & 108 on PTV)	7 November 2018	29 May 2019	TRT 1

=== Season 1 (2014–15) ===
Süleyman Şah, Bey of the Kayı sends his son, Ertuğrul, to ask for land from the Emir of Aleppo. This is made almost impossible when the Kayı are put in a series of problems with the Templars after saving Şehzade Numan, Halime Sultan, and Şehzade Yiğit because of the traitor in the Emir's palace, Nasir, who works for the Templars but is later killed by Ertuğrul and the truth is shown to the Emir. A problem also arises with Kurdoğlu Bey, Süleyman Şah's adoptive brother, who seeks his brother's Beylik with the help of Selcan Hatun, Ertuğrul's sister-in-law, who wants revenge from Süleyman Şah as he killed her treacherous father, Alptekin Bey. Ertuğrul, who loves Halime, marries her after much difficulty. Selcan's husband, Gündoğdu becomes jealous of his brother Ertuğrul as he is respected as the tribe hero but gradually calms down. Towards the end of the season, Kurdoğlu is beheaded, Ertuğrul successfully defeats the Templars and captures their castle, and Selcan repents. This is followed by Süleyman Şah's death and the tribe's migration to Erzurum as part of Süleyman Şah's will before he died.

No. overall	No. in season	Title	Directed by	Written by	Original release date	Turkey viewers (millions)
1	1	"Pilot"	Emre Konuk	Mehmet Bozdağ and Atilla Engin	10 December 2014	5.54
2	2	"Av, Part 1"	Emre Konuk	Mehmet Bozdağ and Atilla Engin	17 December 2014	5.82
3	3	"Av, Part 2"	Metin Günay	Mehmet Bozdağ, Atilla Engin, Mustafa Burak Doğu, Hale Aksu Engin and Alp Emre Oduncu	24 December 2014	5.96
4	4	"Hain Olan"	Metin Günay	Mehmet Bozdağ, Atilla Engin, Mustafa Burak Doğu, Hale Aksu Engin, Alp Emre Oduncu and Ahmet Turgut	7 January 2015	6.13
5	5	"Ertuğrul"	Metin Günay	Mehmet Bozdağ, Mustafa Burak Doğu, Hale Aksu Engin, Alp Emre Oduncu and Ahmet Turgut	14 January 2015	5.93
6	6	"Süleyman Şah"	Metin Günay	Mehmet Bozdağ, Mustafa Burak Doğu, Hale Aksu Engin, Alp Emre Oduncu and Ahmet Turgut	21 January 2015	5.60
7	7	"İlahi Adalet"	Metin Günay	Mehmet Bozdağ, Mustafa Burak Doğu, Hale Aksu Engin, Alp Emre Oduncu and Aslı Zeynep Peker Bozdağ	28 January 2015	5.06
8	8	"Hesap Vakti"	Metin Günay	Mehmet Bozdağ, Mustafa Burak Doğu, Hale Aksu Engin, Alp Emre Oduncu and Aslı Zeynep Peker Bozdağ	4 February 2015	4.87
9	9	"Büyük Rüya"	Metin Günay	Mehmet Bozdağ, Atilla Engin, Mustafa Burak Doğu, Hale Aksu Engin, Alp Emre Oduncu and Aslı Zeynep Peker Bozdağ	18 February 2015	5.71
10	10	"Diriliş Vakti"	Metin Günay	Mehmet Bozdağ, Atilla Engin and Aslı Zeynep Peker Bozdağ	25 February 2015	5.61
11	11	"Hain Kim?"	Metin Günay	Mehmet Bozdağ, Atilla Engin and Aslı Zeynep Peker Bozdağ	4 March 2015	6.44
12	12	"Gönlümüz Halep"	Metin Günay	Mehmet Bozdağ, Atilla Engin and Aslı Zeynep Peker Bozdağ	11 March 2015	5.72
13	13	"Bedrin Aslanları"	Metin Günay	Mehmet Bozdağ, Atilla Engin and Aslı Zeynep Peker Bozdağ	18 March 2015	5.28
14	14	"Gün Birlik Günü"	Metin Günay	Mehmet Bozdağ, Atilla Engin and Aslı Zeynep Peker Bozdağ	25 March 2015	5.50
15	15	"Adalet Ordusu"	Metin Günay	Mehmet Bozdağ, Atilla Engin and Aslı Zeynep Peker Bozdağ	1 April 2015	5.62
16	16	"Davamız"	Metin Günay	Mehmet Bozdağ, Atilla Engin and Aslı Zeynep Peker Bozdağ	8 April 2015	5.31
17	17	"Er Meydanı"	Metin Günay	Mehmet Bozdağ, Atilla Engin and Aslı Zeynep Peker Bozdağ	15 April 2015	5.30
18	18	"Diriliş İçin"	Metin Günay	Mehmet Bozdağ, Atilla Engin and Aslı Zeynep Peker Bozdağ	22 April 2015	5.98
19	19	"Beylik Zamanı"	Metin Günay	Mehmet Bozdağ, Atilla Engin and Aslı Zeynep Peker Bozdağ	29 April 2015	5.37
20	20	"Büyük Oyun"	Metin Günay	Mehmet Bozdağ, Atilla Engin and Aslı Zeynep Peker Bozdağ	6 May 2015	5.76
21	21	"Zulüm Devam Etmez"	Metin Günay	Mehmet Bozdağ, Atilla Engin and Aslı Zeynep Peker Bozdağ	13 May 2015	6.02
22	22	"Zafer Günü, Part 1"	Metin Günay	Mehmet Bozdağ, Atilla Engin and Aslı Zeynep Peker Bozdağ	20 May 2015	6.42
23	23	"Zafer Günü, Part 2"	Metin Günay	Mehmet Bozdağ, Atilla Engin and Aslı Zeynep Peker Bozdağ	27 May 2015	5.51
24	24	"Kutlu Fetih"	Metin Günay	Mehmet Bozdağ, Atilla Engin and Aslı Zeynep Peker Bozdağ	3 June 2015	5.21
25	25	"Milletin Dirilişi, Part 1"	Metin Günay	Mehmet Bozdağ, Atilla Engin and Aslı Zeynep Peker Bozdağ	10 June 2015	4.87
26	26	"Milletin Dirilişi, Part 2"	Metin Günay	Mehmet Bozdağ, Atilla Engin and Aslı Zeynep Peker Bozdağ	17 June 2015	4.06

=== Season 2 (2015–16) ===
The Kayı, settled in Erzurum, seek refuge with the Dodurga after the Mongols, led by Baycu Noyan, massacre half their tribe. This leads to Ertuğrul facing Tuğtekin, his cousin, who is jealous of him along with Gündoğdu again who is misled by the big threat within the Dodurga; Aytolun and her brother Gümüştekin. Aytolun married Tuğtekin's father, Korkut Bey, so that she could help Gümüştekin become the margrave of all the Turkmen tribes with the help of Emir Sadettin after killing Korkut. Only Selcan is aware of this threat and constantly attempts to warn Gündoğdu, who ignores her for her misdeeds in the past. Along with these schemes, Kocabaş, Tuğtekin's alp who works for Baycu Noyan, turns Tuğtekin against Ertuğrul making their relationship worse but is later killed by Ertuğrul, and his relations with Tuğtekin gradually improves. Aytolun and Gümüştekin are killed after their treachery is caught when Selcan's words are listened to and Korkut is killed. Noyan is supposedly killed by Ertuğrul after the death of Tuğtekin and the tribe is split between 1000 migrating to Ahlat with Gündoğdu and 400 migrating to Western Anatolia with Ertuğrul.

No. overall	No. in season	Title	Directed by	Written by	Original release date	Turkey viewers (millions)
27	1	"Bir Karış Toprak Vermeyiz"	Metin Günay	Mehmet Bozdağ, Atilla Engin & Aslı Zeynep Peker Bozdağ	30 September 2015	5.27
28	2	"Boyun Eğmeyeceğiz"	Metin Günay	Mehmet Bozdağ, Atilla Engin & Aslı Zeynep Peker Bozdağ	7 October 2015	6.01
29	3	"Birlik Vakti"	Metin Günay	Mehmet Bozdağ, Atilla Engin & Aslı Zeynep Peker Bozdağ	14 October 2015	6.33
30	4	"Beklenen Kahraman"	Metin Günay	Mehmet Bozdağ, Atilla Engin & Aslı Zeynep Peker Bozdağ	21 October 2015	6.81
31	5	"Yalnız Değilsin"	Metin Günay	Mehmet Bozdağ, Atilla Engin & Aslı Zeynep Peker Bozdağ	28 October 2015	7.17
32	6	"Kutlu Uyanış"	Metin Günay	Mehmet Bozdağ, Atilla Engin & Aslı Zeynep Peker Bozdağ	4 November 2015	6.74
33	7	"Diriliş Günü, Part 1"	Metin Günay	Mehmet Bozdağ, Atilla Engin & Aslı Zeynep Peker Bozdağ	11 November 2015	7.23
34	8	"Diriliş Günü, Part 2"	Metin Günay	Mehmet Bozdağ, Atilla Engin & Aslı Zeynep Peker Bozdağ	18 November 2015	7.66
35	9	"Yalnız Değilsin"	Metin Günay	Mehmet Bozdağ, Atilla Engin & Aslı Zeynep Peker Bozdağ	25 November 2015	7.15
36	10	"Diriliş Ateşi"	Metin Günay	Mehmet Bozdağ, Atilla Engin & Aslı Zeynep Peker Bozdağ	2 December 2015	8.08
37	11	"Beklenen Şafak"	Metin Günay	Mehmet Bozdağ, Atilla Engin & Aslı Zeynep Peker Bozdağ	9 December 2015	8.60
38	12	"Milletim İçin"	Metin Günay	Mehmet Bozdağ, Atilla Engin & Aslı Zeynep Peker Bozdağ	16 December 2015	8.90
39	13	"İhanetin Bedeli"	Metin Günay	Mehmet Bozdağ, Atilla Engin & Aslı Zeynep Peker Bozdağ	23 December 2015	9.11
40	14	"Baş Koydum"	Metin Günay	Mehmet Bozdağ, Atilla Engin & Aslı Zeynep Peker Bozdağ	30 December 2015	9.20
41	15	"Allah Var Gam Yok"	Metin Günay	Mehmet Bozdağ, Atilla Engin & Aslı Zeynep Peker Bozdağ	13 January 2016	9.48
42	16	"Hilalin Gölgesinde"	Metin Günay	Mehmet Bozdağ, Atilla Engin & Aslı Zeynep Peker Bozdağ	20 January 2016	9.86
43	17	"Kutlu Fetih"	Metin Günay	Mehmet Bozdağ, Atilla Engin & Aslı Zeynep Peker Bozdağ	27 January 2016	9.37
44	18	"Zaferin Şerefi"	Metin Günay	Mehmet Bozdağ, Atilla Engin & Aslı Zeynep Peker Bozdağ	3 February 2016	8.87
45	19	"Sefer Bizim Zafer Allah'ındır"	Metin Günay	Mehmet Bozdağ, Atilla Engin & Aslı Zeynep Peker Bozdağ	10 February 2016	9.24
46	20	"Hak ile Batılın Savaşı"	Metin Günay	Mehmet Bozdağ, Atilla Engin & Aslı Zeynep Peker Bozdağ	17 February 2016	9.65
47	21	"Hakkın Sesi"	Metin Günay	Mehmet Bozdağ, Atilla Engin & Aslı Zeynep Peker Bozdağ	24 February 2016	9.31
48	22	"Fetih Ateşi"	Metin Günay	Mehmet Bozdağ, Atilla Engin & Aslı Zeynep Peker Bozdağ	2 March 2016	9.21
49	23	"Kirli Oyun"	Metin Günay	Mehmet Bozdağ, Atilla Engin & Aslı Zeynep Peker Bozdağ	9 March 2016	9.93
50	24	"Büyük Mücadele"	Metin Günay	Mehmet Bozdağ, Atilla Engin & Aslı Zeynep Peker Bozdağ	16 March 2016	9.67
51	25	"Fırsat Vermeyeceğiz"	Metin Günay	Mehmet Bozdağ, Atilla Engin & Aslı Zeynep Peker Bozdağ	23 March 2016	9.92
52	26	"Adalet Vakti"	Metin Günay	Mehmet Bozdağ, Atilla Engin & Aslı Zeynep Peker Bozdağ	30 March 2016	9.99
53	27	"Kutlu Gün"	Metin Günay	Mehmet Bozdağ, Atilla Engin & Aslı Zeynep Peker Bozdağ	6 April 2016	10.41
54	28	"Gaza Yolu"	Metin Günay	Mehmet Bozdağ, Atilla Engin & Aslı Zeynep Peker Bozdağ	13 April 2016	9.13
55	29	"Hak Yolu"	Metin Günay	Mehmet Bozdağ, Atilla Engin & Aslı Zeynep Peker Bozdağ	20 April 2016	8.87
56	30	"Adalet Oyunu"	Metin Günay	Mehmet Bozdağ, Atilla Engin & Aslı Zeynep Peker Bozdağ	27 April 2016	9.34
57	31	"Devletin İstikbali"	Metin Günay	Mehmet Bozdağ, Atilla Engin & Aslı Zeynep Peker Bozdağ	4 May 2016	9.06
58	32	"Bizim Yolumuz"	Metin Günay	Mehmet Bozdağ, Atilla Engin & Aslı Zeynep Peker Bozdağ	11 May 2016	9.58
59	33	"Devletin Bekası"	Metin Günay	Mehmet Bozdağ, Atilla Engin & Aslı Zeynep Peker Bozdağ	25 May 2016	8.93
60	34	"Kutlu Mücadele, Part 1"	Metin Günay	Mehmet Bozdağ, Atilla Engin & Aslı Zeynep Peker Bozdağ	1 June 2016	8.77
61	35	"Kutlu Mücadele, Part 2"	Metin Günay	Mehmet Bozdağ, Atilla Engin & Aslı Zeynep Peker Bozdağ	8 June 2016	9.00

=== Season 3 (2016–17) ===
The poor Kayı newcomers face Ural of the rich Çavdar trade-veterans. Although Ural isn't the Bey of his tribe, he seeks more and more power, becoming jealous of the Kayı whenever something good happens to the small tribe. Meanwhile, the Templars who have infiltrated Hanlı Pazar, led by Hancı Simon, seek to kill Ertuğrul as he did to the Templars years back. Ertuğrul defeats Hancı Simon and conquers Hanlı Pazar, leaving Ural more jealous than ever. When Ural is accused of killing the Tekfur of Karacahisar, Andros, and causing problems for the Kayı, Ural is sentenced to death, however, he is saved by the devious Emir Sadettin. After the death of Candar, the Çavdar Bey, and Ural's father, Ural seeks help from the new Tekfur of Karacahisar, Vasilius, who wants to rid the Turks of the land, but is killed by Ertuğrul in an attempt to become the Bey of the Çavdar. When Vasilius attempts to ambush the Selçuk Sultan, he fails and is killed by Ertuğrul. Because of this, the Sultan makes Ertuğrul the Uç Bey angering Emir Sadettin, who vows to end Ertuğrul. At the end of the season, Ertuğrul falls into an ambush set by the new Tekfur of Karacahisar, Ares.

No. overall	No. in season	Title	Directed by	Written by	Original release date	Turkey viewers (millions)
62	1	"Bir Milletin Dirilişi (Note: transl. "Resurrection of a Nation")"	Metin Günay	Mehmet Bozdağ, Atilla Engin & Aslı Zeynep Peker Bozdağ	26 October 2016	11.19
63	2	"Fetih Vaktidir (Note: transl. "Time for Conquest")"	Metin Günay	Mehmet Bozdağ, Atilla Engin & Aslı Zeynep Peker Bozdağ	2 November 2016	9.59
64	3	"Hakikatin Pesinde, Part 1 (Note: transl. "In Pursuit of the Truth, Part 1")"	Metin Günay	Mehmet Bozdağ, Atilla Engin & Aslı Zeynep Peker Bozdağ	9 November 2016	10.12
65	4	"Hakikatin Pesinde, Part 2 (Note: transl. "In Pursuit of the Truth, Part 2")"	Metin Günay	Mehmet Bozdağ, Atilla Engin & Aslı Zeynep Peker Bozdağ	16 November 2016	11.42
66	5	"Diriliş Ruhu (Note: transl. "The Soul of Resurrection")"	Metin Günay	Mehmet Bozdağ, Atilla Engin & Aslı Zeynep Peker Bozdağ	23 November 2016	10.83
67	6	"Birlik Zamanı (Note: transl. "Time for Unity")"	Metin Günay	Mehmet Bozdağ, Atilla Engin & Aslı Zeynep Peker Bozdağ	30 November 2016	11.68
68	7	"Kutlu Dava (Note: transl. "A Blessed Cause")"	Metin Günay	Mehmet Bozdağ, Atilla Engin & Aslı Zeynep Peker Bozdağ	7 December 2016	11.69
69	8	"İntikam Günü (Note: transl. "The Day of Vengeance")"	Metin Günay	Mehmet Bozdağ, Atilla Engin & Aslı Zeynep Peker Bozdağ	14 December 2016	13.71
70	9	"Kutlu Zafer (Note: transl. "A Blessed Victory")"	Metin Günay	Mehmet Bozdağ, Atilla Engin & Aslı Zeynep Peker Bozdağ	21 December 2016	13.17
71	10	"Fetih Içın (Note: transl. "For Conquest")"	Metin Günay	Mehmet Bozdağ, Atilla Engin & Aslı Zeynep Peker Bozdağ	28 December 2016	12.62
72	11	"Beyimizin Yolunda (Note: transl. "On our Bey's Path")"	Metin Günay	Mehmet Bozdağ, Atilla Engin & Aslı Zeynep Peker Bozdağ	11 January 2017	12.9
73	12	"Bir Ölür Bin Diriliriz (Note: transl. "If One Dies, a Thousand Will Rise")"	Metin Günay	Mehmet Bozdağ, Atilla Engin & Aslı Zeynep Peker Bozdağ	18 January 2017	13.21
74	13	"Zafere Doğru (Note: transl. "A Proper Victory")"	Metin Günay	Mehmet Bozdağ, Atilla Engin & Aslı Zeynep Peker Bozdağ	25 January 2017	12.42
75	14	"Hesap Günü (Note: transl. "Day of Reckoning")"	Metin Günay	Mehmet Bozdağ, Atilla Engin & Aslı Zeynep Peker Bozdağ	1 February 2017	12.61
76	15	"İlahi Adalet (Note: transl. "Divine Justice")"	Metin Günay	Mehmet Bozdağ, Atilla Engin & Aslı Zeynep Peker Bozdağ	8 February 2017	12.45
77	16	"Adalet Tecelli Edecek (Note: transl. "Justice will be Served")"	Metin Günay	Mehmet Bozdağ, Atilla Engin & Aslı Zeynep Peker Bozdağ	15 February 2017	12.88
78	17	"Davamız Bir (Note: transl. "Our Cause is One")"	Metin Günay	Mehmet Bozdağ, Atilla Engin & Aslı Zeynep Peker Bozdağ	22 February 2017	12.9
79	18	"Kimiz Biz (Note: transl. "Who We Are")"	Metin Günay	Mehmet Bozdağ, Atilla Engin & Aslı Zeynep Peker Bozdağ	8 March 2017	12.53
80	19	"Yemin Ettik (Note: transl. "We Swore an Oath")"	Metin Günay	Mehmet Bozdağ, Atilla Engin & Aslı Zeynep Peker Bozdağ	15 March 2017	13.42
81	20	"Gayemiz (Note: transl. "Our Aim")"	Metin Günay	Mehmet Bozdağ, Atilla Engin & Aslı Zeynep Peker Bozdağ	22 March 2017	13.27
82	21	"Birlikte Yürümek (Note: transl. "We Walk United")"	Metin Günay	Mehmet Bozdağ, Atilla Engin & Aslı Zeynep Peker Bozdağ	29 March 2017	12.86
83	22	"Zalimler İçin Yaşasın Cehennem (Note: transl. "Long Live Hell for Tyrants")"	Metin Günay	Mehmet Bozdağ, Atilla Engin & Aslı Zeynep Peker Bozdağ	5 April 2017	14.12
84	23	"İyi (Note: transl. "Good")"	Metin Günay	Mehmet Bozdağ, Atilla Engin & Aslı Zeynep Peker Bozdağ	12 April 2017	13.87
85	24	"Kötü (Note: transl. "Bad")"	Metin Günay	Mehmet Bozdağ, Atilla Engin & Aslı Zeynep Peker Bozdağ	19 April 2017	14.38
86	25	"Allah İyiliği Destekler (Note: transl. "Allah gives goodness")"	Metin Günay	Mehmet Bozdağ, Atilla Engin & Aslı Zeynep Peker Bozdağ	3 May 2017	13.81
87	26	"Vasilius"	Metin Günay	Mehmet Bozdağ, Atilla Engin & Aslı Zeynep Peker Bozdağ	10 May 2017	11.03
88	27	"Daha Yüksek, Part 1 (Note: transl. "Even Higher, Part 1")"	Metin Günay	Mehmet Bozdağ, Atilla Engin & Aslı Zeynep Peker Bozdağ	17 May 2017	12.13
89	28	"Daha Yüksek, Part 2 (Note: transl. "Even Higher, Part 2")"	Metin Günay	Mehmet Bozdağ, Atilla Engin & Aslı Zeynep Peker Bozdağ	31 May 2017	10.85
90	29	"Bir Köpek Bir Köpektir (Note: transl. "A 'Köpek' (transl. 'dog') is a 'Köpek' ")"	Metin Günay	Mehmet Bozdağ, Atilla Engin & Aslı Zeynep Peker Bozdağ	7 June 2017	10.31
91	30	"Mutluluktan Sonra Umutsuzluk (Note: transl. "After Happiness, Despair")"	Metin Günay	Mehmet Bozdağ, Atilla Engin & Aslı Zeynep Peker Bozdağ	14 June 2017	9.6

=== Season 4 (2017–18) ===
It is believed that Ertuğrul is dead despite the truth being that he is actually captured by some slave traders. Meanwhile, Emir Sadettin convinces Dündar, Ertuğrul's brother and the new Kayı Bey, into selling Hanlı Pazar and moving back to Gündoğdu's tribe but is stopped upon Ertuğrul's return and is forthwith banished. After Ertuğrul's son, Gündüz, is kidnapped, Ertuğrul declares war against Karacahisar and is successful in conquering it. Following Ares' capture, Ertuğrul takes him to the Sultan and tells him to confess to the Sultan about Sadettin Köpek's misdeeds. The plan nearly works but Köpek is saved by the Sultan's wife, Mahperi, and leads to an event turning Ares, later killed by Noyan, into a Muslim. Soon after that, the Sultan is killed and Köpek's increase in power in the palace creates problems for the new Sultan, Gıyaseddin. Gıyaseddin allies with Ertuğrul and with the help of Hüsamettin Karaca, Köpek is beheaded. After this, Ertuğrul faces the return of Noyan but is successful in defeating him and his devious sister, Alangoya, who attempted to kill Ertuğrul's son, Osman, who was born on the same day as his mother's death. Noyan prepares for a battle, historically known as the Battle of Köse Dağ and the Kayı move to Söğüt.

No. overall	No. in season	Title	Directed by	Written by	Original release date	Turkey viewers (millions)
92	1	"Yalancı (Note: transl. "Liar")"	Metin Günay	Mehmet Bozdağ, Atilla Engin & Aslı Zeynep Peker Bozdağ	25 October 2017	13.04
93	2	"Köleler (Note: transl. "Slaves")"	Metin Günay	Mehmet Bozdağ, Atilla Engin & Aslı Zeynep Peker Bozdağ	1 November 2017	12.98
94	3	"Beceriksiz Bey (Note: transl. "Incompetent Bey")"	Metin Günay	Mehmet Bozdağ, Atilla Engin & Aslı Zeynep Peker Bozdağ	8 November 2017	13.66
95	4	"Diriliş Ertuğrul Vakti (Note: transl. "Time for Diriliş: Ertuğrul")"	Metin Günay	Mehmet Bozdağ, Atilla Engin & Aslı Zeynep Peker Bozdağ	15 November 2017	14.68
96	5	"Hayatta olduğu İçin Sevin (Note: transl. "Rejoice Because He Is Alive")"	Metin Günay	Mehmet Bozdağ, Atilla Engin & Aslı Zeynep Peker Bozdağ	22 November 2017	16.4
97	6	"Titan"	Metin Günay	Mehmet Bozdağ, Atilla Engin & Aslı Zeynep Peker Bozdağ	29 November 2017	14.79
98	7	"Evlilik (Note: transl. "Marriage")"	Metin Günay	Mehmet Bozdağ, Atilla Engin & Aslı Zeynep Peker Bozdağ	6 December 2017	16.52
99	8	"Ödlek (Note: transl. "Coward")"	Metin Günay	Mehmet Bozdağ, Atilla Engin & Aslı Zeynep Peker Bozdağ	20 December 2017	16.69
100	9	"Müzakere (Note: transl. "Discussion")"	Metin Günay	Mehmet Bozdağ, Atilla Engin & Aslı Zeynep Peker Bozdağ	27 December 2017	16.73
101	10	"İyi Kötü ve Bahadır (Note: transl. "Good, Bad and Bahadır")"	Metin Günay	Mehmet Bozdağ, Atilla Engin & Aslı Zeynep Peker Bozdağ	10 January 2018	16.03
102	11	"Yeni Bir Hainin Sonu (Note: transl. "The End of Another Traitor")"	Metin Günay	Mehmet Bozdağ, Atilla Engin & Aslı Zeynep Peker Bozdağ	17 January 2018	17
103	12	"Büyük Zafer (Note: transl. "Great Victory")"	Metin Günay	Mehmet Bozdağ, Atilla Engin & Aslı Zeynep Peker Bozdağ	24 January 2018	16.38
104	13	"Allah'ın Kanunları, Allah'ın Adaleti (Note: transl. "Allah's Laws, Allah's Justice")"	Metin Günay	Mehmet Bozdağ, Atilla Engin & Aslı Zeynep Peker Bozdağ	31 January 2018	14.94
105	14	"Yeni Sorun (Note: transl. "A New Problem")"	Metin Günay	Mehmet Bozdağ, Atilla Engin & Aslı Zeynep Peker Bozdağ	7 February 2018	14.62
106	15	"Zalim Köpek (Note: transl. "Cruel Köpek")"	Metin Günay	Mehmet Bozdağ, Atilla Engin & Aslı Zeynep Peker Bozdağ	14 February 2018	14.69
107	16	"Ares ve Saadettin (Note: transl. "Ares and Sadettin")"	Metin Günay	Mehmet Bozdağ, Atilla Engin & Aslı Zeynep Peker Bozdağ	21 February 2018	14.47
108	17	"Ahmet, Ares Değil (Note: transl. "Ahmet, not Ares")"	Metin Günay	Mehmet Bozdağ, Atilla Engin & Aslı Zeynep Peker Bozdağ	28 February 2018	15.13
109	18	"Zalim İçin Güzel Bir Gün (Note: transl. "A Great Day for the Cruel")"	Metin Günay	Mehmet Bozdağ, Atilla Engin & Aslı Zeynep Peker Bozdağ	7 March 2018	15.61
110	19	"Saray Kahramanı (Note: transl. "The Hero of the Palace")"	Metin Günay	Mehmet Bozdağ, Atilla Engin & Aslı Zeynep Peker Bozdağ	14 March 2018	15.06
111	20	"Hata (Note: transl. "Mistake")"	Metin Günay	Mehmet Bozdağ, Atilla Engin & Aslı Zeynep Peker Bozdağ	21 March 2018	14.81
112	21	"Bir Şey Yanlış (Note: transl. "Something is Wrong")"	Metin Günay	Mehmet Bozdağ, Atilla Engin & Aslı Zeynep Peker Bozdağ	28 March 2018	13.9
113	22	"Ah Aslıhan Ah"	Metin Günay	Mehmet Bozdağ, Atilla Engin & Aslı Zeynep Peker Bozdağ	4 April 2018	14.66
114	23	"İyi Hainler (Note: transl. "Good Traitors")"	Metin Günay	Mehmet Bozdağ, Atilla Engin & Aslı Zeynep Peker Bozdağ	11 April 2018	14.6
115	24	"Köpeğin Sonu (Note: transl. "The End of Köpek")"	Metin Günay	Mehmet Bozdağ, Atilla Engin & Aslı Zeynep Peker Bozdağ	18 April 2018	14.99
116	25	"Halime oğlu Osman (Note: transl. "Halime's son Osman")"	Metin Günay	Mehmet Bozdağ, Atilla Engin & Aslı Zeynep Peker Bozdağ	2 May 2018	12.62
117	26	"Yeni Sorun (Note: transl. "A New Problem")"	Metin Günay	Mehmet Bozdağ, Atilla Engin & Aslı Zeynep Peker Bozdağ	9 May 2018	13.11
118	27	"Moğollar (Note: transl. "Mongols")"	Metin Günay	Mehmet Bozdağ, Atilla Engin & Aslı Zeynep Peker Bozdağ	16 February 2018	10.77
119	28	"Süt Anne (Note: transl. "Milk Mother")"	Metin Günay	Mehmet Bozdağ, Atilla Engin & Aslı Zeynep Peker Bozdağ	23 May 2018	9.97
120	29	"Barış Konuşmaları (Note: transl. "Peace Talks")"	Metin Günay	Mehmet Bozdağ, Atilla Engin & Aslı Zeynep Peker Bozdağ	30 May 2018	10.51
121	30	"Anadolu Planları (Note: transl. "Anatolian Plans")"	Metin Günay	Mehmet Bozdağ, Atilla Engin & Aslı Zeynep Peker Bozdağ	6 June 2018	9.69

=== Season 5 (2018–19) ===
After 10 years in Söğüt, in a Mongol-controlled Selçuk state, Ertuğrul faces many Mongol commanders including Alıncak and Subutai, along with the Selçuk assassin working with the Mongols, Beybolat. Beybolat is disguised with the name, Albastı, and he arrives following the death of his father, Umur Bey, Bey of the Umuroğlu tribe, who was sent to become the new tax collector of Söğüt. Umur Bey was killed by the disgraced Byzantine commander, Dragos, disguised as the Söğüt Zangoç (transl. bellringer), who seeks to take over the town. Beybolat, who becomes his father's successor, and Dragos, who takes control over Lefke Castle after killing the innocent Tekfur Yannis, cause many problems for Ertuğrul including Beybolat's control over Söğüt for a while. İlbilge, Beybolat's sister, is the only person in her family supporting justice, with her help, Ertuğrul, defeats and kills both Beybolat and Dragos. Following Beybolat's death, Ertuğrul faces Arikbuka, a feared Mongol spy and Alıncak's blood brother, along with the spy, Qiyat, who works for Hulagu against Berke, Ertuğrul's ally and the Han of the Golden Horde. The season ends with the death of Arikbuka and Qiyat along with Ertuğrul's marriage to İlbilge Hatun.

No. overall	No. in season	Title	Directed by	Written by	Original release date	Turkey viewers (millions)
122	1	"Sırlar Yıllarda Burada"	Metin Günay	Mehmet Bozdağ, Atilla Engin & Aslı Zeynep Peker Bozdağ	7 November 2018	14.84
123	2	"Episode 123"	Metin Günay	Mehmet Bozdağ, Atilla Engin & Aslı Zeynep Peker Bozdağ	14 November 2018	14.71
124	3	"Episode 124"	Metin Günay	Mehmet Bozdağ, Atilla Engin & Aslı Zeynep Peker Bozdağ	21 November 2018	15.71
125	4	"Episode 125"	Metin Günay	Mehmet Bozdağ, Atilla Engin & Aslı Zeynep Peker Bozdağ	28 November 2018	14.33
126	5	"Episode 126"	Metin Günay	Mehmet Bozdağ, Atilla Engin & Aslı Zeynep Peker Bozdağ	5 December 2018	15.19
127	6	"Episode 127"	Metin Günay	Mehmet Bozdağ, Atilla Engin & Aslı Zeynep Peker Bozdağ	12 December 2018	15.33
128	7	"Episode 128"	Metin Günay	Mehmet Bozdağ, Atilla Engin & Aslı Zeynep Peker Bozdağ	19 December 2018	15.47
129	8	"Episode 129"	Metin Günay	Mehmet Bozdağ, Atilla Engin & Aslı Zeynep Peker Bozdağ	26 December 2018	15.48
130	9	"Episode 130"	Metin Günay	Mehmet Bozdağ, Atilla Engin & Aslı Zeynep Peker Bozdağ	2 January 2019	16.47
131	10	"Episode 131"	Metin Günay	Mehmet Bozdağ, Atilla Engin & Aslı Zeynep Peker Bozdağ	16 January 2019	16.44
132	11	"Episode 132"	Metin Günay	Mehmet Bozdağ, Atilla Engin & Aslı Zeynep Peker Bozdağ	23 January 2019	14.83
133	12	"Episode 133"	Metin Günay	Mehmet Bozdağ, Atilla Engin & Aslı Zeynep Peker Bozdağ	30 January 2019	15.27
134	13	"Episode 134"	Metin Günay	Mehmet Bozdağ, Atilla Engin & Aslı Zeynep Peker Bozdağ	6 February 2019	14.95
135	14	"Episode 135"	Metin Günay	Mehmet Bozdağ, Atilla Engin & Aslı Zeynep Peker Bozdağ	13 February 2019	15.73
136	15	"Episode 136"	Metin Günay	Mehmet Bozdağ, Atilla Engin & Aslı Zeynep Peker Bozdağ	20 February 2019	15.32
137	16	"Episode 137"	Metin Günay	Mehmet Bozdağ, Atilla Engin & Aslı Zeynep Peker Bozdağ	27 February 2019	16.02
138	17	"Episode 138"	Metin Günay	Mehmet Bozdağ, Atilla Engin & Aslı Zeynep Peker Bozdağ	6 March 2019	15.85
139	18	"Episode 139"	Metin Günay	Mehmet Bozdağ, Atilla Engin & Aslı Zeynep Peker Bozdağ	13 March 2019	15.18
140	19	"Episode 140"	Metin Günay	Mehmet Bozdağ, Atilla Engin & Aslı Zeynep Peker Bozdağ	20 March 2019	15.49
141	20	"Episode 141"	Metin Günay	Mehmet Bozdağ, Atilla Engin & Aslı Zeynep Peker Bozdağ	27 March 2019	14.67
142	21	"Episode 142"	Metin Günay	Mehmet Bozdağ, Atilla Engin & Aslı Zeynep Peker Bozdağ	3 April 2019	15.31
143	22	"Episode 143"	Metin Günay	Mehmet Bozdağ, Atilla Engin & Aslı Zeynep Peker Bozdağ	10 April 2019	15.20
144	23	"Episode 144"	Metin Günay	Mehmet Bozdağ, Atilla Engin & Aslı Zeynep Peker Bozdağ	17 April 2019	15.36
145	24	"Episode 145"	Metin Günay	Mehmet Bozdağ, Atilla Engin & Aslı Zeynep Peker Bozdağ	24 April 2019	14.55
146	25	"Episode 146"	Metin Günay	Mehmet Bozdağ, Atilla Engin & Aslı Zeynep Peker Bozdağ	1 May 2019	14.20
147	26	"Episode 147"	Metin Günay	Mehmet Bozdağ, Atilla Engin & Aslı Zeynep Peker Bozdağ	8 May 2019	13.92
148	27	"Episode 148"	Metin Günay	Mehmet Bozdağ, Atilla Engin & Aslı Zeynep Peker Bozdağ	15 May 2019	11.68
149	28	"Episode 149"	Metin Günay	Mehmet Bozdağ, Atilla Engin & Aslı Zeynep Peker Bozdağ	22 May 2019	11.87
150	29	"Diriliş"	Metin Günay	Mehmet Bozdağ, Atilla Engin & Aslı Zeynep Peker Bozdağ	29 May 2019	11.44

== See also ==
- List of Diriliş: Ertuğrul characters
- List of Kuruluş: Osman episodes
- List of awards and nominations received by Diriliş: Ertuğrul
