= List of awards and nominations received by Diriliş: Ertuğrul =

List of Diriliş: Ertuğrul awards and nominations
Awards and nominations
Award	Wins	Nominations
Magazinci Awards	3	1
Turkey Youth Awards	8	5
Golden Butterfly Awards	1	3
Golden Palm Awards	5	0
KTU Media Awards	3	0
International Snow Film Festival	7	0
Turquoise Butterfly Awards	5	0
Quality of Magazine Awards	5	0
Makinistanbul Media, Art and Sports Awards	1	0
Tax Inspectors Association Achievement Awards	2	0
Mimar Sinan Fine Arts High School Awards	1	0
Social Awareness Awards	6	0
Anatolia Media Awards	8	0
Distinctive International Arab Festivals Awards (DIAFA)	1	0
Indian Television Academy Awards	1	0
Pakistan International Screen Awards	2	0
SleekAsian London Awards	2	0

Totals (Note: Certain award groups do not simply award one winner. They acknowledge several different recipients, have runners-up, and have third place. Since this is a specific recognition and is different from losing an award, runner-up mentions are considered wins in this award tally. For simplification and to avoid errors, each award in this list has been presumed to have had a prior nomination.)
- Wins: 61
- Nominations: 9

Diriliş: Ertuğrul (transl. Resurrection: Ertuğrul), is a Turkish historical fiction and adventure television series, created by Mehmet Bozdağ, starring Engin Altan Düzyatan in the title role. The successful series has won many awards. Engin Altan Düzyatan won 25 awards with 5 International Awards. Below is a list of awards and nominations received by Diriliş: Ertuğrul.

== Distinctive International Arab Festivals Awards (DIAFA) ==
Year	Nominee	Category	Result	Ref.
2019	Distinctive International Arab Festivals Awards (DIAFA)	Engin Altan Düzyatan	Best International Actor	

== Turquoise Butterfly Awards ==
Year	Nominee	Category	Result	Ref.
2015	Engin Altan Düzyatan	Best Actor of the Year	Won	
2015	Didem Balcin	Best Actresses of the Year	Won	
2015	Metin Gunay	Best Director of the Year	Won	
2015	Diriliş: Ertuğrul	Best Script of the Year	Won	
2015	Diriliş: Ertuğrul	TV series of the year	Won	

== International Snow Film Festival ==
Year	Nominee	Category	Result	Ref.
2016	Engin Altan Düzyatan	Best TV Series Actor	Won	
2016	Didem Balçin	Best TV Actress	Won	
2016	Nurettin Sönmez	Best Supporting TV Actor	Won	
2016	Metin Günay	Best Director	Won	
2016	Mehmet Bozdağ	Best Screenwriter	Won	
2016	Diriliş: Ertuğrul	Best TV Series	Won	
2016	Cengiz Coşkun	Best Supporting Actor in a TV Series	Won	

== Magazinci Awards ==
Year	Nominee	Category	Result	Ref.
2016	Engin Altan Düzyatan	Male TV Series Actor of the Year	Won	
2016	Diriliş: Ertuğrul	Term Series of the Year	Won	
2016	Metin Gunay	Best Director of the Year	Won	

== Turkey Youth Awards ==
Year	Nominee	Category	Result	Ref.
2017	Engin Altan Düzyatan	Best TV Series Actor	Nominated	
2017	Esra Bilgiç	Best TV Actress	Nominated	
2017	Didem Balçin	Best TV Actress	Nominated	
2017	Nurettin Sönmez	Best Supporting TV Actor	Nominated	
2017	Metin Günay	Best Director	Nominated	
2017	Mehmet Bozdağ	Best Screenwriter	Won	
2017	Diriliş: Ertuğrul	Best TV Series	Won	
2017	Cengiz Coşkun	Best Supporting Actor in a TV Series	Won	

== Golden Butterfly Awards ==
Year	Nominee	Category	Result	Ref.
2016	Engin Altan Düzyatan	The Best Actor	Nominated	
2016	Metin Günay	Best Director of the Year	Nominated	
2016	Diriliş: Ertuğrul	Best TV Series of the Year	Won	
2017	Diriliş: Ertuğrul	Best TV Series	Nominated	

== Turkey Golden Palm Awards ==
Year	Nominee	Category	Result	Ref.
2016	Diriliş: Ertuğrul	TV series of the year	Won	
2016	Ayberk Pekcan	Supporting TV Series Actor of the Year	Won	
2016	Metin Günay	TV Series Director of the Year	Won	
2016	Engin Altan Düzyatan	Male TV Series Actor of the Year	Won	
2017	Metin Günay	TV Series Director of the Year	Won	

== Other awards ==
Year	Award	Nominee	Category	Result	Ref.
2015	Quality of Magazine Awards	Engin Altan Düzyatan	Actor Award	Won	
2016	Makinistanbul Media, Art and Sports Awards	Engin Altan Düzyatan	Best TV Series Actor	Won	
2016	Mimar Sinan Fine Arts High School Awards	Engin Altan Düzyatan	Most Successful Actor of the Year	Won	
2016	Social Awareness Awards	Esra Bilgiç	Best TV Series Actress	Won	
2016	Anatolia Media Awards	Esra Bilgiç	TV Series Actress of the Year	Won	
2016	KTU Media Awards	Engin Altan Düzyatan	Best Favourite Actor	Won	
2016	KTU Media Awards	Mehmet Bozdağ	Favourite Production and Screenplay	Won	
2016	KTU Media Awards	Metin Gunay	Favourite Director	Won	
2019	Tax Inspectors Association Achievement Awards	Engin Altan Düzyatan	The Most Successful Actor	Won	
2019	Tax Inspectors Association Achievement Awards	Dirilis Ertugrul	The Most Successful Series	Won	
2022	SleekAsian British Magazine Awards	Engin Altan Düzyatan	Best Actor	Won	
2022	SleekAsian British Magazine Awards	Kemal Tekden	Best Producer	Won	

== See also ==
- List of Diriliş: Ertuğrul episodes
- List of Diriliş: Ertuğrul characters
- List of awards and nominations received by Kuruluş: Osman
