= Metin Günay =

Turkish director

- Born: 26 January 1963 (age 63); Isparta, Turkey
- Education: Yıldız Technical University
- Occupation: Director
- Years active: 1993–present

Hakkı Metin Günay (born 26 January 1963) is a Turkish director. His most well-known works are Deli Yürek (1998), Ekmek Teknesi (2002) and Diriliş: Ertuğrul (2014). He graduated from the Yıldız Technical University and has directed 12 series so far along with some films. Whereas, Günay also starred as an actor in a TV series.

== Filmography ==
Year	Film	Functioned as				Notes
Year	Film	Actor	director	Art director	Producer	Notes
1992	Kapıları Açmak	Yes				Debut role
1993	Süper Baba		Yes			
1994	Gerilla		Yes			Co-director
1996	Gurbetçiler		Yes			
1996	Kralın Hayatı		Yes			
1998	Sıcak Saatler		Yes			
1999	Deli Yürek		Yes			
2002	Ekmek Teknesi		Yes			
2003	Kasabanın İncisi		Yes			
2004	Aynalar		Yes			
2005	Rüzgarlı Bahçe		Yes			
2006	İki Aile		Yes			
2007–2008	Pars Narkoterör		Yes			
2009	Yalancısın Sen				Yes	General coordinator
2011	Evvel Zaman Hikayesi		Yes			
2014–2019	Diriliş: Ertuğrul		Yes			
2015	Yunus Emre: Aşkın Yolculuğu		Yes			
2019–	Kuruluş: Osman		Yes			
2021–	Mendirman Jaloliddin		Yes			
2022	Destan					

== Awards and nominations ==
Year	Award	Category	Project	Result	Ref.
2016	Golden Butterfly Awards	Best Director of the Year	Diriliş: Ertuğrul	Nominated	
2016	Golden Palm Awards	TV series Director of the Year	Diriliş: Ertuğrul	Won	
2017	Golden Palm Awards	TV series Director of the Year	Diriliş: Ertuğrul	Won	
2017	Turkey Youth Awards	Best Director	Diriliş: Ertuğrul	Nominated	
