= Özge Törer =

Turkish actress (born 1999)

- Born: 16 August 1999 (age 27); İzmir, Turkey
- Education: Muğla Sıtkı Koçman University
- Occupation: Actress
- Years active: 2019–present

Özge Törer (born 16 August 1999) is a Turkish actress best known for her role as Bala Hatun in the Turkish TV series Kuruluş Osman, in which she starred alongside Burak Özçivit.

== Biography ==
Özge Törer was born in 1999 in İzmir, Turkey. She lived in Silivri, Turkey, until she finished high school, upon after she went to Muğla Sıtkı Koçman University and graduated with a degree in Performing Arts from the Faculty of Fine Arts. There, she won an award for her role in a stage show. Özge Törer made her on screen debut with Kuruluş Osman where she gained widespread recognition and critical acclaim for her role as Bala Hatun.

== Filmography ==
=== Television ===
Year	Title	Role	Notes	Platform
2019-2025	Kuruluş: Osman	Bala Hatun	Leading role	ATV
Coming soon	Karakuyu	Ferda Ateşer	Leading role	Kanal D

=== Digital ===
Year	Title	Role	Notes	Platform
Coming soon	Eve Giden Yol	Yasemin	Main role	Netflix

== Awards and nominations ==
Year	Awards	Category	Work	Result	Ref
2020	Crystal Globe Awards	Best Actress of the Year	Kuruluş: Osman	Won	
2020	Turkey Youth Awards	Best TV Actress	Kuruluş: Osman	Nominated	
2021	7th Golden 61 Awards (7. Altın 61 Ödülleri)	Best TV Couple (Osman Bey & Bala Hatun)	Kuruluş: Osman	Nominated	
2021	Eurasian Consumer Protection Association Award	Best Actress of the Year	Kuruluş: Osman	Won	
2024	Ayaklı Gazete Awards	Rising Star of the Year	Kuruluş: Osman	Won	
2024	Istanbul University - Cerrahpaşa Theater Group Award Ceremony	Best Actress in a TV Series	Kuruluş: Osman	Won	
2025	5th International Diamond Awards	TV Actress of the Year	Kuruluş: Osman	Won	
2025	11th Golden 61 Awards (11. Altın 61 Ödülleri)	Best Actress of the Year	Kuruluş: Osman	Won	
