= Muğla Sıtkı Koçman University =

Public university in Muğla, Turkey

- Muğla Sıtkı Koçman Üniversitesi
- Motto: "Fresh, Productive, Qualified"
- Type: State university
- Established: 1975 (Muğla School of Management); 1992 (Muğla University); 2012 (Muğla Sıtkı Koçman University)
- Rector: Prof. Dr. Turhan Kaçar
- Location: Merkez, Muğla, Turkey
- Founder: Sıtkı Koçman
- Website: https://www.mu.edu.tr/

Muğla Sıtkı Koçman University was established in 1992 as a state university with four proposed faculties: the Faculty of Arts & Sciences and Humanities, the Faculty of Economics and Administrative Sciences, the Faculty of Technical Education and the Faculty of Fisheries. Mugla School of Management, founded in 1975, originally affiliated with the Ankara Academy of Economics and Administrative Sciences, was the first higher education institution in Muğla. It then became the first faculty of Muğla Sıtkı Koçman University upon its establishment. Muğla Vocational School, founded in 1989 as part of Dokuz Eylül University in İzmir, joined Muğla University.

Over the past 20 years, the university has grown to include 18 faculties, 4 graduate schools, 5 schools, 13 vocational schools, and 35 research and application centres. Today, Muğla Sıtkı Koçman University encompasses a two-million square metre campus surrounded by a spectacular mountain view and smaller university sites and schools across the province. Currently, the university services over 41,805 students and employs over 1,300 full-time academic staff.
