= Imber (disambiguation) =

Imber is a depopulated village in Wiltshire, England.

Imber may also refer to:

- Imber (surname)
- IMBER, an international project on ocean biogeochemical cycles and ecosystems
- Imber tropicus, a moth of the family Sphingidae
