= Isner =

Isner is a surname. Notable people with the surname include:

- John Isner (born 1985), American tennis player
- Phil Isner, American politician

== See also ==
- Inger (surname)
- Isser (name)
- Imber (surname)
- Inzer (surname)
