= Rise of the Ottoman Empire =

Ottoman state before 1453

The rise of the Ottoman Empire started with the emergence of the Ottoman principality (Ottoman Turkish: Osmanlı Beyliği) in c. 1299 and ended c. 1453. This period witnessed the foundation of a political entity ruled by the Oghuz Turkic Kayi tribe's Ottoman Dynasty in the northwestern Anatolian region of Bithynia and its transformation from a small principality on the Byzantine frontier into an empire spanning the Balkans, Caucasus, Anatolia, Middle East and North Africa. For this reason, this period in the empire's history has been described as the "Proto-Imperial Era". Throughout most of this period, the Ottomans were merely one of many competing states in the region and relied upon the support of local warlords (Ghazis) and vassals (Beys) to maintain control over their realm. By the middle of the fifteenth century the Ottoman sultans were able to accumulate enough personal power and authority to establish a centralized imperial state, a process which was achieved by Sultan Mehmed II (r. 1451–1481). The Fall of Constantinople in 1453 is seen as the symbolic moment when the emerging Ottoman state shifted from a mere principality into an empire, thereby marking a major turning point in its history.

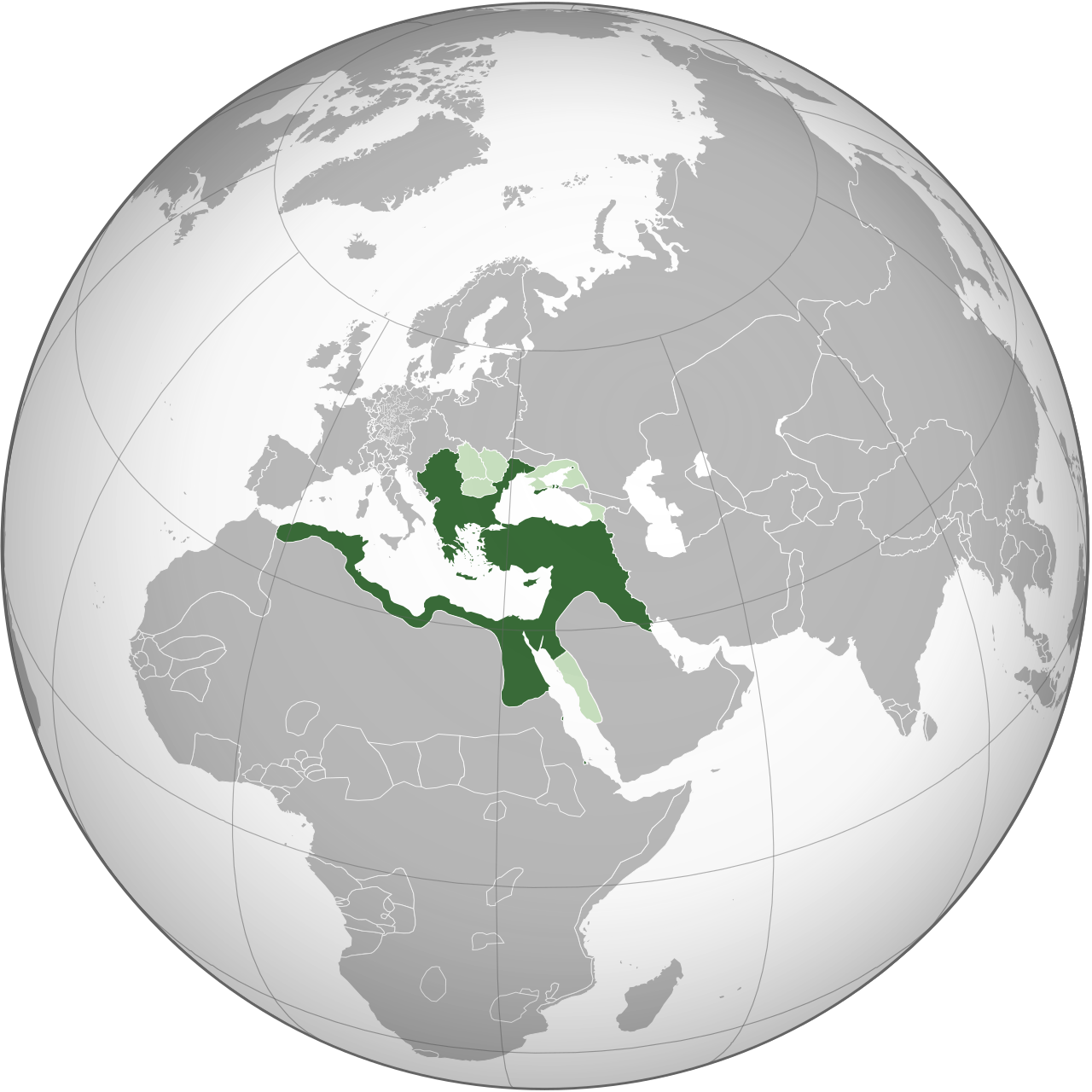
Ottoman Beylik (later Ottoman Empire) at its peak in 1683

The causes of Ottoman success cannot be attributed to any single factor, and they varied throughout the period as the Ottomans continually adapted to changing circumstances.

The earlier part of this period, the fourteenth century, is particularly difficult for historians to study due to the scarcity of sources. Not a single written document survives from the reign of Osman I, and very little survives from the rest of the century. The Ottomans, furthermore, did not begin to record their own history until the fifteenth century, more than a hundred years after many of the events they describe. It is thus a great challenge for historians to differentiate between fact and myth in analyzing the stories contained in these later chronicles, so much so that one historian has even declared it impossible, describing the earliest period of Ottoman history as a "black hole".

Turkish historian Halil İnalcık has emphasized the importance of religious zeal—expressed through jihad—as a primary motivation for the conquests of the Ottomans: "The ideal of gaza, holy war, was an important factor in the foundation and development of the Ottoman state. Society in the frontier principalities conformed to a particular cultural pattern imbued with the ideal of continuous Holy War and continuous expansion of the Dar ul Islam—the realms of Islam—until they covered the whole world." This is known as the Gaza Thesis, a now largely discredited theory of early Ottoman expansion.

== Anatolia before the Ottomans ==
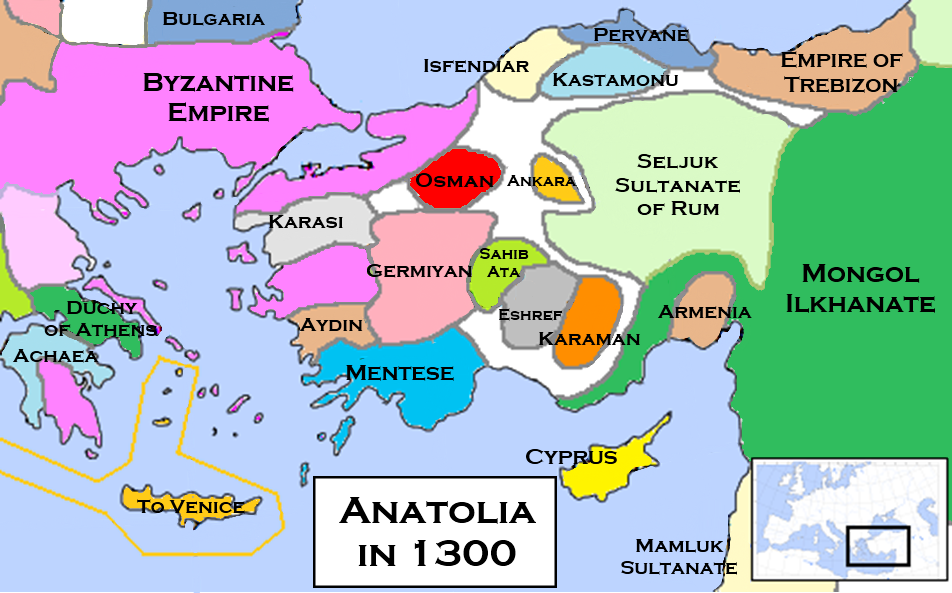
A rough map of Anatolian beyliks in c. 1300

After the Battle of Manzikert (1071) Anatolia was divided between two relatively powerful states: the Byzantine Empire in the west and the Anatolian Seljuks in the central plateau. Equilibrium between them was disrupted by the Mongol invasion and conquest of the Seljuks following the Battle of Köse Dağ in 1243, and the reconquest of Constantinople by the Byzantine Palaiologos dynasty in 1261, which shifted Byzantine attention away from the Anatolian frontier. Mongol pressure pushed nomadic Turkish tribes to migrate westward, into the now poorly-defended Byzantine territory. For the next two centuries, Anatolian Beyliks were under the suzerainty of the Mongols, especially the Ilkhanate. All coins minted during this period in Anatolia show Ilkhanate rulers. From the 1260s onward Anatolia increasingly began to slip from Byzantine control, as Turkish Anatolian beyliks were established both in formerly Byzantine lands and in the territory of the fragmenting Seljuk Sultanate.

Political authority in western Anatolia was thus extremely fragmented by the end of the thirteenth century, split between locally established rulers, tribal groups, holy figures, and warlords, with Byzantine and Seljuk authority ever present but rapidly weakening. The fragmentation of authority has led several historians to describe the political entities of thirteenth and fourteenth-century Anatolia as Taifas, or "petty kings", a comparison with the history of late-medieval Muslim Spain. The power of these groups was largely dependent upon their ability to attract military manpower. Western Anatolia was then a hotbed of raiding activity, with warriors switching allegiance at will to whichever chief seemed most able to provide them with opportunities for plunder and glory.

== Origin of the Ottoman state ==
The Ottoman dynasty is named after the first ruler of the Ottoman polity, Osman I. According to later Ottoman tradition, he was descended from a Turkic tribe which migrated out of Central Asia in the wake of the Mongol Conquests. As evidenced by coins minted during his reign, Osman's father was named Ertuğrul, but beyond this the details "are too mythological to be taken for granted."

The origin of the Ottoman dynasty isn't known for sure but it is known that it was established by Turks from Central Asia, who migrated to Anatolia and were under Mongol suzerainty.

Likewise, nothing is known about how Osman first established his principality (beylik) as the sources, none of them contemporary, provide many different and conflicting origin stories. What is certain is that at some point in the late thirteenth century Osman emerged as the leader of a small principality centered on the town of Söğüt in the north-western Anatolian region of Bithynia. The emergence of Osman as a leader is marked by him issuing coins in his name, unlike his predecessors in the last two centuries who issued coins in the name of the Illkhanates. Osman's principality was initially supported by the tribal manpower of nomadic Turkish groups, whom he led in raids against the Byzantine territories of the region. This Ottoman tribe was based not on blood-ties, but on political expedience. Thus it was inclusive of all who wished to join, including people of Byzantine origin. The Ottoman enterprise came to be led by several great warrior families, including the family of Köse Mihal, which had a Greek Christian origin and the family of Hranislav, which was Bulgarian. Islam and Persian culture were part of Ottoman self-identity from the start, as evidenced by a land grant issued by Osman's son Orhan in 1324, describing him as "Champion of the Faith".

=== Gaza and gazis in early Ottoman history ===
In 1938 the Austrian historian Paul Wittek published an influential work entitled The Rise of the Ottoman Empire, in which he put forth the argument that the early Ottoman state was constructed upon an ideology of Islamic holy war against non-Muslims. Such a war was known as gaza, and a warrior fighting in it was called a gazi. Wittek's formulation, subsequently known as the "Gaza Thesis," was influential for much of the twentieth century, and led historians to portray the early Ottomans as zealous religious warriors dedicated to the spread of Islam. Beginning in the 1980s, historians increasingly criticized Wittek's thesis. Scholars now recognize that the terms gaza and gazi did not have strictly religious connotations for the early Ottomans, and were often used in a secular sense to simply refer to raids. Additionally, the early Ottomans were neither strict orthodox Muslims nor were they unwilling to cooperate with non-Muslims, and several of the companions of the first Ottoman rulers were either non-Muslims or recent converts. The idea of holy war existed during the fourteenth century, but it was only one of many factors influencing Ottoman behavior. It was only later, in the fifteenth century, that Ottoman writers retroactively began to portray the early Ottomans as zealous Islamic warriors, in order to provide a noble origin for their dynasty which, by then, had constructed an intercontinental Islamic empire.

== Demography ==
Anatolia and the Balkans were greatly impacted by the arrival of the Black Death after 1347. Urban centers and settled regions were devastated, while nomadic groups suffered less of an impact. The first Ottoman incursions into the Balkans began shortly thereafter. Depopulation resulting from the plague was thus almost certainly a major factor in the success of early Ottoman expansion into the Balkans, and contributed to the weakening of the Byzantine Empire and the depopulation of Constantinople.

== Government ==
During this early period, before the Ottomans were able to establish a centralized system of government in the middle of the fifteenth century, the rulers' powers were "far more circumscribed, and depended heavily upon coalitions of support and alliances reached" among various power-holders within the empire, including Turkic tribal leaders and Balkan allies and vassals.

When the Ottoman polity first emerged at the end of the thirteenth century under the leadership of Osman I, it had a tribal organization without a complex administrative apparatus. As Ottoman territory expanded, its rulers were faced with the challenge of administering an ever-larger population. Early on, the Ottomans adopted the Seljuks of Rum as models for administration and the Illkhanates as models for military warfare, and by 1324 were able to produce Persian-language bureaucratic documents in the Seljuk style.

The early Ottoman state's expansion was fueled by the military activity of frontier warriors (Turkish: gazi), of whom the Ottoman ruler was initially merely primus inter pares. Much of the state's centralization was carried out in opposition to these frontier warriors, who resented Ottoman efforts to control them. Ultimately, the Ottomans managed to harness gazi military power while increasingly subordinating them.

The early Ottomans were noteworthy for the low tax rates which they imposed on their subjects. This reflected both an ideological concern for the well-being of their subjects, and also a pragmatic need to earn the loyalty of newly conquered populations. In the fifteenth century, the Ottoman state became more centralized and the tax burden increased, prompting criticism from writers.

An important factor in Ottoman success was their ability to preserve the empire across generations. Other Turkic groups frequently divided their realms between the sons of a deceased ruler. The Ottomans consistently kept the empire united under a single heir.

=== State centralization ===
The process of centralization is closely connected with an influx of Muslim scholars from Central Anatolia, where a more urban and bureaucratic Turkish civilization had developed under the Seljuks of Rum. Particularly influential was the Çandarlı family, which supplied several Grand Viziers to the early Ottomans and influenced their institutional development. Some time after 1376, Kara Halil, the head of the Çandarlı family, encouraged Murad I to institute a tax of one-fifth on slaves taken in war, known as the pençik. This gave the Ottoman rulers a source of manpower from which they could construct a new personal army, known as the Janissaries (yeniçeri). Such measures frustrated the gazi, who sustained Ottoman military conquests, and created lasting tensions within the state. It was also during the reign of Murad I that the office of military judge (Kazasker) was created, indicating an increasing level of social stratification between the emerging military-administrative class (askeri) and the rest of society. Murad I also instituted the practice of appointing specific frontier warriors as "Lords of the Frontier" (uc begleri). Such power of appointment indicates that the Ottoman rulers were no longer merely primus inter pares. As a way of openly declaring this new status, Murad became the first Ottoman ruler to adopt the title of sultan.

Beginning in the 1430s, but most likely earlier, the Ottomans conducted regular cadastral surveys of the territory under their rule, producing record-books known as tahrir defters. These surveys enabled the Ottoman state to organize the distribution of agricultural taxation rights to the military class of timariots, cavalrymen who collected revenue from the land in exchange for serving in the Ottoman army. Timariots came from diverse backgrounds. Some achieved their position as a reward for military service, while others were descended from the Byzantine aristocracy and simply continued to collect revenue from their old lands, now serving in the Ottoman army as well. Of the latter, many were converts to Islam, while others remained Christian.

Of great symbolic importance for Ottoman centralization was the practice of Ottoman rulers to stand upon hearing martial music, indicating their willingness to participate in gaza. Shortly after the Conquest of Constantinople in 1453, Mehmed II discontinued this practice, indicating that the Ottoman ruler was no longer a simple frontier warrior, but the sovereign of an empire. The empire's capital shifted from Edirne, the city symbolically connected with the frontier warrior ethos of gaza, to Constantinople, a city with deeply imperial connotations due to its long history as the capital of the Byzantine Empire. This was seen, both symbolically and practically, as the moment of the empire's definitive shift from a frontier principality into an empire.

== Military ==
Osman's army at the beginning of the fourteenth century consisted largely of mounted warriors. These he used in raids, ambushes, and hit-and-run attacks, allowing him to control the countryside of Bithynia. However, he initially lacked the means to conduct sieges. Bursa, the first major town conquered by the Ottomans, surrendered under threat of starvation following a long blockade rather than from an assault. It was under Orhan (r. 1323/4-1362) and Murad I (r. 1362-1389) that the Ottomans mastered the techniques of siege warfare.

The warriors in Osman's service came from diverse backgrounds. Known variously as gazis (Note: A term normally meaning "a warrior who fights in the name of Islam", but which had a variety of different meanings for the early Ottomans, not all of them strictly religious. On this see the above section, "Gaza and gazis in early Ottoman history".) and akıncıs (raiders), they were attracted to his success and joined out of a desire to win plunder and glory. Most of Osman's early followers were Muslim Turks of tribal origin, while others were of Byzantine origin, either Christians or recent converts to Islam.

The Ottomans began employing gunpowder weapons in the 1380s at the latest. By the 1420s they were regularly using cannons in siege warfare. Cannons were also used for fortress defense, and shore batteries allowed the Ottomans to bypass a Crusader blockade of the Dardanelles in 1444. By that time, handheld firearms had also come into use, and were adopted by some of the janissaries.

== Cultural and intellectual life ==
By the early fifteenth century, the Ottoman court was actively fostering literary output, much of it borrowing from the longstanding literary tradition of other Islamic courts further east. The first extant account of Ottoman history ever written was produced by the poet Ahmedi, originally meant to be presented to Sultan Bayezid I but, following the latter's death in 1402, written for his son Süleyman Çelebi instead. This work, entitled the İskendernāme, ("The Book of Alexander") was part of a genre known as "mirror for princes" (naṣīḥatnāme), meant to provide advice and guidance to the ruler with regard to statecraft. Thus rather than providing a factual account of the dynasty's history, Ahmedi's goal was to indirectly criticize the sultan by depicting his ancestors as model rulers, in contrast to the perceived deviance of Bayezid. Specifically, Ahmedi took issue with Bayezid's military campaigns against fellow Muslims in Anatolia, and thus depicted his ancestors as totally devoted to holy war against the Christian states of the Balkans.

== Political history ==
=== Osman I (c. 1299–1323/24) ===
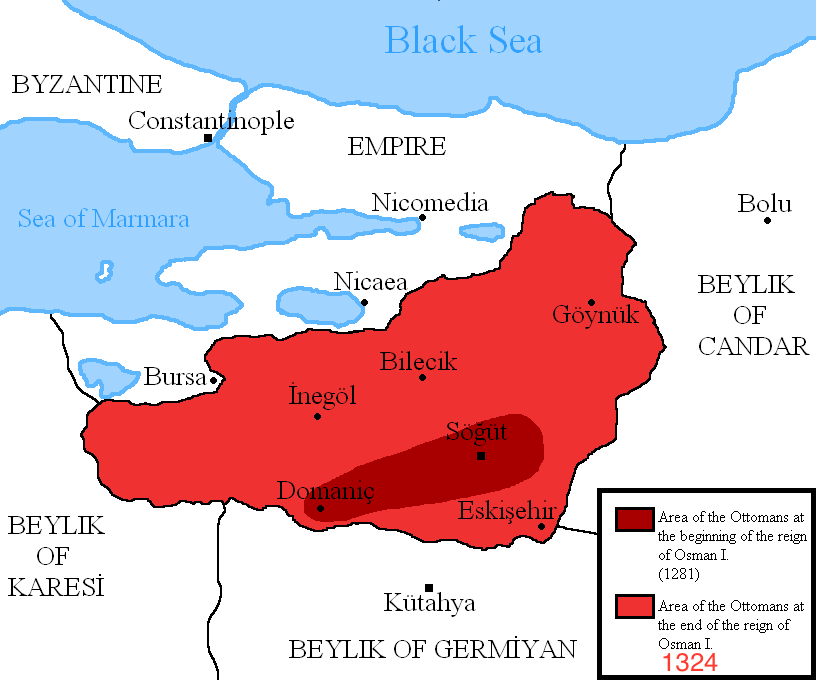
An estimation of the territory under the control of Osman.

Osman's origins are extremely obscure, and almost nothing is known about his career before the beginning of the fourteenth century. The date of 1299 is frequently given as the beginning of his reign; however, this date does not correspond with any historical event, and is purely symbolic. By 1300 he had become the leader of a group of Turkish pastoral tribes, through which he ruled over a small territory around the town of Söğüt in the north-western Anatolian region of Bithynia. He led frequent raids against the neighboring Byzantine Empire. Success attracted warriors to his following, particularly after his victory over a Byzantine army in the Battle of Bapheus in 1301 or 1302. Osman's military activity was largely limited to raiding because, by the time of his death in 1323–24, the Ottomans had not yet developed effective techniques for siege warfare. Although he is famous for his raids against the Byzantines, Osman also had many military confrontations with Tatar groups and with the neighboring principality of Germiyan.

Osman was adept at forging political and commercial relationships with nearby groups, Muslim as well as Christian. Early on, he attracted several notable figures to his side, including Köse Mihal, a Byzantine village headman whose descendants (known as the Mihaloğulları) enjoyed primacy among the frontier warriors in Ottoman service. Köse Mihal was noteworthy for having been a Christian Greek; while he eventually converted to Islam, his prominent historical role indicates Osman's willingness to cooperate with non-Muslims and to incorporate them in his political enterprise.

Osman I strengthened his legitimacy by marrying the daughter of Sheikh Edebali, a prominent local religious leader who was said to have been at the head of a community of dervishes on the frontier. Later Ottoman writers embellished this event by depicting Osman as having experienced a dream while staying with Edebali, in which it was foretold that his descendants would rule over a vast empire.

=== Orhan (1323/24–1362) ===
Upon Osman's death his son Orhan succeeded him as leader of the Ottomans. Orhan oversaw the conquest of Bithynia's major towns, as Bursa (Prusa) was conquered in 1326 and the rest of the region's towns fell shortly thereafter. Already by 1324, the Ottomans were making use of Seljuk bureaucratic practices, and had developed the capacity to mint coins and utilize siege tactics. It was under Orhan that the Ottomans began to attract Islamic scholars from the east to act as administrators and judges, and the first medrese (university) was established in Iznik in 1331.

In addition to fighting the Byzantines, Orhan also conquered the Turkish principality of Karesi in 1345–46, thus placing all potential crossing points to Europe in Ottoman hands. The experienced Karesi warriors were incorporated into the Ottoman military, and were a valuable asset in subsequent campaigns into the Balkans.

Orhan married Theodora, the daughter of Byzantine prince John VI Cantacuzenus. In 1346 Orhan openly supported John VI in the overthrowing of the emperor John V Palaeologus. When John VI became co-emperor (1347–1354) he allowed Orhan to raid the peninsula of Gallipoli in 1352, after which the Ottomans gained their first permanent stronghold across the Dardanelles at Çimpe Castle in 1354. Orhan decided to pursue war against Europe; Anatolian Turks were settled in and around Gallipoli to secure it as a springboard for military operations in Thrace against the Byzantines and Bulgarians. Most of eastern Thrace was overrun by Ottoman forces within a decade and was permanently brought under Orhan's control by means of heavy colonization. The initial Thracian conquests placed the Ottomans strategically astride all of the major overland communication routes linking Constantinople to the Balkan frontiers, facilitating their expanded military operations. ln addition, control of the highways in Thrace isolated Byzantium from direct overland contact with any of its potential allies in the Balkans and in Western Europe. Byzantine Emperor John V was forced to sign an unfavorable treaty with Orhan in 1356 that recognized his Thracian losses. For the next 50 years, the Ottomans went on to conquer vast territories in the Balkans, reaching as far north as modern-day Serbia.

In taking control over the passageways to Europe, the Ottomans gained a significant advantage over their rival Turkish principalities in Anatolia, as they now could gain immense prestige and wealth from conquests carried out on the Balkan frontier.

=== Murad I (1362–1389) ===
Soon after Orhan's death in 1362, Murad I became Sultan.

==== Edirne, 1362 ====
Murad's first major offensive was the conquest of the Byzantine city of Adrianople in 1362. He renamed it to Edirne and made it his new capital in 1363. By transferring his capital from Bursa in Anatolia to that newly won city in Thrace, Murad signaled his intentions to continue Ottoman expansion in Southeast Europe. Before the conquest of Edirne, most Christian Europeans regarded the Ottoman presence in Thrace as merely the latest unpleasant episode in a long string of chaotic events in the Balkans. After Murad I designated Edirne as his capital, they realized that the Ottomans intended to remain in Europe.

The Balkan states of Byzantium, Bulgaria, and Serbia were frightened by Ottoman conquests in Thrace, and were ill-prepared to deal with the threat. Byzantine territory was reduced and fragmented. It consisted mostly of the capital, Constantinople and its Thracian environs, the city of Thessaloniki and its immediate surroundings, and the Despotate of the Morea in the Peloponnese. Contact between Constantinople and the two other regions was only feasible via a tenuous sea route through the Dardanelles, kept open by the Italian maritime powers of Venice and Genoa. The weakened Byzantine Empire no longer possessed the resources to defeat Murad on its own. Concerted action on the part of the Byzantines, often divided by civil war, was impossible. The survival of Constantinople itself depended on its legendary defensive walls, the lack of an Ottoman navy, and the willingness of Murad to honor provisions in the 1356 treaty, which permitted the city to be provisioned.

Bulgaria under Tsar Ivan Aleksandar was expanding and prosperous. However, at the end of his rule, Alexsandar made the fatal mistake to divide the Second Bulgarian Empire into three appanages held by his sons. Bulgaria's cohesion was shattered further in the 1350s by a rivalry between the holder of Vidin, Ivan Sratsimir, Ivan Aleksandar's sole surviving son by his first wife, and Ivan Shishman, the product of Aleksandar's second marriage and the tsar's designated successor. In addition to internal problems, Bulgaria was further crippled by a Hungarian attack. In 1365 Hungarian King Louis I invaded and seized Vidin province, whose ruler Ivan Sratsimir was taken captive. Despite the concurrent loss of most Bulgarian Thracian holdings to Murad, Ivan Aleksandar became fixated on the Hungarians in Vidin. He formed a coalition against them with the Bulgarian ruler of Dobrudja Dobrotitsa and Voievod Vladislav I Vlaicu of Wallachia. Although the Hungarians were repulsed and Ivan Sratsimir restored to his throne, Bulgaria emerged more intensely divided. Ivan Sratsimir proclaimed himself tsar of an "Empire" of Vidin in 1370, and Dobrotitsa received de facto recognition as independent despot in Dobrudzha. Bulgaria's efforts were squandered to little domestic purpose and against the wrong enemy.

Given Serbia's preeminence in the Balkans under Tsar Stefan Dušan, its rapid dissolution following his death in 1355 was dramatic. The powerful regional Serb nobles demonstrated little respect for his successor, Stefan Uroš V. Young, weak Uroš was incapable of ruling as his father had. The separatist-minded bojars were quick to take advantage of the situation, and Serbia fragmented.

First to throw off Serbian control were the Greek provinces of Thessaly and Epiros as well as Dušan's former Albanian holdings. A series of small independent principalities arose in western and southern Macedonia, while the Hungarians encroached deeper into Serb lands in the north. Uroš held only the core Serbian lands, whose nobles, although more powerful than their prince, generally remained loyal. These core lands consisted of: the western lands, including Montenegro (Zeta); the southern lands, held by Jovan Uglješa in Serres, encompassing all of eastern Macedonia; and the central Serbian lands, stretching from the Danube south into central Macedonia, co-ruled by Uroš and the powerful noble Vukasin Mrnjavcevic, who held Prilep in Macedonia. Far from preserving Serb unity, Uroš's loosely amalgamated domains were wracked by constant civil war among the regional nobles, leaving Serbia vulnerable to the rising Ottoman threat. Murad I rose to the sultanate in 1362.

==== Gallipoli, 1366 ====
By 1370 Murad controlled most of Thrace, bringing him into direct contact with Bulgaria and the southeastern Serbian lands ruled by Uglješa. Uglješa, the most powerful Serb regional ruler, unsuccessfully attempted to forge an anti-Ottoman alliance of Balkan states in 1371. Byzantium, vulnerable to the Turks because of its food supply situation, refused to cooperate. Bulgaria, following Ivan Aleksandar's death early that year, lay officially divided into the "Empire" of Vidin, ruled by Stratsimir (1370–1396), and Aleksandar's direct successor Tsar Ivan Shishman (1371–1395), who ruled central Bulgaria from Turnovo. Young, his hold on the throne unsteady, threatened by Stratsimir, and probably pressured by the Turks, Shishman could not afford to participate in Uglješa's scheme. Of the regional Serb bojars, only Vukašin, protector of Uroš and Uglješa's brother, joined in the effort. The others either failed to recognize the Ottoman danger or refused to participate lest competitors attacked while they were in the field.

==== Maritsa, 1371 ====
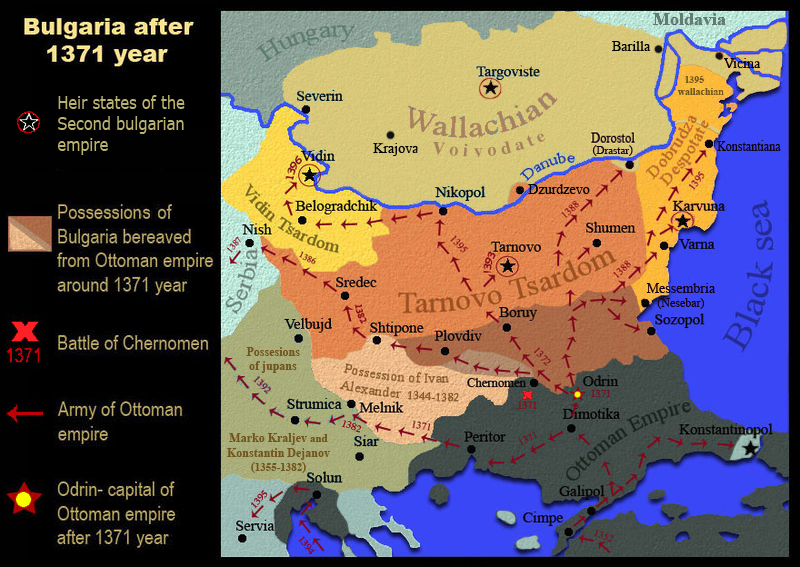
The Ottoman advance after the Battle of Maritsa

The Battle of Maritsa took place at the Maritsa River near the village of Chernomen on September 26, 1371, with sultan Murad's lieutenant Lala Shahin Pasha and the Serbs numbering some 70,000 men under the command of the Serbian king of Prilep Vukašin Mrnjavčević and his brother despot Uglješa. The latter wanted to make a surprise attack in the Ottoman capital city, Edirne, while Murad I was in Asia Minor. The Ottoman army was much smaller, but due to superior tactics (night raid on the allied camp), Şâhin Paşa defeated the Christian army and killed King Vukašin and despot Uglješa. Macedonia and parts of Greece fell under Ottoman power after this battle. Both Uglješa and Vukašin perished in the carnage. So overwhelming was the Ottoman victory that the Turks referred to the battle as the Rout (or Destruction) of the Serbs.

What little unity Serbia possessed collapsed after the catastrophe at Ormenion (Chernomen). Uroš died before the year was out, ending the Nemanjić dynasty, and large areas of central Serbia broke away as independent principalities, reducing it to half of its former size. No future ruler ever again officially held the office of car, and no single bojar enjoyed enough power or respect to gain recognition as a unifying leader. Vukasin's son, Marko, survived the slaughter and proclaimed himself Serbian "king" (kralj) but was unable to enforce his claim beyond his lands around Prilep, in central Macedonia. Serbia slipped into accelerated fragmentation and internecine warfare among the proliferating regional princes.

In the aftermath of the battle at Chernomen, Ottoman raids into Serbia and Bulgaria intensified. The enormity of the victory and the incessant raids into his lands convinced Turnovo Bulgarian Tsar Shishman of the necessity for coming to terms with the Ottomans. By 1376 at the latest, Shishman accepted vassal status under Murad and sent his sister as the sultan's "wife" to the harem at Edirne. The arrangement did not prevent Ottoman raiders from continuing to plunder inside Shishman's borders. As for Byzantium, Emperor John V definitively accepted Ottoman vassalage soon after the battle, opening the door to Murad's direct interference in Byzantine domestic politics.

The Bulgarians and Serbs enjoyed a brief respite during the 1370s and into the 1380s when matters in Anatolia and increased meddling in Byzantium's political affairs kept Murad preoccupied. In Serbia, the lull permitted the northern Serb bojar Prince Lazar Hrebeljanovic (1371–1389), with the support of powerful Bulgarian and Montenegrin nobles and the backing of the Serbian Orthodox Patriarchate of Pec, to consolidate control over much of the core Serbian lands. Most of the Serb regional rulers in Macedonia, including Marko, accepted vassalage under Murad to preserve their positions, and many of them led Serb forces in the sultan's army operating in Anatolia against his Turkish rivals.

==== Dubravnica, 1381 ====
By the mid-1380s Murad's attention once again focused on the Balkans. With his Bulgarian vassal Shishman preoccupied by a war with Wallachian Voievod Dan I of Wallachia (c. 1383–1386), in 1385 Murad took Sofia, the last remaining Bulgarian possession south of the Balkan Mountains, opening the way toward strategically located Niš, the northern terminus of the important Vardar-Morava highway.

==== Saurian Field, 1385 ====
The Battle of Savra was fought on 18 September 1385 between Ottoman and Serbian forces. The Ottomans were victorious and most of the local Serbian and Albanian lords became vassals.

==== Plocnik, 1386 ====
Murad captured Niš in 1386, perhaps forcing Lazar of Serbia to accept Ottoman vassalage soon afterward. While he pushed deeper into the north—central Balkans, Murad also had forces moving west along the Via Ingatia into Macedonia, forcing vassal status on regional rulers who until that time had escaped that fate. One contingent reached the Albanian Adriatic coast in 1385. Another took and occupied Thessaloniki in 1387. The danger to the continued independence of the Balkan Christian states grew alarmingly apparent.

When Anatolian affairs forced Murad to leave the Balkans in 1387, his Serbian and Bulgarian vassals attempted to sever their ties to him. Lazar formed a coalition with Tvrtko I of Bosnia and Stratsimir of Vidin. After he refused an Ottoman demand that he live up to his vassal obligations, troops were dispatched against him. Lazar and Tvrtko met the Turks and defeated them at Plocnik, west of Niš. The victory by his fellow Christian princes encouraged Shishman to shed Ottoman vassalage and reassert Bulgarian independence.

==== Bileća, 1388 ====
Murad returned from Anatolia in 1388 and launched a lightning campaign against the Bulgarian rulers Shishman and Sratsimir, who swiftly were forced into vassal submission. He then demanded that Lazar proclaim his vassalage and pay tribute. Confident because of the victory at Plocnik, the Serbian prince refused and turned to Tvrtko of Bosnia and Vuk Brankovic, his son-in-law and independent ruler of northern Macedonia and Kosovo, for aid against the certain Ottoman retaliatory offensive.

==== Kosovo, 1389 ====
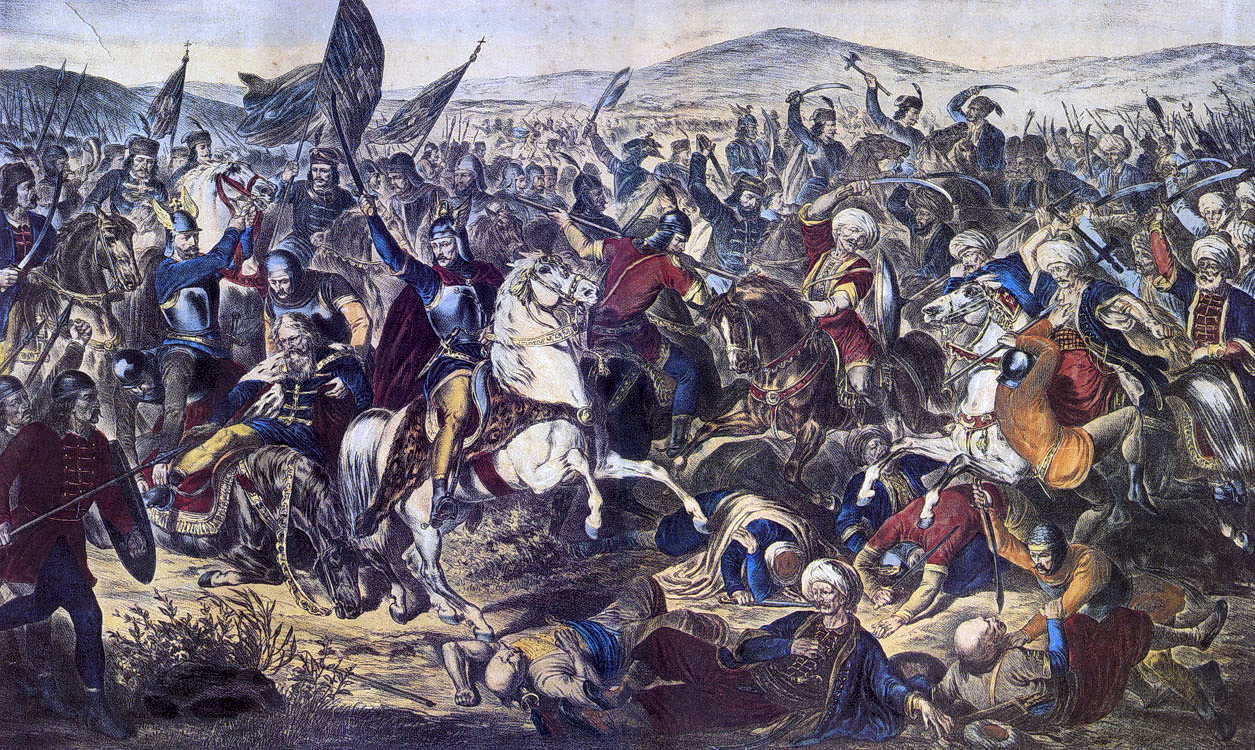
Battle on Kosovo, by Adam Stefanovic, 1870

On St. Vitus' Day, June 15, 1389, the Ottoman army, personally commanded by Sultan Murad, fought the Serbian army led by Serbian Prince Lazar Hrebeljanović, which also included contingents led by Vuk Branković, and a contingent sent from Bosnia by King Tvrtko I, commanded by Vlatko Vuković. Estimates of army sizes vary, with the Ottomans having greater numbers (27,000–40,000) than the Orthodox army (12,000–30,000). The battle resulted in a draw. Both armies were mostly wiped out. Both Lazar and Murad lost their lives. Although the Ottomans managed to annihilate the Serbian army, they also suffered high casualties which delayed their progress. The Serbs were left with too few men to effectively defend their lands, while the Turks had many more troops in the east. Consequently, one after the other, the Serbian principalities that were not already Ottoman vassals became so in the following years. The Battle of Kosovo is particularly important to modern Serbian history, tradition, and national identity. Lazar's young and weak successor Stefan Lazarević (1389–1427) concluded a vassal agreement with Bayezid in 1390 to counter Hungarian moves into northern Serbia, while Vuk Branković, the last independent Serb prince, held out until 1392.

=== Bayezid I (1389–1402) ===
Bayezid I succeeded to the sultanship upon the assassination of his father Murad. In a rage over the attack, he ordered all Serbian captives killed; Beyazid became known as Yıldırım, the lightning bolt, for the speed with which his empire expanded.

Bayezid lost little time in expanding Ottoman Balkan conquests. He followed up on his victory by raiding throughout Serbia and southern Albania, forcing most of the local princes into vassalage. Both to secure the southern stretch of the Vardar-Morava highway and to establish a firm base for permanent expansion westward to the Adriatic coast, Bayezid settled large numbers of yürüks along the Vardar River valley in Macedonia.

The appearance of Turk raiders at Hungary's southern borders awakened the Hungarian King Sigismund (1387–1437) to the danger that the Ottomans posed to his kingdom, and he sought out Balkan allies for a new anti-Ottoman coalition.

By early 1393 Turnovo Bulgaria's Ivan Shishman, hoping to throw off his onerous vassalage, was in secret negotiations with Sigismund, along with Wallachian Voievod Mircea the Old (1386–1418) and, possibly, Vidin's Ivan Sratsimir. Bayezid got wind of the talks and launched a devastating campaign against Shishman. Turnovo was captured after a lengthy siege, and Shishman fled to Nikopol. When that town fell to Bayezid, Shishman was captured and beheaded. All his lands were annexed by the sultan, and Sratsimir, whose Vidin holdings had escaped Bayezid's wrath, was forced to reaffirm his vassalage.

Having dealt harshly and effectively with his disloyal Bulgarian vassals, Bayezid then turned his attention south to Thessaly and the Morea, whose Greek lords had accepted Ottoman vassalage in the 1380s. Their incessant bickering among themselves, especially those of the Greek Morean magnates, required Bayezid's intervention. He summoned a meeting of all his Balkan vassals at Serres in 1394 to settle these and other outstanding matters. Among the sultan's attending vassals were the Thessalian and Morean nobles, Byzantine Emperor Manuel II Palaiologos (1391–1425), and Serbian Prince Lazarevic. At the meeting, Bayezid acquired possession of all disputed territories, and all of the attendees were required to reaffirm their vassal status.

When the Moreans later reneged on their Serres agreement with Bayezid, the angered Ottoman ruler blockaded the Morean despot's imperial brother Manuel II in Constantinople and then marched southward and annexed Thessaly. The Duchy of Athens accepted Ottoman overlordship when Turkish forces appeared on its border. Although a massive Ottoman punitive raid into the Peloponnese in 1395 netted much booty, events in the Balkans’ northeast saved Morea from further direct attack at the time.

While Bayezid was occupied in Greece, Mircea of Wallachia conducted a series of raids across the Danube into Ottoman territory. In retaliation, Bayezid's forces, which included Serb vassal troops led by Lazarevic and Kralj Marko, struck into Wallachia in 1395 but were defeated at Rovine, where Marko was killed. The victory saved Wallachia from Turkish occupation, but Mircea accepted vassalage under Bayezid to avert further Ottoman intervention. The sultan took consolation for his less than victorious efforts in annexing Dobrudzha and in supporting a pretender, Vlad I (1395–97), to the Wallachian throne. Two years of civil war ensued before Mircea regained complete control of the principality.

==== Nicopolis ====
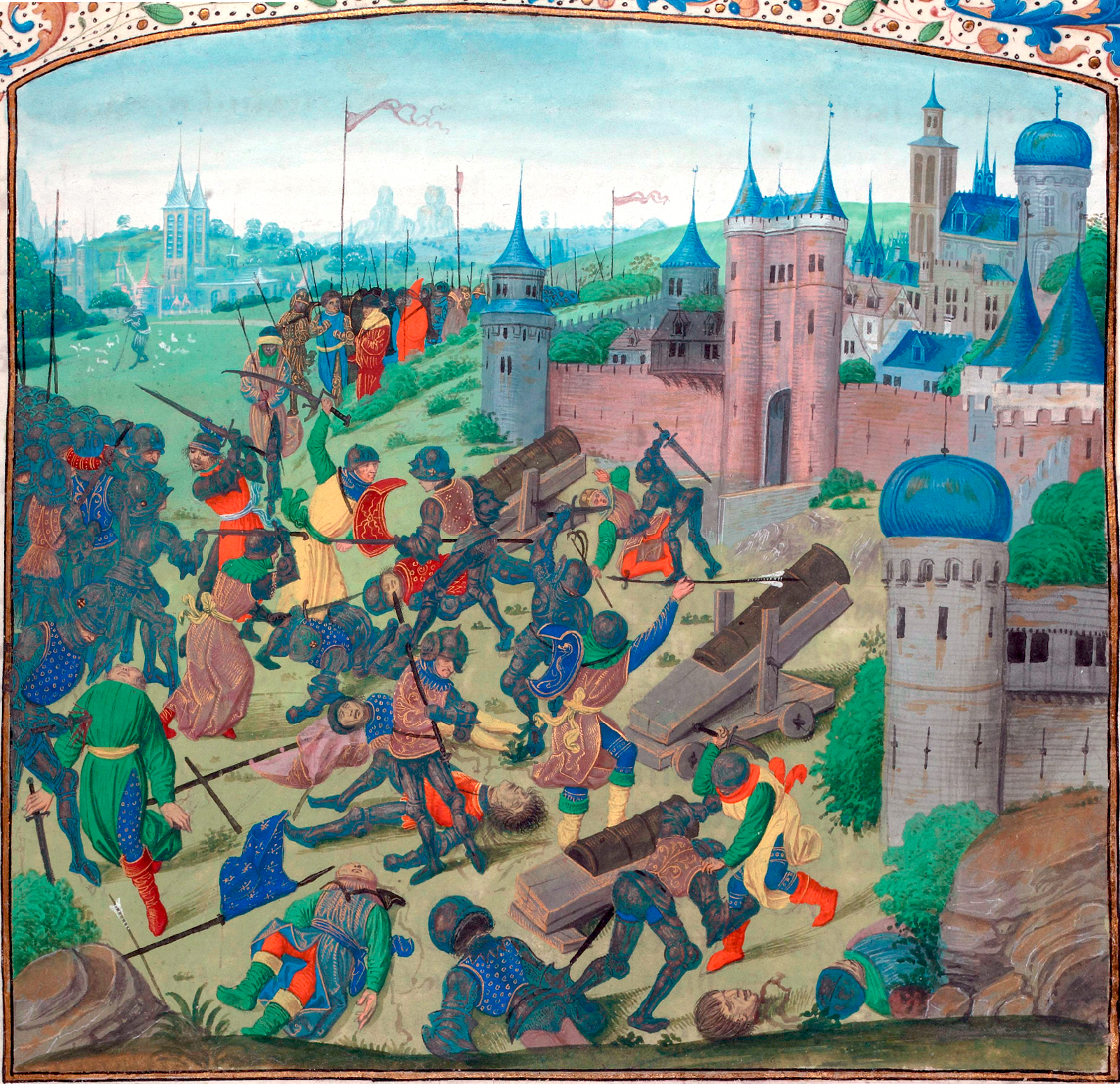
Battle of Nicopolis (1396)

In 1396 Hungarian King Sigismund finally pulled together a crusade against the Ottomans. The crusader army was composed primarily of Hungarian and French knights, but included some Wallachian troops. Though nominally led by Sigismund, it lacked command cohesion. The crusaders crossed the Danube, marched through Vidin, and arrived at Nikopol, where they met the Turks. The headstrong French knights refused to follow Sigismund's battle plans, resulting in their crushing defeat. Because Sratsimir had permitted the crusaders to pass through Vidin, Bayezid invaded his lands, took him prisoner, and annexed his territories. With Vidin's fall, Bulgaria ceased to exist, becoming the first major Balkan Christian state to disappear completely by direct Ottoman conquest.

Following Nikopol, Bayezid contented himself with raiding Hungary, Wallachia, and Bosnia. He conquered most of Albania and forced the remaining northern Albanian lords into vassalage. A new, halfhearted siege of Constantinople was undertaken but lifted in 1397 after Emperor Manuel II, Bayezid's vassal, agreed that the sultan should confirm all future Byzantine emperors. Soon thereafter Bayezid was called back to Anatolia to deal with continuing problems with the Ottomans' Turkish rivals and never returned to the Balkans.

==== Ankara, 1402 ====
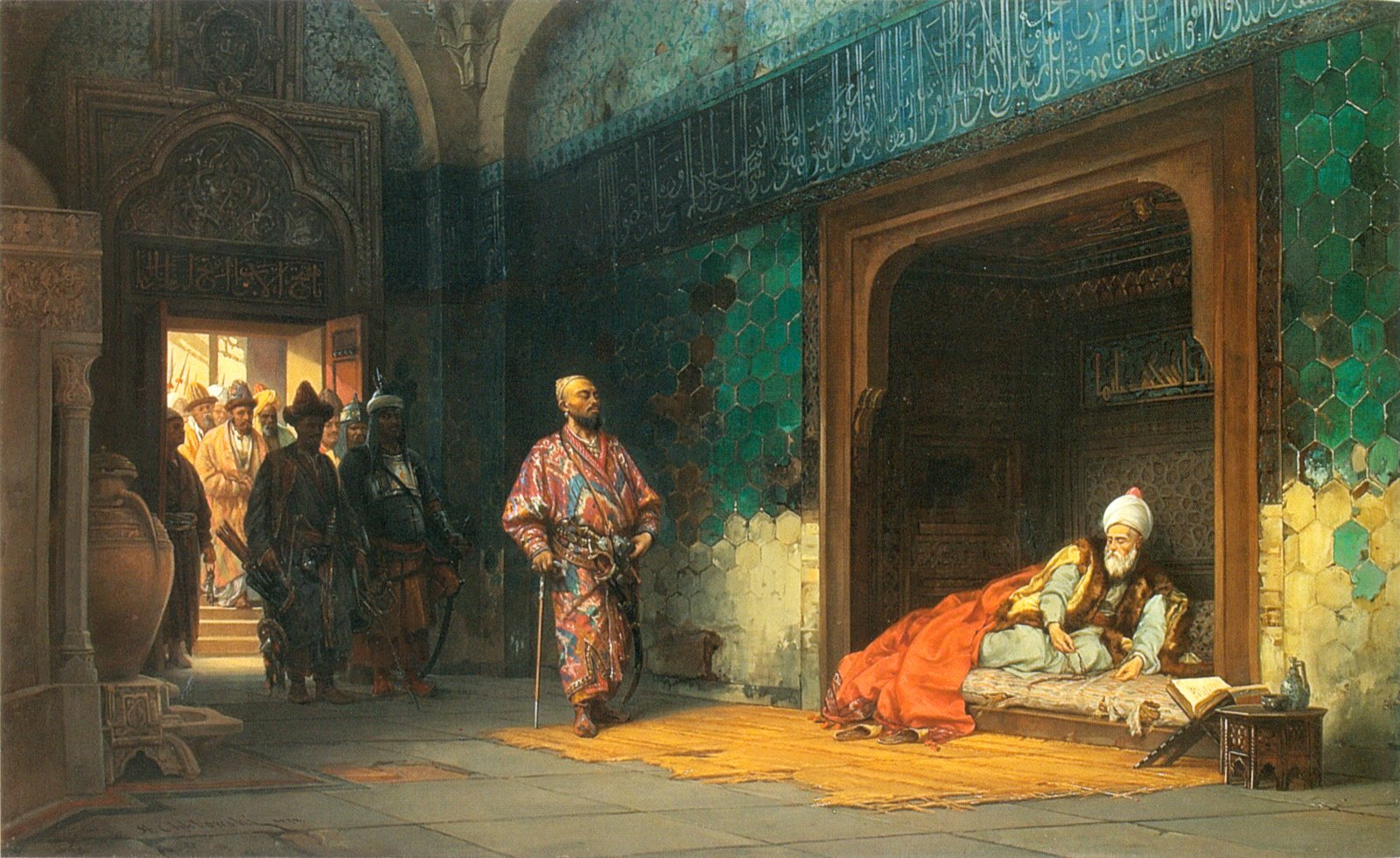
Painting by Stanisław Chlebowski, Sultan Bayezid prisoned by Timur, 1878, depicting the capture of Bayezid by Timur.

Bayezid took with him an army composed primarily of Balkan vassal troops, including Serbs led by Lazarevic. He soon faced an invasion of Anatolia by the Central Asian ruler Timur Lenk. Around 1400, Timur entered the Middle East. Timur Lenk pillaged a few villages in eastern Anatolia and commenced the conflict with the Ottoman Empire. In August, 1400, Timur and his horde burned the town of Sivas to the ground and advanced into the mainland. Their armies met outside of Ankara, at the Battle of Ankara, in 1402. The Ottomans were routed and Bayezid was taken prisoner, later dying in captivity. A civil war, lasting from 1402 to 1413, broke out among Bayezid's surviving sons. Known in Ottoman history as the Interregnum, that struggle temporarily halted active Ottoman expansion in the Balkans.

=== Ottoman Interregnum (1402–1413) ===
After the defeat at Ankara followed a time of total chaos in the Empire. Mongols roamed free in Anatolia and the political power of the sultan was broken. After Beyazid was captured, his remaining sons, Suleiman Çelebi, İsa Çelebi, Mehmed Çelebi, and Musa Çelebi fought each other in what became known as the Ottoman Interregnum.

The Ottoman Interregnum brought a brief period of semi-independence to the vassal Christian Balkan states. Suleyman, one of the late sultan's sons, held the Ottoman capital at Edirne and proclaimed himself ruler, but his brothers refused to recognize him. He then concluded alliances with Byzantium, to which Thessaloniki was returned, and with Venice in 1403 to bolster his position. Suleyman's imperious character, however, turned his Balkan vassals against him. In 1410 he was defeated and killed by his brother Musa, who won the Ottoman Balkans with the support of Byzantine Emperor Manuel II, Serbian Despot Stefan Lazarevic, Wallachian Voievod Mircea, and the two last Bulgarian rulers' sons. Musa then was confronted for sole control of the Ottoman throne by his younger brother Mehmed, who had freed himself of Timurid vassalage and held Ottoman Anatolia.

Concerned over the growing independence of his Balkan Christian vassals, Musa turned on them. Unfortunately, he alienated the Islamic bureaucratic and commercial classes in his Balkan lands by continually favoring the lower social elements to gain wide popular support. Alarmed, the Balkan Christian vassal rulers turned to Mehmed, as did the chief Ottoman military, religious, and commercial leaders. In 1412 Mehmed invaded the Balkans, took Sofia and Nis, and joined forces with Lazarevicys Serbs. In the following year, Mehmed decisively defeated Musa outside of Sofia. Musa was killed, and Mehmed I (1413–21) emerged as the sole ruler of a reunited Ottoman state.

=== Mehmed I (1413–1421) ===
When Mehmed Çelebi stood as victor in 1413 he crowned himself in Edirne (Adrianople) as Mehmed I. His was the duty to restore the Ottoman Empire to its former glory. The Empire had suffered hard from the interregnum; the Mongols were still at large in the east, even though Timur had died in 1405; many of the Christian kingdoms of the Balkans had broken free of Ottoman control; and the land, especially Anatolia, had suffered hard from the war.

Mehmed moved the capital from Bursa to Adrianople. He faced a delicate political situation in the Balkans. His Bulgarian, Serbian, Wallachian, and Byzantine vassals were virtually independent. The Albanian tribes were uniting into a single state, and Bosnia remained completely independent, as did Moldavia. Hungary retained territorial ambitions in the Balkans, and Venice held numerous Balkan coastal possessions. Prior to Bayezid's death, Ottoman control of the Balkans appeared a certainty. At the end of the interregnum, that certainty seemed open to question.

Mehmed generally resorted to diplomacy rather than militancy in dealing with the situation. While he did conduct raiding expeditions into neighboring European lands, which returned much of Albania to Ottoman control and forced Bosnian King-Ban Tvrtko II Kotromanić (1404–1409, 1421–1445), along with many Bosnian regional nobles, to accept formal Ottoman vassalage, Mehmed conducted only one actual war with the Europeans – a short and indecisive conflict with Venice.

The new sultan had grave domestic problems. Musa's former policies sparked discontent among the Ottoman Balkans’ lower classes. In 1416 a popular revolt of Muslims and Christians broke out in Dobruja, led by Musa's former confidant, the scholar-mystic Şeyh Bedreddin, and supported by Wallachian voivode Mircea I. Bedreddin preached such concepts as merging Islam, Christianity, and Judaism into a single faith and the social betterment of free peasants and nomads at the expense of the Ottoman bureaucratic and professional classes. Mehmed crushed the revolt and Bedreddin died. Mircea then occupied Dobruja, but Mehmed wrested the region back in 1419, capturing the Danubian fort of Giurgiu and forcing Wallachia back into vassalage.

Mehmed spent the rest of his reign reorganizing Ottoman state structures disrupted by the interregnum. When Mehmed died in 1421, one of his sons, Murad, became sultan.

=== Murad II (1421–1451) ===
Murad II spent his early years on the throne disposing of rivals and rebellions, most notably the revolts of the Serbs. He also had problems at home. He subdued the rebels of his uncle Mustafa Çelebi and brother Küçük Mustafa.

==== Constantinople, 1422 ====
In 1422, Murad II laid siege to Constantinople for several months and lifted it only after forcing the Byzantine emperor, Manuel II Palaiologos to pay additional tribute.

In 1422 the first regular war against Venice began with the Siege of Thessalonica (1422–1430). Byzantine involvement in the war ended with the transfer of the city to the Venetian Republic in 1423, which ended Murad's siege of Constantinople. Thessalonica continued to be under siege until 1430, with the Turkish sack of the city.

==== Thessalonika, 1430 ====
On the request of its inhabitants, Venetian troops took control of the city of Salonika (Thessaloniki). The Ottoman army that laid siege to the city knew nothing of the transfer of power, and a number of Venetian soldiers were killed by Ottoman troops, believing them to be Greeks. Murad II had been on peaceful terms with Venice, so the Venetians deemed the act unacceptable and declared full war.

Murad acted swiftly, besieging Constantinople and sending his armies to Salonika. The Venetians had gained reinforcements by sea but, when the Ottomans stormed the city, the outcome was forgone and the Venetians fled to their ships. But when the Turks entered and began plundering the city, the Venetian fleet started bombarding the city from the sea-side. The Ottomans fled and the fleet was able to hold off the Ottomans until new Venetian reinforcements arrived to recapture the city. The outcome of the Battle of Salonika was a setback for Murad. Serbia and Hungary allied themselves with Venice. Pope Martin V encouraged other Christian states to join the war against the Ottomans, though only Austria ever sent troops to the Balkans.

The war in the Balkans began as the Ottoman army moved to recapture Wallachia, which the Ottomans had lost to Mircea I of Wallachia during the Interregnum and that now was a Hungarian vassal state. As the Ottoman army entered Wallachia, the Serbs started attacking Bulgaria and, at the same time, urged by the Pope, the Anatolian emirate of Karamanid attacked the Empire from the back. Murad had to split his army. The main force went to defend Sofia and the reserves had to be called to Anatolia. The remaining troops in Wallachia were crushed by the Hungarian army that was now moving south into Bulgaria where the Serbian and Ottoman armies battled each other. The Serbs were defeated and the Ottomans turned to face the Hungarians who fled back into Wallachia when they realized they were unable to attack the Ottomans from the back. Murad fortified his borders against Serbia and Hungary but did not try to retake Wallachia. Instead, he sent his armies to Anatolia where they defeated Karaman in 1428.

In 1430 a large Ottoman fleet attacked Salonika by surprise. The Venetians signed a peace treaty in 1432. The treaty gave the Ottomans the city of Salonika and the surrounding land. The war by Serbia and Hungary against the Ottoman Empire had come to a standstill in 1441, when the Holy Roman Empire, Poland, Albania, and the Jandarid and Karamanid beyliks (in violation of the peace treaty) intervened against the Ottomans. Niš and Sofia fell to the Christians in 1443. In 1444, the Empire suffered a major defeat in the Battle of Jalowaz. On July 12, 1444, Murad signed a treaty which gave Wallachia and the Bulgarian province of Varna to Hungary and gave western Bulgaria (including Sofia) to Serbia. It forced Murad to abdicate in favor of his twelve-year-old son Mehmed. Later the same year the Christians violated the peace treaty and attacked anew.

==== Varna, 1444 ====
On November 10, 1444, Murad defeated the Polish–Hungarian army of Wladislaus III of Poland led by Janos Hunyadi at the Battle of Varna.

Murad was reinstated with the help of the Janissaries in 1446. Another peace treaty was signed in 1448 giving the Empire Wallachia and Bulgaria and a part of Albania. After the Balkan front was secured, Murad turned east and defeated Timur Lenk's son, Shah Rukh, and the emirates of Candar and Karaman in Anatolia.

==== Kosovo, 1448 ====
At 1448, John Hunyadi saw the right moment to lead a campaign against the Ottoman Empire. After the defeat of Varna, he raised another army to attack the Ottomans. His strategy was based on possible revolt of thr Balkan people and a surprise attack, together with destroying the main force of the Ottomans in a single battle. Hunyadi was totally immodest and led his forces without leaving any escort behind.

Murad died in the winter 1450–1451 in Edirne. Some have it that he was wounded in a battle against Skanderbeg's Albanian guerillas.

=== Mehmed II (1451–1481) ===
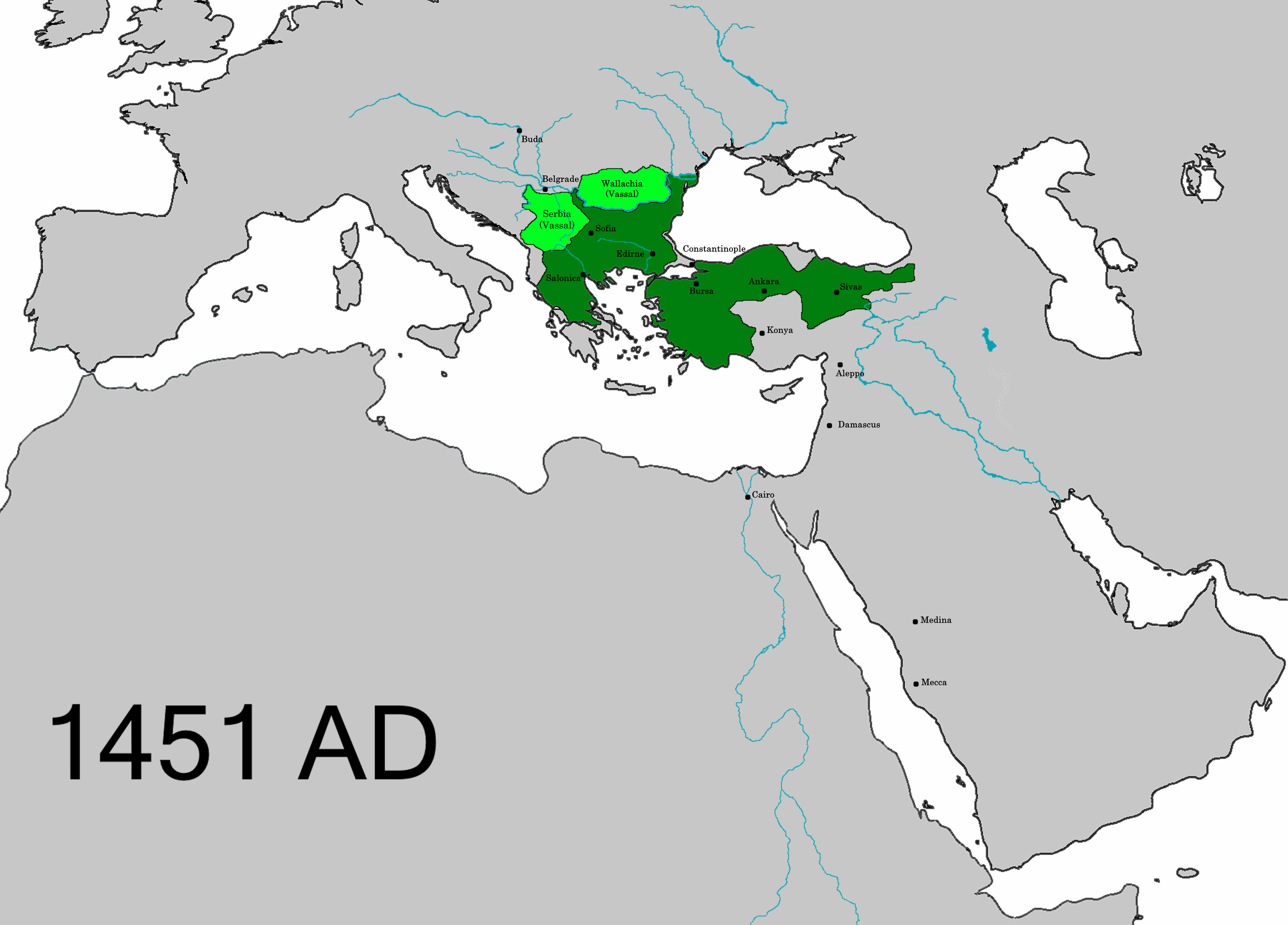
The Ottoman Empire at the beginning of the second reign of Mehmed II

Mehmed II (called Fatih, the Conqueror) came to the Ottoman throne following Murad's death in 1451. But by conquering and annexing the emirate of Karaman (May–June 1451) and by renewing the peace treaties with Venice (September 10) and Hungary (November 20), Mehmed II proved his skills both on the military and the political front and was soon accepted by the noble class of the Ottoman court.

He made capturing Constantinople his first priority, believing that it would solidify his power over the high military and administrative officials who had caused him such problems during his earlier reign. Good reasons underlay his decision. So long as Constantinople remained in Christian hands, his enemies could use it as either a potential base for splitting the empire at its center or as an excuse for the Christian West's continued military efforts. Constantinople's location also made it the natural "middleman" center for both land and sea trade between the eastern Mediterranean and central Asia, possession of which would ensure immense wealth. Just as important, Constantinople was a fabled imperial city, and its capture and possession would bestow untold prestige on its conqueror, who would be seen by Muslims as a hero and by Muslims and Christians alike as a great and powerful emperor.

Mehmed spent two years preparing for his attempt on the Byzantine capital. He built a navy to cut the city off from outside help by sea; he purchased an arsenal of large cannons from the Hungarian gunsmith Urban; he sealed the Bosphorus north of the city by erecting a powerful fortress on its European shore to prevent succor arriving from the Black Sea; and he meticulously concentrated in Thrace every available military unit in his lands. A trade agreement with Venice prevented the Venetians from intervening on behalf of the Byzantines, and the rest of Western Europe unwittingly cooperated with Mehmed's plans by being totally absorbed in internecine wars and political rivalries.

==== Constantinople, 1453 ====
When in 1451 the bankrupt Byzantines asked Mehmed to double the tribute for holding an Ottoman pretender for the throne, he used the request as a pretext for annulling all treaties with the Byzantine Empire. Nevertheless, when he proposed in 1452 to siege Constantinople most of the divan, and especially the Grand Vizier, Çandarlı Halil Pasha, was against it and criticized the Sultan for being too rash and overconfident in his abilities. On April 15, 1452, Mehmed ordered preparations to be made for the siege of Constantinople.

In April 1453, Mehmed laid siege to Constantinople. Although the city's defenders, led by Giovanni Giustiniani under Emperor Constantine XI Palaiologos's (1448–1453) authority, put up a heroic defense, without the benefit of outside aid their efforts were doomed. The formerly impregnable land walls were breached after two months of constant pounding by Mehmed's heavy artillery. In the predawn hours of May 29, 1453, Mehmed ordered an all-out assault on the battered ramparts. After a brief but vicious melee at the walls in which Giustiniani was severely injured coupled with Ottoman troops breaching the walls through a sally port door left open, the Ottoman troops were able to breach the walls and rout the defenders. According to Christian sources, Emperor Constantine died bravely rushing into the oncoming Ottoman troops not to be seen again. However, according to Ottoman sources such as Tursun Beg he threw off his mantle and attempted to flee before being cut down by an injured Ottoman soldier. The Ottoman Army broke through and swept over the city. Constantinople, for a millennium considered by many Europeans the divinely ordained capital of the Christian Roman Empire, fell to Mehmed and was transformed into what many Muslims considered the divinely ordained capital of the Islamic Ottoman Empire. The fabled city's imperial legacy lived on. After the conquest, the sultan had his grand vizier Çandarlı Halil Pasha killed. His following four granviziers were of devshirme origin. During the growth of the Empire Turks seldom were appointed to the high positions.

Artistic depictions of the conquest of Constantinople on 29 May 1453 by Mehmed the Conqueror (Fatih Sultan Mehmed Khan Ghazi)
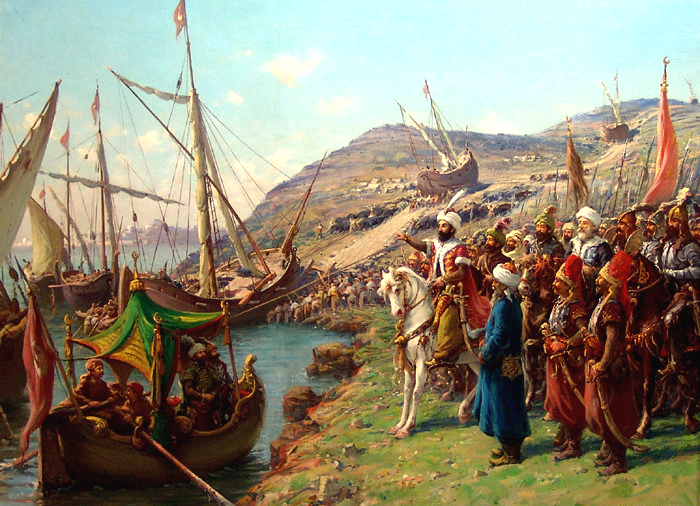
Fatih Sultan Mehmed's land transport of the Ottoman Navy from Galata into the Golden Horn by Fausto Zonaro (1854–1929)

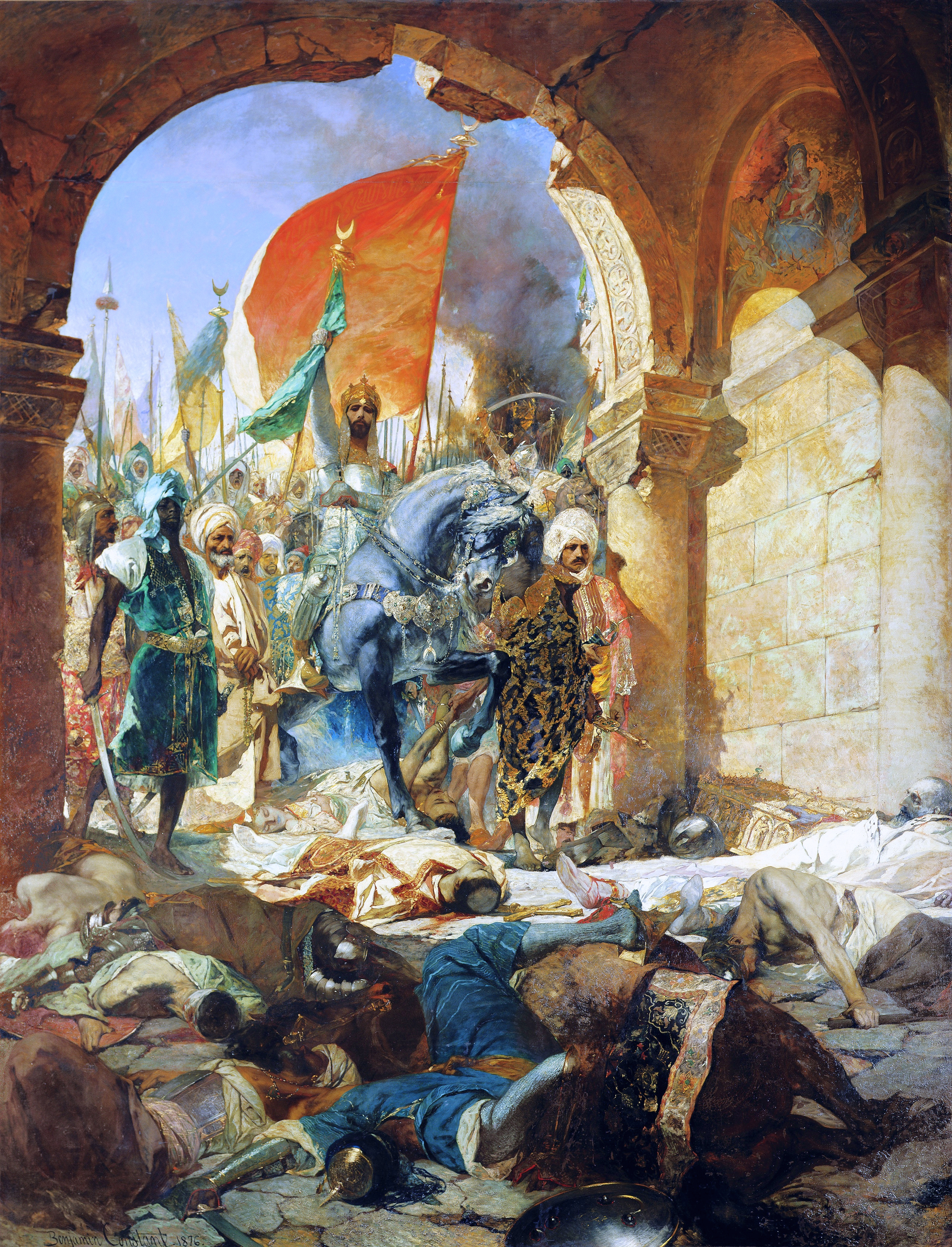
Entry of Mehmed II into Constantinople by Jean-Joseph Benjamin-Constant (1845–1902)

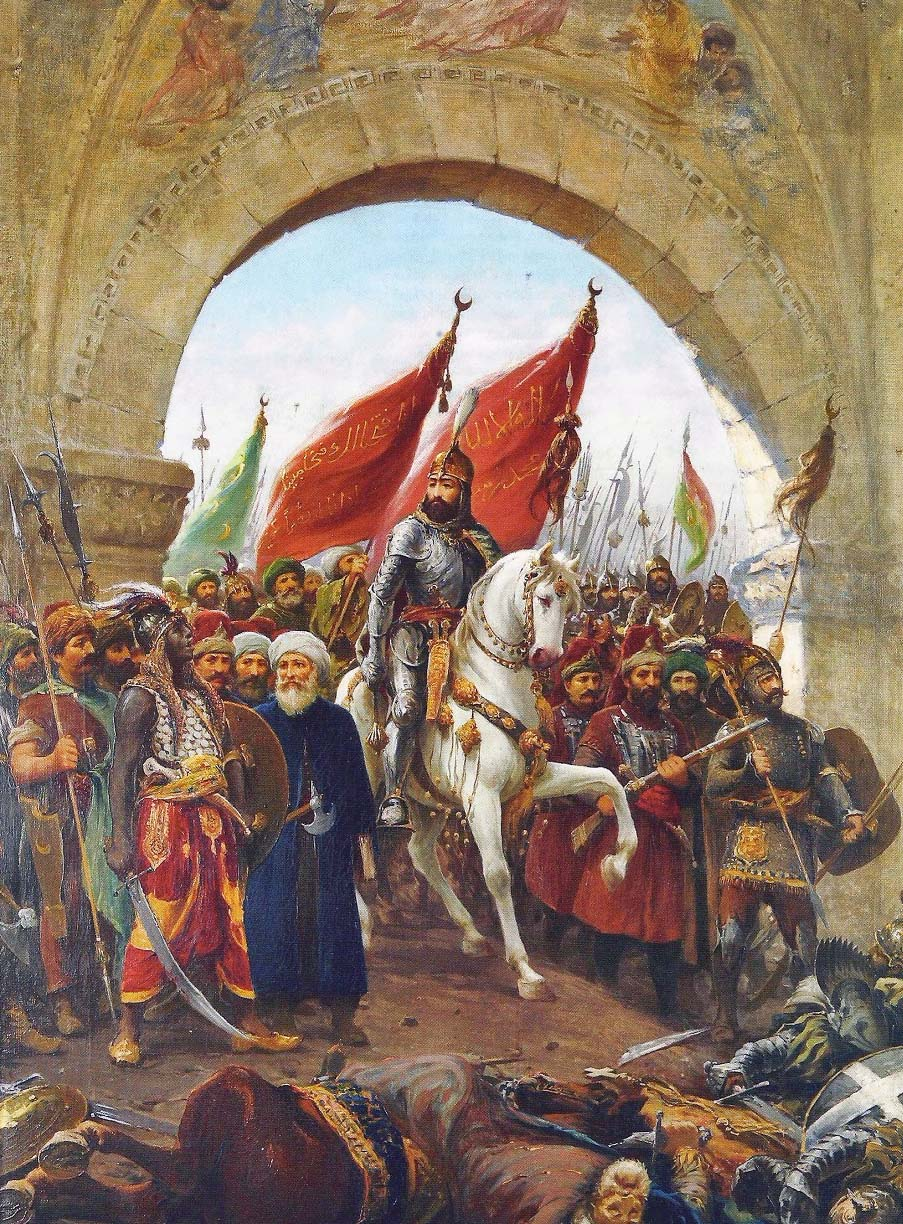
The Conquest of Constantinople by Fausto Zonaro (1854–1929)

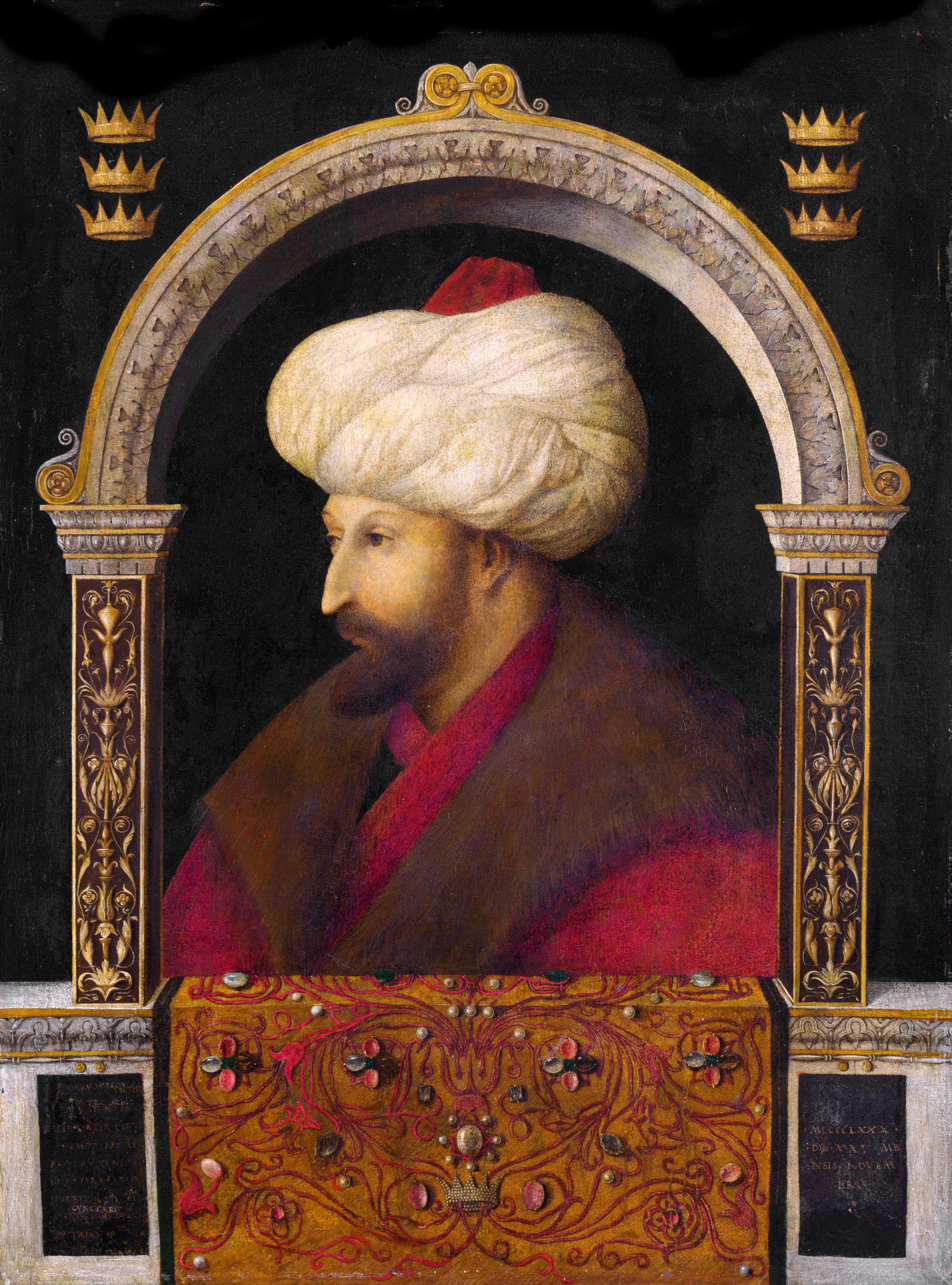
Sultan Mehmet II by Gentile Bellini, 1479 (National Gallery, London

Following the capture of Constantinople, Mehmed built the Topkapı Palace in 1462 and moved the Ottoman capital there from Adrianople. Mehmed had himself titled "Kaiser-i-Rum", or "Roman Caesar", and modelled the state after the old Byzantine Empire, thinking of himself as the successor to the Roman throne. Later, when he invaded Otranto, his goal was to capture Rome and reunite the Roman Empire for the first time since 751. Justinian's cathedral of Hagia Sophia was converted into an imperial mosque, as eventually were numerous other churches and monasteries. The rights of non-Muslim inhabitants were protected to ensure continuity and stability for commercial activities. Never fully recovered from the sack of 1204, and suffering from Byzantium's two centuries of near poverty, Constantinople by the time of Mehmed's conquest was but a hollow shell of its former self. Its population had dwindled, and much property was either abandoned or in a state of disrepair. The sultan immediately began to repopulate the city. Civic and private properties were offered to the public to entice much-needed skilled artisans, craftsmen, and traders of all religions and ethnicities back to the city. Newly conquered Constantinople rapidly grew into a multiethnic, multicultured, and bustling economic, political, and cultural center for the Ottoman state, whose distant frontiers guaranteed it peace, security, and prosperity.

== Gallery ==
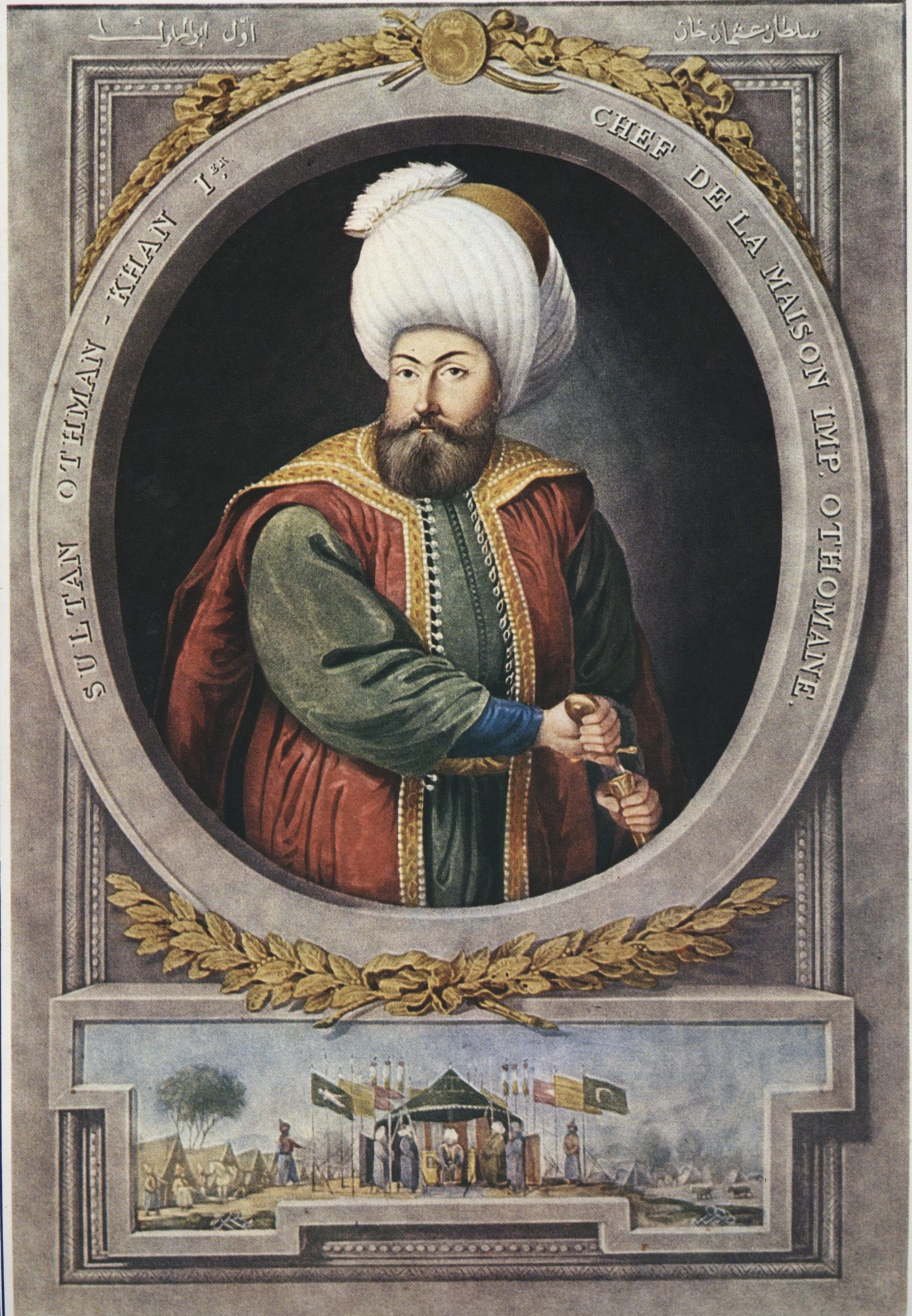
Osman I

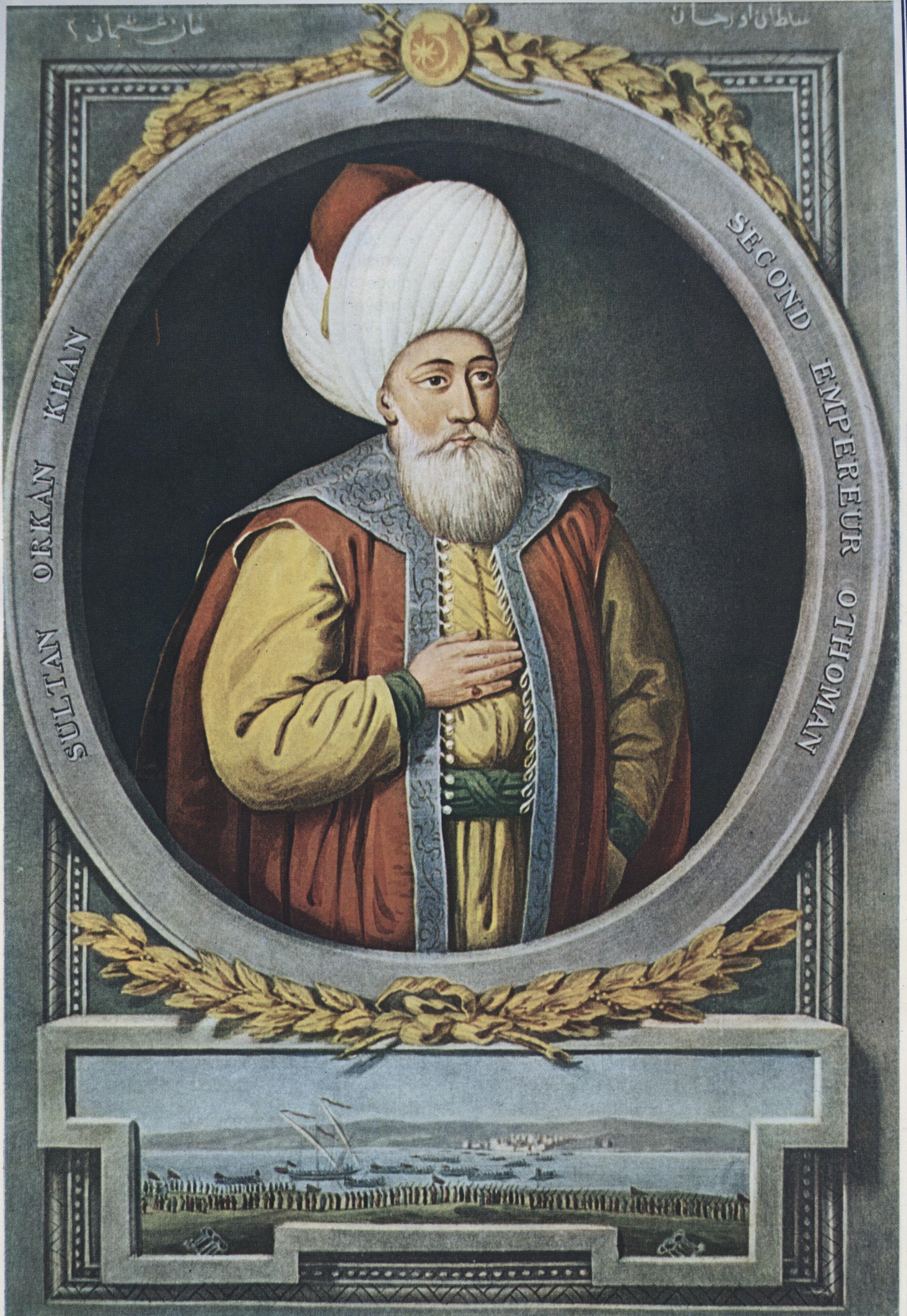
Orhan

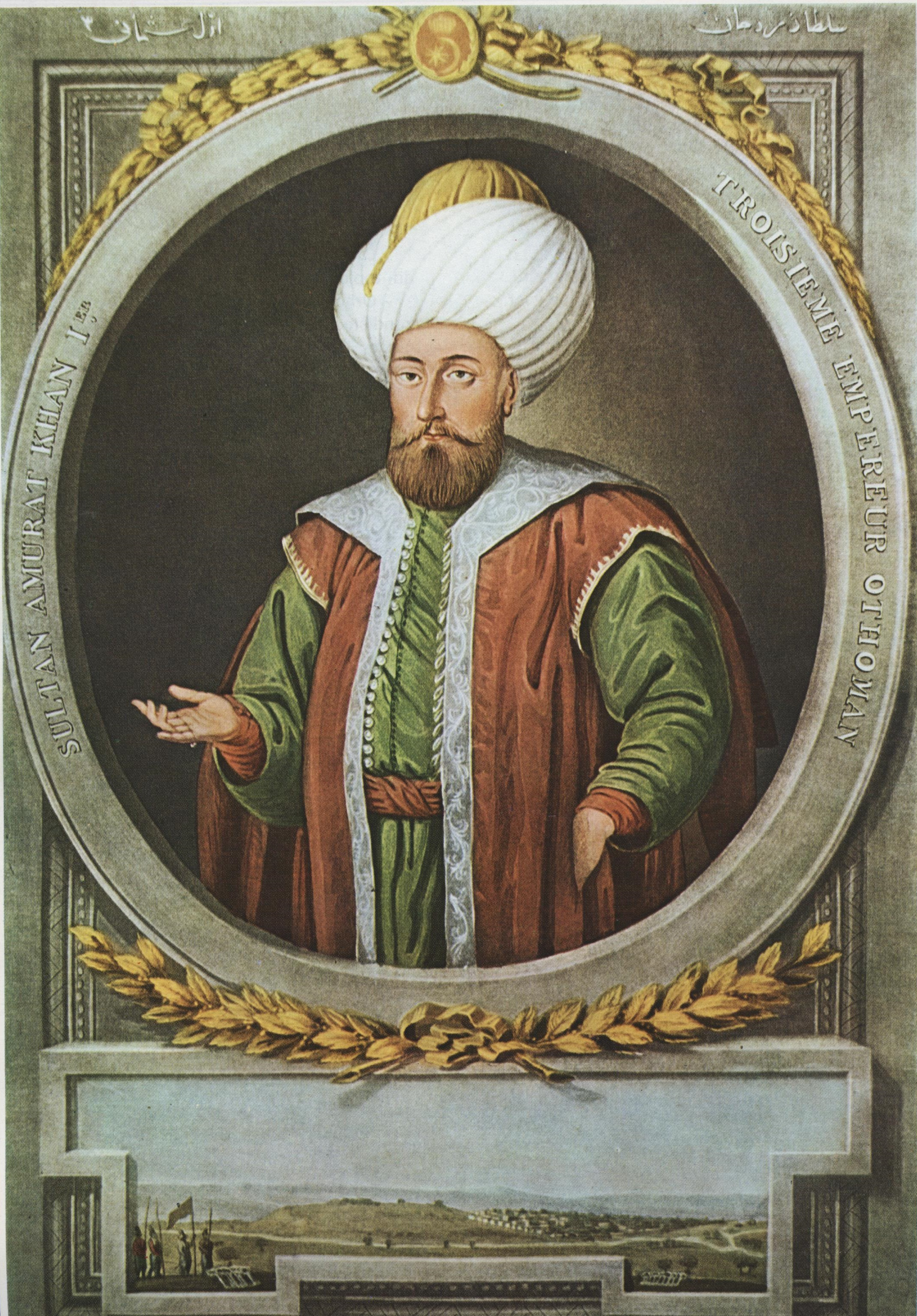
Murad I

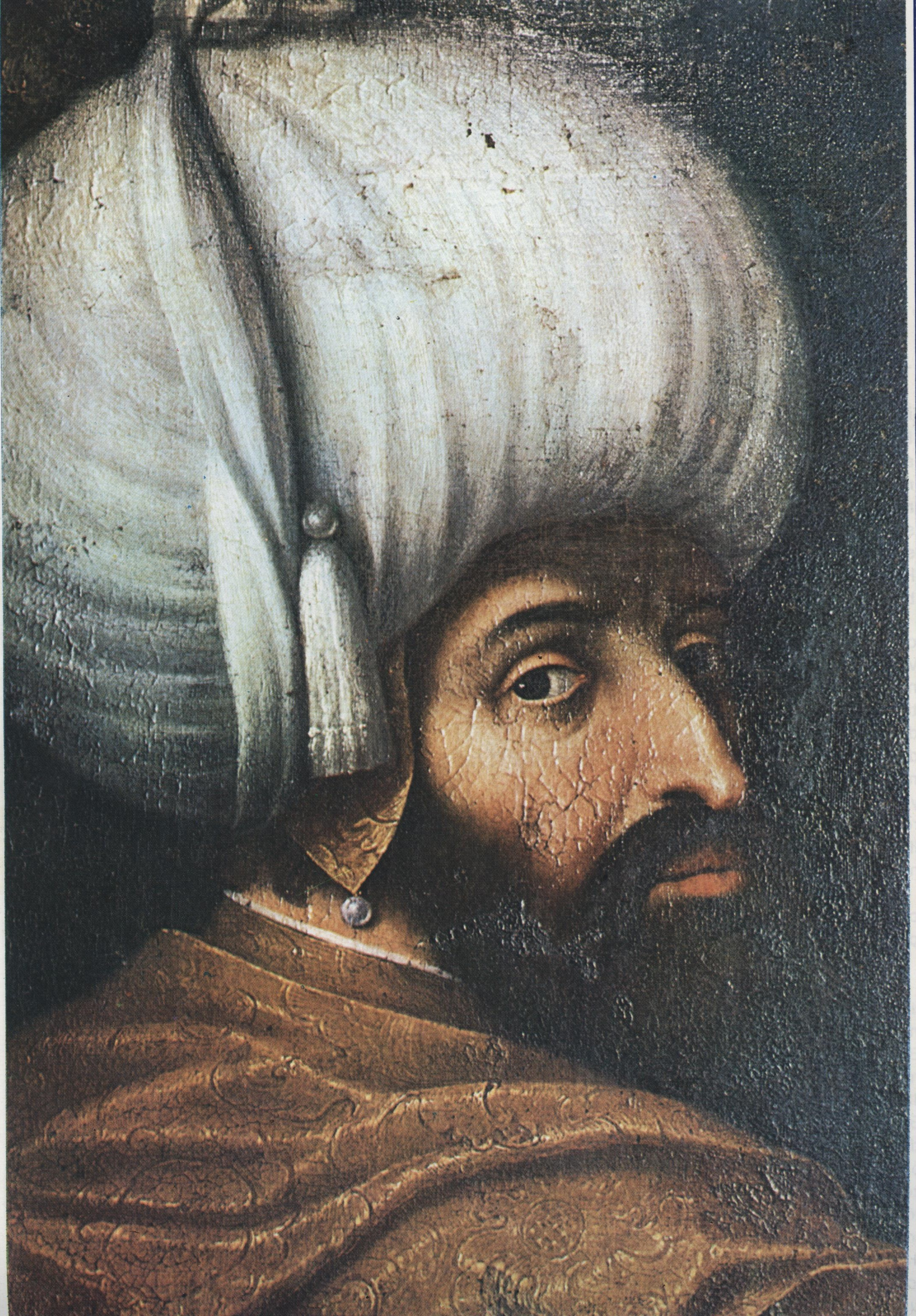
Bayezid I

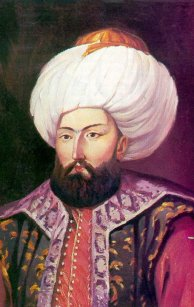
Mehmed I

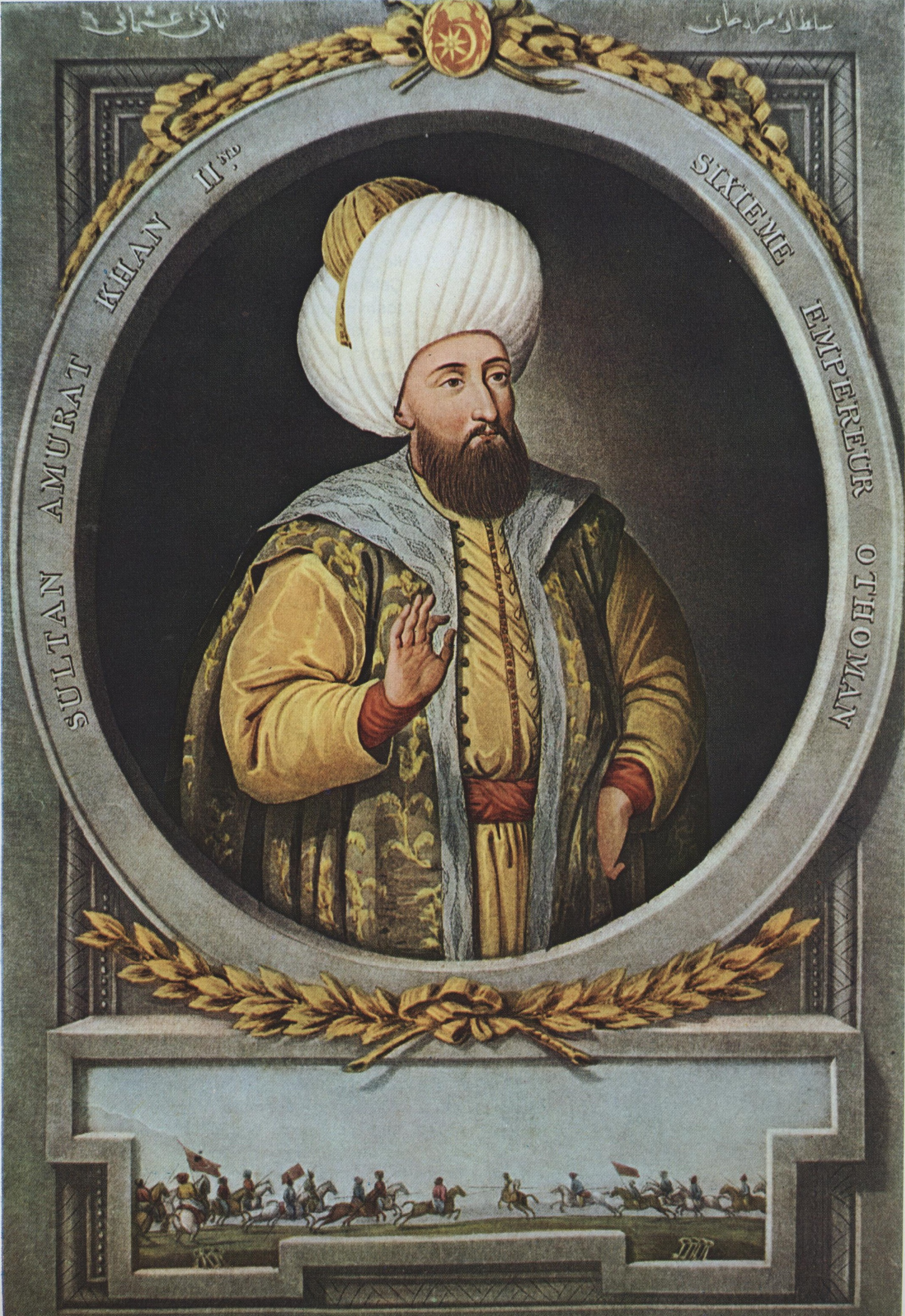
Murad II

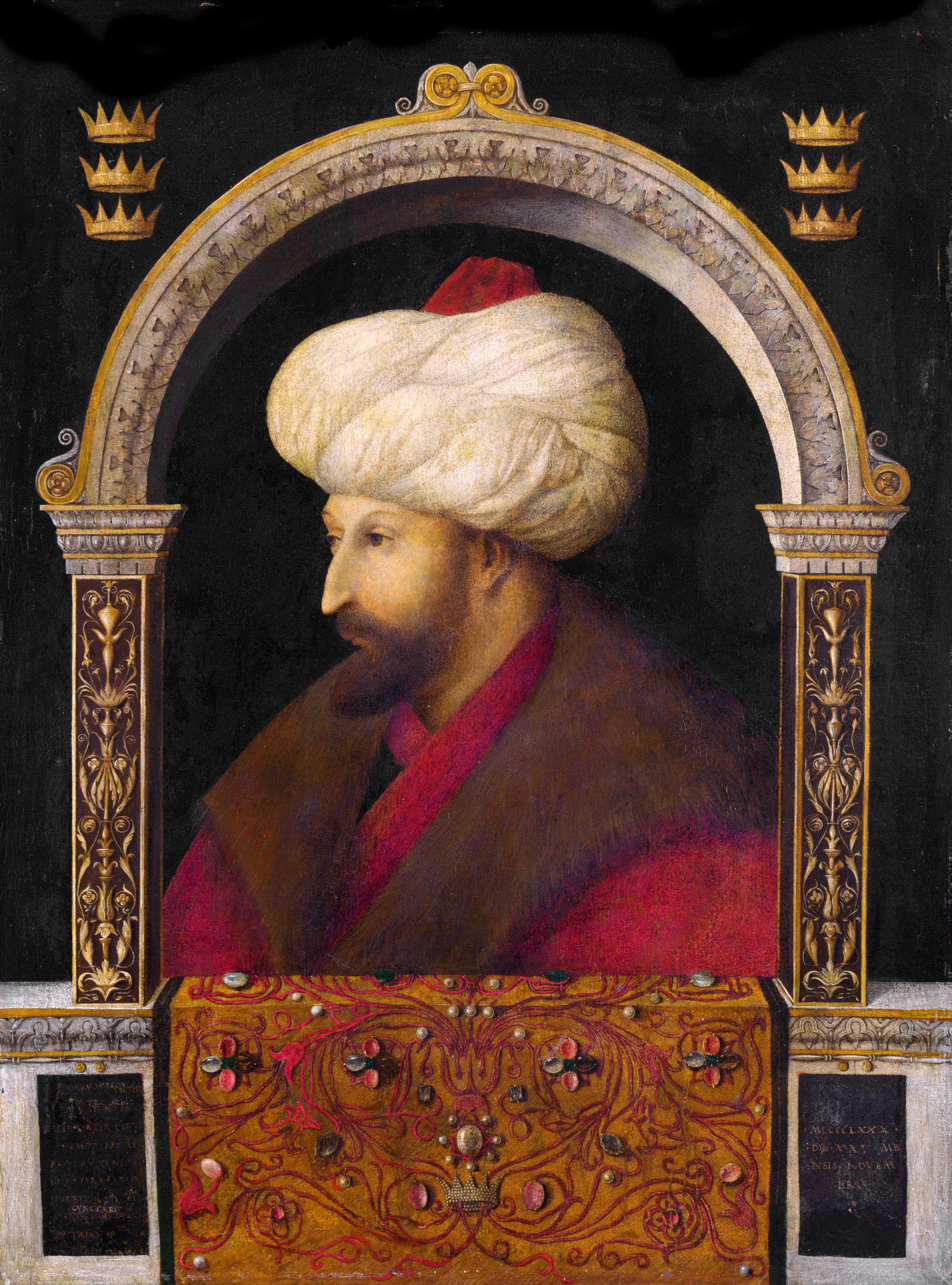
Mehmed II

== Bibliography ==
- Ágoston, Gábor; Bruce Masters, eds. (2009). Encyclopedia of the Ottoman Empire. New York: Facts on File. ISBN 978-0-8160-6259-1.
- Finkel, Caroline (2005). Osman's Dream: The Story of the Ottoman Empire, 1300-1923. Basic Books. ISBN 978-0-465-02396-7.
- Imber, Colin (2009). The Ottoman Empire, 1300–1650: The Structure of Power (Second ed.). Basingstoke: Palgrave Macmillan. ISBN 978-1-1370-1406-1.
- Kafadar, Cemal (1995). Between Two Worlds: The Construction of the Ottoman State. University of California Press. ISBN 978-0-520-20600-7.
- Kafadar, Cemal (2007). "A Rome of One's Own: Cultural Geography and Identity in the Lands of Rum". Muqarnas. 24: 7–25. doi:10.1163/22118993-90000108.
- Lindner, Rudi P. (1983). Nomads and Ottomans in Medieval Anatolia. Bloomington: Indiana University Press. ISBN 0-933070-12-8.
- Lowry, Heath (2003). The Nature of the Early Ottoman State. Albany: SUNY Press. ISBN 0-7914-5636-6.
- Murphey, Rhoads (2008). Exploring Ottoman Sovereignty: Tradition, Image, and Practice in the Ottoman Imperial Household, 1400-1800. London: Continuum. ISBN 978-1-84725-220-3.
- Schamiloglu, Uli (2004). "The Rise of the Ottoman Empire: The Black Death in Medieval Anatolia and its Impact on Turkish Civilization". In Yavari, Neguin; Lawrence G. Potter; Jean-Marc Ran Oppenheim (eds.). Views From the Edge: Essays in Honor of Richard W. Bulliet. New York: Columbia University Press. ISBN 0-23113472-X.
- Wittek, Paul (1938). The Rise of the Ottoman Empire. Royal Asiatic Society.
- Zachariadou, Elizabeth, ed. (1991). The Ottoman Emirate (1300-1389). Rethymnon: Crete University Press.
