= Ghaza thesis =

Historical narrative

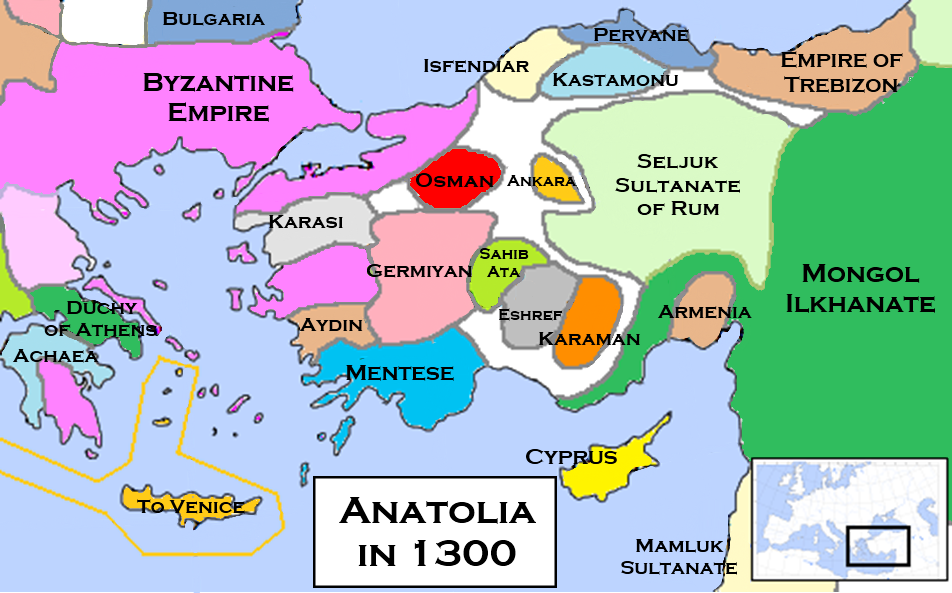
A rough map depicting Anatolia in the year 1300, when the Ottoman state (red) first came into existence.

The Ghaza or Ghazi thesis (from Ottoman Turkish: غزا, ġazā, "holy war", or simply "raid") (Note: The Cambridge History of Turkey defines ghaza as "a raid for plunder, later came to mean holy war fought for Islam.") is a since disputed historical paradigm first formulated by Paul Wittek which has been used to interpret the nature of the Ottoman Empire during the earliest period of its history, the fourteenth century, and its subsequent history. The thesis addresses the question of how the Ottomans were able to expand from a small principality on the frontier of the Byzantine Empire into a centralized, intercontinental empire. According to the Ghaza thesis, the Ottomans accomplished this by attracting recruits to fight for them in the name of Jihad against the non-believers. Such a warrior was known in Ottoman Turkish as a ghazi, and thus this thesis sees the early Ottoman state as a "Ghazi State", defined by an ideology of holy war. The Ghaza thesis dominated early Ottoman historiography throughout much of the twentieth century before coming under increasing criticism beginning in the 1980s. Historians now generally reject the Ghaza thesis, and consequently the idea that Ottoman expansion was primarily fueled by holy war, but disagree about what hypothesis to replace it with.

== Formation of the Ghaza thesis ==
The Ghaza thesis was first formulated in the 1930s by Turkish historian Fuat Köprülü and Austrian historian Paul Wittek. Partly in response to contemporary Orientalist historians, who tried to marginalize the role of the Turks in Ottoman state formation, Köprülü formulated what was to become the nationalized view of early Ottoman history. According to Köprülü, the Ottoman polity was formed by Turkish tribes fleeing the advance of the Mongol Empire, built upon Turkish tribal manpower, and administered by men from the Anatolian hinterland experienced in the Turco-Muslim political tradition of the Seljuks.

Paul Wittek, responding to Köprülü's claims, accepted the Turco-Muslim basis of the early Ottoman state, agreeing that it grew out of the already highly developed civilization of Seljuk Anatolia and was fundamentally shaped by the unique conditions of the Byzantine frontier. Yet rather than Turkish ethnicity and tribal connections, he placed his primary emphasis upon the role of Islam. For Wittek, the Ottomans were first and foremost Islamic holy warriors. His primary evidence for this included the titles adopted by early Ottoman rulers, including an inscription erected in Bursa in 1337 describing Orhan, the second Ottoman ruler, as "ghazi, son of ghazi". Wittek also relied upon the work of the early fifteenth-century Ottoman poet Ahmedi, who likewise described the early Ottoman rulers as ghazis. Thus, in this formulation, the early Ottoman polity was built upon an "ideology of Holy War", and was able to grow powerful by attracting warriors to join in conquering the Christians of Anatolia and the Balkans. The early Ottomans harnessed the religious and martial energies of the frontier (uc) between the crumbling Byzantine and Seljuk states in order to conquer an empire. It was Wittek's formulation which became generally (though not unanimously) accepted among Western historians of the Ottoman Empire for much of the twentieth century.

== Revisionism ==
The fundamental problem with the study of the fourteenth-century Ottomans is the lack of surviving documentation from that time period. Not a single authentic written Ottoman document has been found from the time of Osman I, the first Ottoman ruler. Historians are thus forced to rely upon sources produced long after the events they purport to describe. Ottoman studies have thus benefited from the techniques of literary criticism, allowing historians to properly analyze Ottoman literary works from later periods.

The Ghaza thesis came under attack from numerous scholars beginning in the 1980s. (Note: Such early critics included G. Káldy-Nagy, R. C. Jennings, Colin Heywood, Colin Imber, Şinasi Tekin, and Feridun Emecen.) Critics drew attention to the fact that the early Ottomans acted in ways contrary to what one would expect from zealous religious warriors. They were not strictly orthodox Muslims, but rather tolerated many heterodox and syncretic beliefs and practices. They also willingly recruited Byzantines into their ranks and fought wars against other Muslims. Thus rather than describing reality, later Ottoman writers who characterized their ancestors as ghazis were "adorning [them] with higher ideals", when in fact their original motivations had been much more mundane. For Ottomans writing in the fifteenth century, presenting the earlier Ottoman rulers as ghazis served their political objectives. In emphasizing the mythical and legendary quality of the stories presented by Ottoman writers, the historian Colin Imber has gone so far as to declare the entire period a "black hole", the truth about which can never truly be known.

=== The Ottomans as a tribal group ===
While many scholars criticized the Ghaza thesis, few sought an alternative to replace it. Rudi Paul Lindner was the first to try in his 1983 publication Nomads and Ottomans in Medieval Anatolia, in which he argued that the peculiarities of early Ottoman activity could best be explained through tribalism. Lindner saw tribalism through the lens of anthropology, which views tribes as organizations based not on shared bloodlines, but on shared political interests. Early Ottoman raids against the Byzantines were motivated not by religious zeal, but by the nomadic tribe's need to engage in predation against settled society. The Ottomans were able to incorporate Byzantines and fight against Muslims because their organization was fundamentally tribal, which allowed them to assimilate individuals and groups of diverse backgrounds. Citing various instances of their heterodoxy, Lindner even suggested that the early Ottomans may have been more pagan than Muslim. In Lindner's view, this tribal inclusiveness began to break down during the reign of Osman's son Orhan (r. 1323/24–1362), as the Ottomans began to shift from being nomadic pastoralists into settled agricultural society. Orhan subsequently attracted Islamic scholars to his realm, who brought with them ideas about ghaza, and it was from them that he adopted the ghaza ideology in time for it to appear in his 1337 inscription in Bursa.

=== Ghaza as one of many factors ===
In his 1995 book Between Two Worlds: The Construction of the Ottoman State, Turkish scholar Cemal Kafadar addressed criticism of the Ghaza thesis by arguing that previous scholars had drawn too great a distinction between "orthodox" and "heterodox" Islam – one could consider oneself a legitimate Muslim without conforming exactly to a scholarly orthodoxy. Furthermore, Kafadar argued that the early Ottomans' very idea of ghaza may have differed from that of "orthodox" Islam. Citing contemporary Anatolian legends, he noted that the same figure could be portrayed as a ghazi while still cooperating with Christians. In Kafadar's view, ghaza was a real ideology which gave shape to frontier warriors as a social class, not simply an import from Muslim scholars. However, the terms ghaza and ghazi had a range of different meanings which shifted over time, sometimes referring to religiously motivated warriors and sometimes not. It was nevertheless ever present, and served as simply one out of many motivating forces behind Ottoman expansion.

=== Ghaza as a non-religious term ===
Following Kafadar, the next major reformulation of the theory of Ottoman origins was carried out by Heath Lowry in 2003. Lowry attacked Wittek's sources, arguing that Ahmedi's literary work cannot be interpreted as factual history, but rather was a fictionalized idealization of the past. According to Lowry, the terms ghaza and ghazi when used in the fourteenth and fifteenth-century Ottoman context had entirely non-religious meanings, as ghaza was interchangeable with the term akın, simply referring to a military raid. Many akıncıs (raiders) were also Christians, and would thus be very out of place in an army devoted to Islamic holy war. Ottoman warriors were thus motivated by the desire to win plunder and slaves, not to fight in the name of Islam. It was only certain writers, educated in the Islamic tradition, who tried to draw a connection between the secular ghaza of the frontier warriors and the religious ghaza as understood by Muslim intellectuals.

== New consensus ==
While they differ in many particulars, these new perspectives on early Ottoman history share in the belief that early Ottoman expansion was not primarily fueled by an ideology of Islamic holy war. Historians now generally regard ghaza as having been "a much more fluid undertaking, sometimes referring to actions that were nothing more than raids, sometimes meaning a deliberate holy war, but most often combining a mixture of these elements". This view also appears in Caroline Finkel's 2005 scholarly survey of Ottoman history, Osman's Dream.

== See also ==
- Rise of the Ottoman Empire
- Ottoman decline thesis

== Bibliography ==
- Ágoston, Gábor; Bruce Masters, eds. (2009). Encyclopedia of the Ottoman Empire. New York: Facts on File. ISBN 978-0-8160-6259-1.
- Finkel, Caroline (2005). Osman's Dream: The Story of the Ottoman Empire, 1300–1923. Basic Books. ISBN 978-0-465-02396-7.
- Imber, Colin (1991). "The Legend of Osman Gazi". In Elizabeth Zachariadou (ed.). The Ottoman Emirate (1300–1389). Rethymnon: Crete University Press. pp. 67–76.
- Jennings, Ronald C. "Some thoughts on the gazi-thesis." Wiener Zeitschrift für die Kunde des Morgenlandes 76 (1986): 151-161 online.
- Kafadar, Cemal (1995). Between Two Worlds: The Construction of the Ottoman State. University of California Press. ISBN 978-0-520-20600-7.
- Köprülü, Mehmet Fuat (1935). Les origines de l'empire ottoman. Paris.
- Lindner, Rudi P. (1983). Nomads and Ottomans in Medieval Anatolia. Bloomington: Indiana University Press. ISBN 978-0-933070-12-7.
- Lowry, Heath (2003). The Nature of the Early Ottoman State. Albany: SUNY Press. ISBN 978-0-7914-5636-1.
- Wittek, Paul (1938). The Rise of the Ottoman Empire. Royal Asiatic Society.
