= Imber (surname) =

Imber is a surname. Notable people with the surname include:

- Annabelle Clinton Imber, American jurist
- Colin Imber, lecturer in Turkish studies
- Gerald Imber, American plastic surgeon
- Lya Imber (1914–1981), Venezuelan medical doctor
- Mike Imber (1940–2011), New Zealand seabird biologist
- Naftali Herz Imber (1856–1909), Galicia-born Jewish poet and Zionist
- Nicky Imber (1920–1996), Austrian-born Jewish sculptor
- Shmuel Yankev Imber (1889–1942), Jewish poet writing in Yiddish and Polish
- Suzanne Imber (born 1983), British planetary scientist
