= Paul Wittek =

Austrian Orientalist and historian

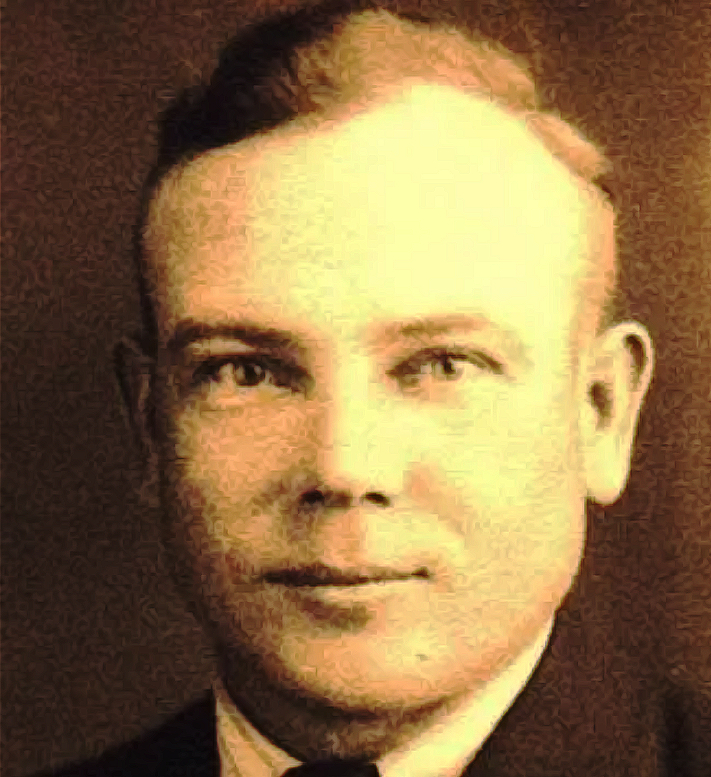
- Paul Wittek, c. 1938
- Born: 11 January 1894; Baden bei Wien, Cisleithania, Austria-Hungary
- Died: 13 June 1978 (aged 84); Eastcote, England

Academic background
- Education: University of Vienna
- Thesis: Die Entstehung der Zenturienordnung. Studie zur ältesten römischen Sozial- und Verfassungsgeschichte (1920)
- Influences: Ahmet Refik Altınay, Vasilij Bartolʹd, Stefan George, Mehmet Fuat Köprülü, Friedrich Kraelitz, Johannes Heinrich Mordtmann, Max Weber

Academic work
- Discipline: History; Oriental studies
- Sub-discipline: Ottoman studies
- Institutions: School of Oriental and African Studies
- Doctoral students: Victor Louis Ménage
- Notable students: Peter Charanis, Stanford J. Shaw, Elizabeth Zachariadou
- Main interests: early Ottoman history
- Notable works: The Rise of the Ottoman Empire (1938)
- Notable ideas: Ghaza thesis

Paul Wittek (11 January 1894 – 13 June 1978) was an Austrian Orientalist and historian. His 1938 thesis on the rise of the Ottoman Empire, known as the ghazi thesis, argues that the driving force behind Ottoman state-building was the expansion of Islam. Until the 1980s, his theory was the most influential and dominant explanation of the formation of the Ottoman Empire.

== Biography ==
Wittek was conscripted at the outbreak of World War I as a reserve officer to an Austro-Hungarian artillery regiment. In October 1914, he suffered a head wound in Galicia and was taken to Vienna to recover. Subsequently, he served first on the Isonzo Front and in 1917 was drafted as a military adviser to the Ottoman Empire, where he was stationed in Istanbul and Syria until the war ended. During this time Wittek learned Ottoman Turkish and acquired the patronage of Johannes Heinrich Mordtmann, the former German consul in Istanbul. Once the war ended, Wittek returned to Vienna and resumed his studies in ancient history, which he had already begun before the war. In 1920 he obtained his doctorate with a thesis on early Roman social and constitutional history, after which he dedicated himself to the study of Ottoman history.

Wittek was in Vienna during the emergence of the fledgling discipline of Ottoman studies. He was co-editor (with his mentor Kraelitz) and contributor to the first scholarly journal in this field, called Mitteilungen zur osmanischen Geschichte (Notes on Ottoman History), of which two volumes appeared between 1921 and 1926. For his livelihood Wittek worked as a journalist for the conservative literary and political fortnightly Österreichische Rundschau. After it ceased publication in 1924, he moved back to Istanbul and wrote for the German-language Türkische Post, but soon became involved in the creation of the German Archaeological Institute in Istanbul, where he received an appointment through the German Foreign Office by late 1926, initially as an Assistant in Turkology. By 1929 Wittek was a specialist (Referent) and worked closely with the Director Martin Schede to establish a research programme spanning Classical and Christian antiquities as well as Turkish art in collaboration with German Byzantinists and Orientalists, among them Hellmut Ritter as the representative of the German Oriental Society in Istanbul, Paul Kahle and Hans Lietzmann. Wittek's activities included study tours to collect material on early Ottoman epigraphy. He also examined beylik-period architecture and collaborated with Friedrich Sarre and Karl Wulzinger on a monograph of late medieval Miletus under Islamic rule. In Istanbul, he met and befriended the Russian Orientalist Vasilij Bartolʹd. He claimed a part in the collective effort of Turkish historians to put a halt to the sale of Ottoman treasury archives to Bulgaria as scrap paper by İsmet İnönü's government in 1931.

After Hitler's rise to power in Germany, Wittek resigned from his Istanbul post in the summer of 1933 due to his opposition to the Nazi Party and moved with his family to Belgium in 1934, where he worked at the Institute for Byzantine Studies in Brussels with Henri Grégoire. After the German attack on Belgium Wittek fled in a small boat to England, where he was interned as an enemy alien. Thanks to the support of British Orientalists, in particular Hamilton Gibb, he was finally released and found a job at the University of London. After the war he returned to his family, who had remained in Belgium. In 1948 he came to London and took up the newly created Chair of Turkish at the School of Oriental and African Studies (SOAS), which he held until his retirement in 1961.

Wittek, who was a devoted member of the George Circle (along with the fellow medievalist and academic refugee Ernst Kantorowicz), published relatively little and mostly in short form, but became very influential within his discipline. His only book-length studies, on the principality of Menteşe and on the rise of the Ottoman Empire, appeared in the 1930s. In the latter Wittek formulated his ghazi thesis, according to which the ideology of sectarian struggle was the major cohesive factor in the formative phase of the Ottoman Empire. The ghazi thesis was, until Rudi Paul Lindner's nomad thesis in the 1980s, the prevailing view of the emergence of the Ottoman Empire.

== Books ==
- Das Fürstentum Mentesche. Studie zur Geschichte Westkleinasiens im 13.–15. Jh., Istanbul 1934
- Das islamische Milet (with Karl Wulzinger and Friedrich Sarre), Berlin 1935 (Milet III.4)
- The Rise of the Ottoman Empire, London 1938
- Turkish (Lund Humphries Modern Language Readers), London 1945; revised 2nd edition, 1956
- La formation de l'Empire ottoman (Variorum Collected Studies, 153), ed. V.L. Ménage, London 1982
