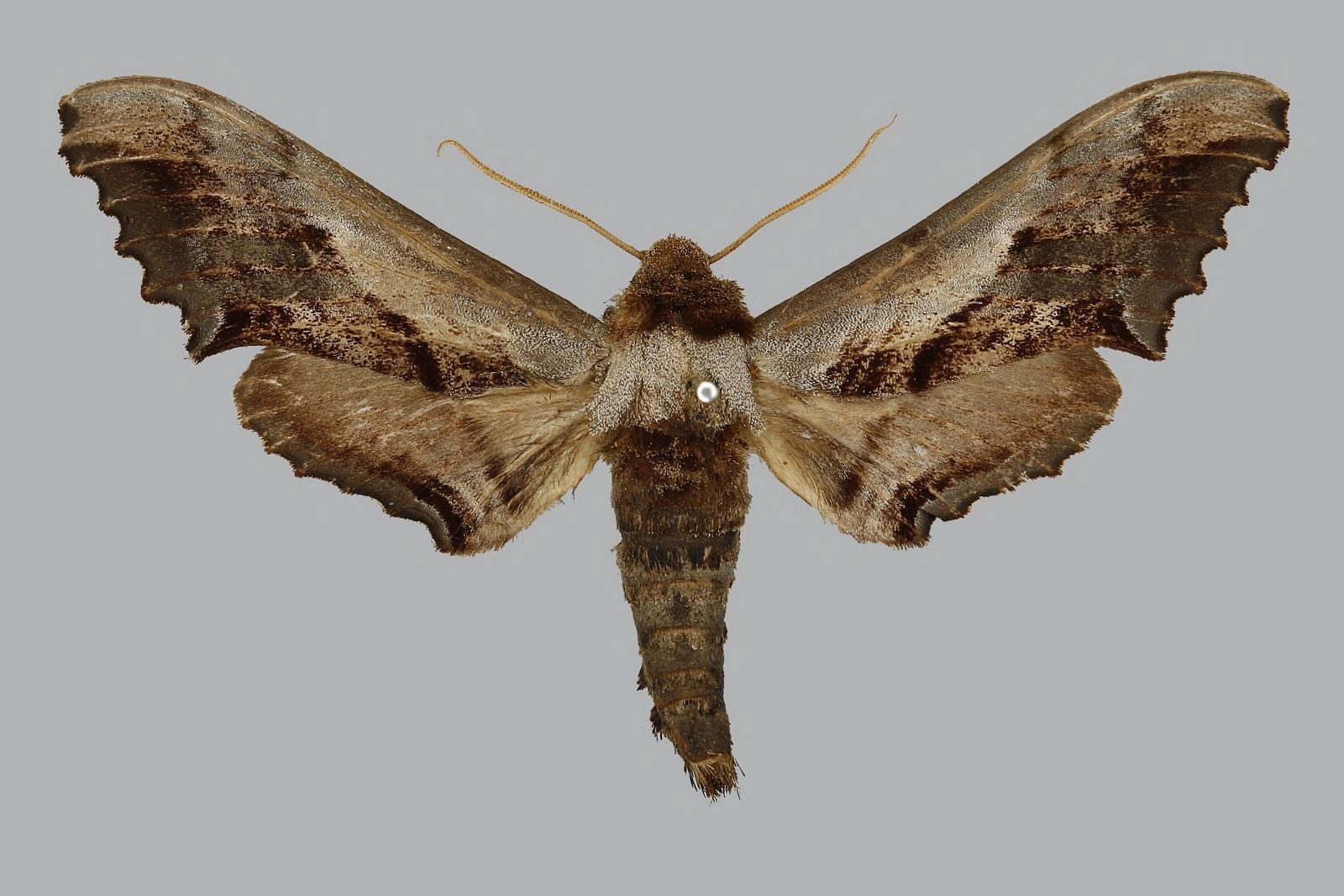

Scientific classification
- Kingdom: Animalia
- Phylum: Arthropoda
- Class: Insecta
- Order: Lepidoptera
- Family: Sphingidae
- Subfamily: Smerinthinae
- Tribe: Smerinthini
- Genus: Imber; Moulds, Tuttle & Lane, 2010
- Species: I. tropicus

Binomial name
- Imber tropicus (Moulds, 1983)

Synonyms
- Langia tropicus Moulds, 1983; Laugia tropicus

= Imber tropicus =

Species of moth

Imber tropicus is a moth of the family Sphingidae and only member of the genus Imber. It was described by Maxwell Sydney Moulds in 1983. It is found in the tropical north of Australia, including the Northern Territory, Queensland and Western Australia.

The larvae probably feed on Rosaceae species.
