= Colin Imber =

Lecturer in Turkish studies at Manchester University, UK

Colin Imber is a retired lecturer of Turkish studies who previously taught at Manchester University, UK.

He completed his Oriental studies at Cambridge University, where he defended his doctorate on "The Ottoman Fleet in the Age of Sultan Suleiman I (1520-1566)". His research interest is focused on the history of the Ottoman Empire until the 17th century and on Islamic law, in particular on the system of Ottoman law, until the 17th century.

He is considered as "perhaps the leading, and...certainly the most productive, of the painfully few Ottoman historians currently working in British universities."

He is noted for his opposition to Paul Wittek's "Ghaza thesis".

== Publications ==
- The Ottoman Empire 1300–1481, Isis Press, Istanbul 1990
- Studies in Ottoman History and Law, Isis Press, Istanbul 1996
- The Ottoman Empire, 1300–1650: The Structure of Power, Palgrave Macmillan 2002; 2nd Revised Edition, Palgrave Macmillan 2009; 3rd Edition, Red Globe Press 2019
- Ebu's-su'ud: The Islamic Legal Tradition, Stanford University Press (Stanford, CA), 1997.
