= Inzer (surname) =

Inzer is a surname. Notable people with the surname include:

- Drew Inzer (born 1979), American football offensive lineman
- James C. Inzer (1887–1967), 16th Lieutenant Governor of Alabama
- William H. Inzer (1906–1978), Justice of the Supreme Court of Mississippi

== See also ==
- Inzer Bass Wyatt (1907–1990), United States District Judge
