= Gerald Imber =

American plastic surgeon

- Education: State University of New York
- Occupation: Plastic Surgeon
- Website: https://www.drimber.com/

Gerald Imber is an American plastic surgeon, specializing in minimally invasive cosmetic surgery techniques to combat aging. He runs a private surgery practice in New York City and is an assistant clinical professor of surgery at the New York Hospital-Cornell Medical Center.

== Early life and education ==
Imber attended the State University of New York Downstate College of Medicine and trained as a surgeon at the Long Island Jewish Medical Center and at Kaiser Permanente Hospital in Los Angeles, California. He served in the Air Force for two years, and completes a residency in plastic surgery at the Weill-Cornell School of Medicine in New York, and stayed on as an attending surgeon.

== Career ==
In 1998, Imber published his first book, The Youth Corridor. He produces a line of medispa skincare products called The Youth Corridor.

Imber runs a medical practice in New York City. Since 1974, Imber has been an attending plastic surgeon at the New York Hospital-Cornell Medical Center and assistant clinical professor of surgery at the Cornell School of Medicine.

Imber has been featured or consulted in a number of media outlets. Imber was chosen by U.S. News & World Report and Castle Connolly as among a top plastic surgeon in the United States in 2013.

In 2023, Imber received notoriety for appearing in a TikTok, commenting on how long-distance running causes premature aging. Some dermatologists claimed this wasn't accurate.

== Works ==
In his book The Youth Corridor, published in 1998, Imber defines the youth corridor as that period of adult life when one looks her healthy, youthful best. In 1998, he published For Men Only, a guide to anti-aging techniques for men. In 2005, he wrote Absolute Beauty: A Renowned Plastic Surgeon's Guide to Looking Young Forever. In 2009, Imber released The New Youth Corridor, an updated version of the original.

In 2010, Imber published the book Genius on the Edge: The Bizarre Double Life of Dr.William Stewart Halsted, a biography of the man commonly credited with founding American surgery. Abigail Zuger, in the New York Times, called the book a particularly expert and thought-provoking narrative.

In 2013, Imber released Wendell Black, MD, which was published by HarperCollins.
