= Ottoman decline thesis =

Historical narrative

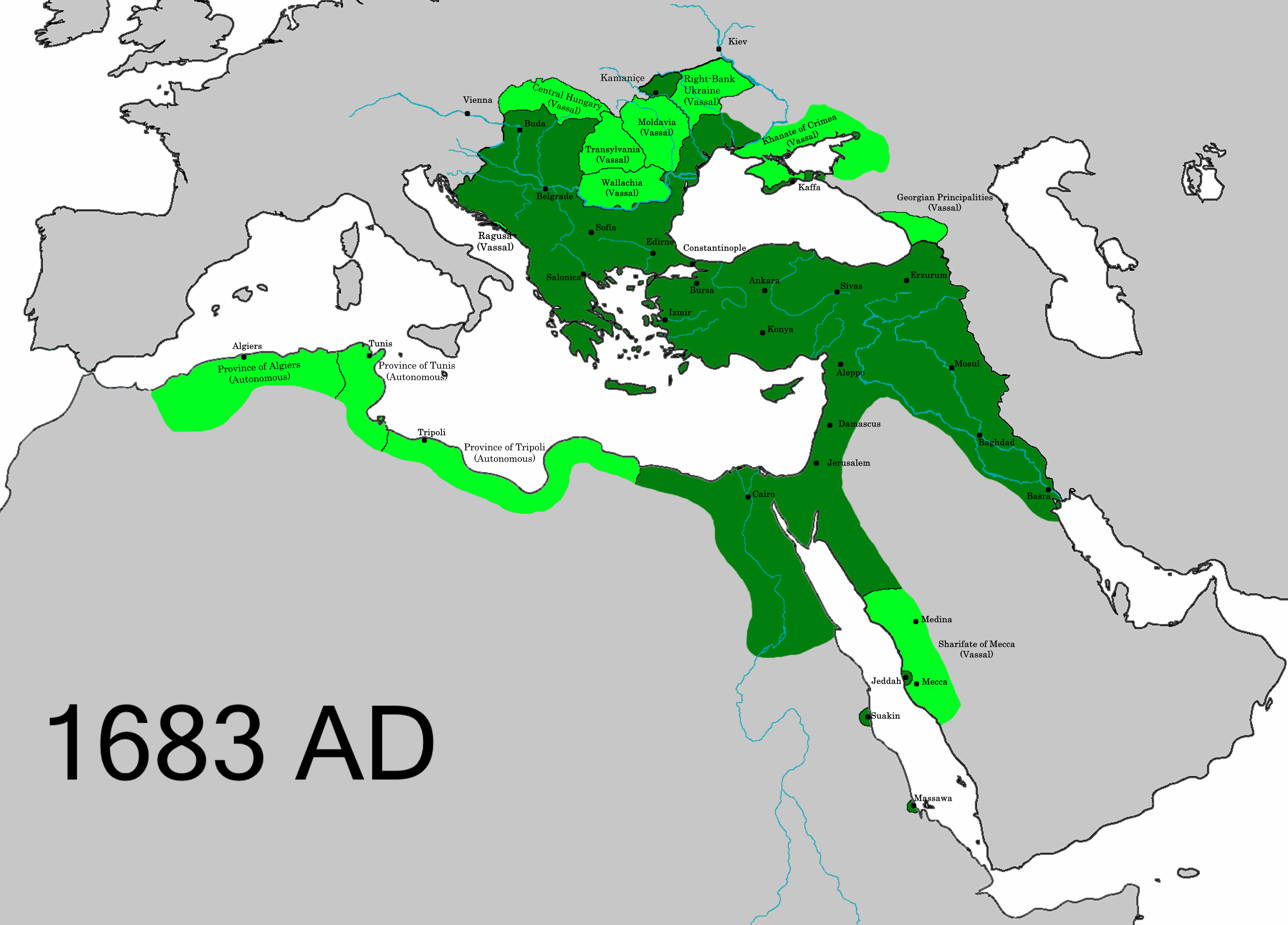
In 1683 the Ottoman Empire reached its maximum territorial extent in Europe, during the period formerly labelled as one of stagnation and decline.

The Ottoman decline thesis or Ottoman decline paradigm (Turkish: Osmanlı Gerileme Tezi) is an obsolete historical narrative which once played a dominant role in the study of the history of the Ottoman Empire. According to the decline thesis, following a golden age associated with the reign of Sultan Suleiman the Magnificent (r. 1520–1566), the empire gradually entered into a period of all-encompassing stagnation and decline from which it was never able to recover, lasting until the dissolution of the Ottoman Empire in 1923. This thesis was used throughout most of the twentieth century as the basis of both Western and Republican Turkish understanding of Ottoman history. However, by 1978, historians had begun to reexamine the fundamental assumptions of the decline thesis.

After the publication of numerous new studies throughout the 1980s, 1990s, and 2000s, and the reexamination of Ottoman history through the use of previously untapped sources and methodologies, academic historians of the Ottoman Empire achieved a consensus that the entire notion of Ottoman decline was a myth – that in fact, the Ottoman Empire remained a vigorous and dynamic state long after the death of Suleiman the Magnificent. The decline thesis has been criticized as "teleological", "regressive", "orientalist", "simplistic", and "one-dimensional", and described as "a concept which has no place in historical analysis". Scholars have thus "learned better than to discuss [it]."

Despite this dramatic paradigm shift among professional historians, the decline thesis continues to maintain a strong presence in popular history, as well as academic history written by scholars who are not specialists on the Ottoman Empire. In some cases this is due to the continued reliance by non-specialists on outdated and debunked works, and in others to certain political interests benefiting from the continued perpetuation of the decline narrative.

== Origins of the decline thesis ==
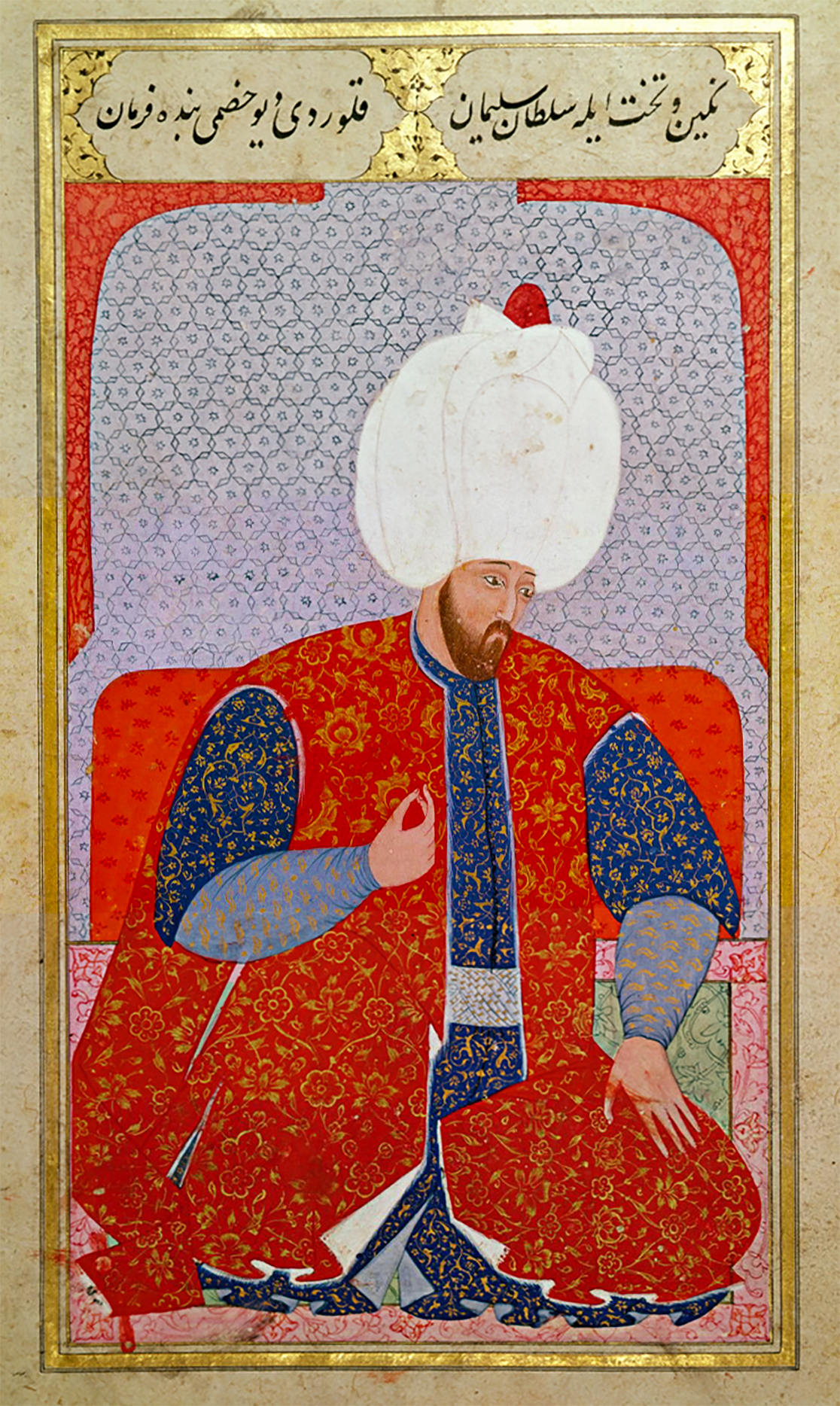
Sultan Suleiman I, whose reign was seen as constituting a golden age.

=== In the Ottoman Empire ===
The first attributions of decline to the Ottoman state came from Ottoman intellectuals themselves. Beginning much earlier, but greatly expanding during the seventeenth century, was the literary genre of nasihatname, or "Advice for Kings." This genre had a long history, appearing in earlier Muslim empires such as those of the Seljuks and Abbasids. Nasihatname literature was primarily concerned with order and disorder in state and society; it conceptualized the ruler as the embodiment of justice, whose duty it was to ensure that his subjects would receive that justice. This was often expressed through the concept of the Circle of Justice (Ottoman Turkish: dāʾire-i ʿadlīye). In this conception, the provision of justice by the ruler to his subjects would allow those subjects to prosper, strengthening the ruler in turn. Should this break down, society would cease to properly function.

Thus, many Ottomans writing in this genre, such as Mustafa Âlî, described the reign of Suleiman I as the most perfect manifestation of this system of justice, and put forth the idea that the empire had since declined from that golden standard. These writers viewed the changes which the empire had undergone as an inherently negative corruption of an idealized Suleimanic past. However, it is now recognized that rather than simply describing objective reality, they were often utilizing the genre of decline to voice their own personal complaints. For instance, Mustafa Âli's belief that the empire was declining was in large part motivated by frustration at his own failure to achieve promotions and court patronage. The primary goal of the nasihatname writers, then, may have simply been to protect their own personal or class status in a rapidly changing world.

=== In Western Europe ===
One of the first references of Ottoman decline in Western historiography can be found in Incrementa atque decrementa aulae othomanicae completed in 1717 by Dimitrie Cantemir and translated in English in 1734. He was followed in the nineteenth century, among others, by Joseph von Hammer-Purgstall, who knew Ottoman Turkish and adopted the idea directly from Ottoman nasihatname writers. Internal decline was thus thought of as an appropriate means of explaining the Ottomans' external military defeats, and acted also as a justification for European imperialism. The notion of a declining Ottoman/Islamic civilization was thus used as a foil for Western Civilization, in which the "decadent" Ottomans were contrasted with the "dynamic" West. Islam (as an all-encompassing civilizational category) often came to be portrayed as the polar opposite of the West, whereby Western societies valued freedom, rationality, and progress while Islam valued servility, superstition, and stagnation. Such depictions were perpetuated in the mid-twentieth century above all by the works of H.A.R. Gibb and Harold Bowen, and Bernard Lewis, who adhered to a civilizational conception of Islamic decline while modifying it with the new sociological paradigm of Modernization Theory. These views came under increasing criticism as historians began to reexamine their own fundamental assumptions about Ottoman and Islamic history, particularly after the publication of Edward Said's Orientalism in 1978.

== Tenets ==
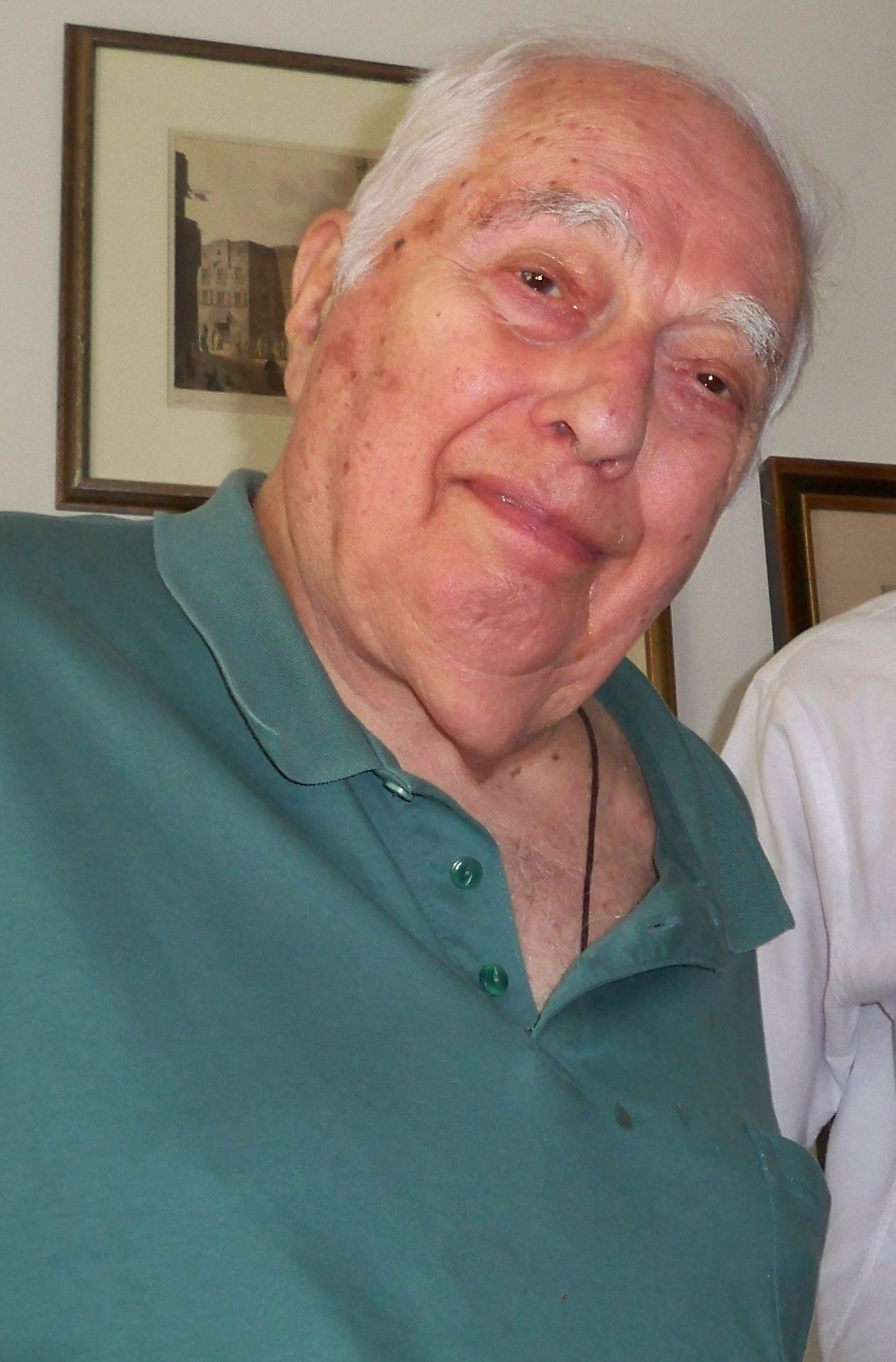
Bernard Lewis was one of the decline thesis' most famous proponents.

The most prominent writer on Ottoman decline was the historian Bernard Lewis, who argued that the Ottoman Empire experienced all-encompassing decline affecting government, society and civilization. He laid out his views in the 1958 article, "Some Reflections on the Decline of the Ottoman Empire", which developed into the mainstream opinion of Orientalist scholars of the mid-twentieth century. However, the article is now highly criticized and no longer considered accurate by modern historians. Lewis' views were as follows:

The first ten sultans of the Ottoman Empire (from Osman I to Suleiman the Magnificent) were of competent rulers, while those who came after Suleiman were without exception "incompetents, degenerates, and misfits," a result of the Kafes system of succession, whereby dynastic princes no longer gained experience in provincial government before ascending to the throne. Faulty leadership at the top led to decay in all branches of government: the bureaucracy ceased to function effectively, and the quality of their records worsened. The Ottoman military lost its strength and began to experience defeats on the battlefield. They ceased to keep up with the advances of European military science, and consequently suffered territorial losses. As the Ottoman state and society was geared towards constant expansion, their sudden failure to achieve new conquests left the empire unable to adapt to its new relationship with Europe.

Economically, the empire was undermined by the discovery of the New World and the subsequent shift in the economic balance between the Mediterranean and Atlantic Europe, as well as the voyages of discovery which brought Europeans to India, and led to a decline in the volume of trade passing through Ottoman ports. In addition, the Price Revolution led to the destabilization of Ottoman coinage and a severe fiscal crisis, which proved disastrous when paired with the rapidly rising costs of warfare. As the cavalry army of the Ottomans became obsolete, the Timar System of land tenure which had sustained it fell into obsolescence, while the corrupt bureaucracy was unable to replace it with a functional alternative. Instead, tax-farming was introduced, leading to corruption and oppression of the peasantry, and agricultural decline. Ottoman economic and military backwardness was extenuated by their closed-mindedness and unwillingness to adopt European innovations, as well as an increasing disdain for practical science. Ultimately, the Ottoman Empire "reverted to a medieval state, with a medieval mentality and a medieval economy – but with the added burden of a bureaucracy and a standing army which no medieval state had ever had to bear."

Significantly, explanations of Ottoman decline were not limited to the empire's geopolitical position among world empires or to its military strength. The decline thesis was rooted in the nineteenth- and early twentieth-century conception of distinct "civilizations" as units of historical analysis, and thus explained Ottoman weakness with reference not only to its geopolitics but also defined it in social, economic, cultural, and moral terms. This all-encompassing notion of the decline of Ottoman (and more widely, Islamic) civilization became the framework within which Ottoman history from the sixteenth century onward was understood.

== Criticism of the thesis ==
=== Conceptual issues ===
Dana Sajdi, in an article summarizing the critiques of the decline thesis written since the 1970s, identifies the following as the main points that scholars have demonstrated: "1. The changing nature and adaptability of Ottoman state and society; 2. indigenous or internal social, economic, and/or intellectual processes displaying signs of modernity prior to the advent of the West; 3. the comparability of Ottoman state and society with their counterparts in the world in the same period; and 4. a logic, or a framework, alternative to decline and the Eurocentrism implied therein, that takes into account the phenomena of the seventeenth to eighteenth centuries." The first two points pertain to the decline thesis' depiction of Ottoman state and society as being backward-looking, static, and essentially incapable of innovation prior to the 'impact of the West'; the third concerns the degree to which the Ottoman Empire was taken to be totally unique, operating according to its own rules and internal logic, rather than being integrated into a wider comparative framework of world history; while the fourth addresses the degree to which the decline thesis overlooked the local processes actually occurring in the Ottoman Empire during the seventeenth and eighteenth centuries, in favor of emphasis on the grand narrative of Ottoman decay and European superiority.

In line with these points, a common criticism of the decline thesis is that it is teleological: that is to say that it presents all of Ottoman history as the story of the rise and fall of the empire, causing earlier historians to over-emphasize the empire's troubles and under-emphasize its strengths. According to Linda Darling, "because we know that eventually the Ottomans became a weaker power and finally disappeared, every earlier difficulty they experienced becomes a "seed of decline," and Ottoman successes and sources of strength vanish from the record." The corollary of decline is the notion that the empire had earlier reached a peak, and this too has been problematized. The reign of Suleiman the Magnificent had been seen as a golden age to which all of the rest of the empire's history was to be compared. Such comparisons caused earlier researchers to see transformation and change as inherently negative, as the empire shifted away from the established norms of Suleiman's romanticized and idealized age. According to Jane Hathaway, this focus on the "golden age" had a distorting effect on its history: "a massive empire that lasted for over six centuries cannot have had an ideal moment and an ideal permutation by which the entire chronological and geographical span of the empire can be judged." Instead, modern scholars take change to be a natural result of the empire's adaptation to the world around it, a sign of innovativeness and flexibility rather than decline.

=== Political ===
In reexamining the notion of political decline in the Ottoman Empire, historians first examined the nasihatname texts which had formed the backbone of the decline thesis. Many scholars, among them most notably Douglas Howard and Rifa'at Ali Abou-El-Haj, pointed out that these Ottoman writers' critiques of contemporary society were not uninfluenced by their own biases, and criticized earlier historians for taking them at face value without any critical analysis. Furthermore, "complaint about the times" was in fact a literary trope in Ottoman society, and also existed during the period of the so-called "golden age" of Suleiman the Magnificent. For Ottoman writers, "decline" was a trope which allowed them to pass judgement on the contemporary state and society, rather than a description of objective reality. Thus, these works should not be taken as evidence of actual Ottoman decline.

Other tropes of political decline, such as the notion that the sultans ruling after the time of Suleiman I were less competent rulers, have also been challenged. The reigns of such figures as Ahmed I, Osman II, and Mehmed IV (among others) have been re-examined in the context of the conditions of their own respective eras, rather than by inappropriately comparing them with a mythical Suleimanic ideal. Indeed, the very notion of whether Suleiman's reign constituted a golden age in the first place has come into question. The fact that sultans no longer personally accompanied the army on military campaigns is no longer criticized, but seen as a positive and necessary change resulting from the empire's transformation into a sedentary imperial polity. Leslie Peirce's research on the political role of women in the Ottoman dynasty has demonstrated the inaccuracy of the assumption that the so-called Sultanate of Women, in which female members of the dynasty exercised an unusually high degree of power, was in some way either a cause or a symptom of imperial weakness. On the contrary, Ottoman Valide Sultans, princesses, and concubines were successfully able to fortify dynastic rule during periods of instability, and played an important role in dynastic legitimization. Furthermore, the importance of the rapidly expanding bureaucracy is now particularly emphasized as a source of stability and strength for the empire during the seventeenth and eighteenth centuries, drawing particularly upon the work of Linda Darling. Based largely on the work of Ariel Salzmann, the empowerment of regional notables in the eighteenth century has been reinterpreted as an effective form of government, rather than a sign of decline.

=== Military ===
One of the most enduring claims of the decline thesis was that of the weakness of the Ottoman military in the post-Suleimanic period. Supposedly, the once-feared Janissary Corps became corrupted as they increasingly earned privileges for themselves, gaining the right to marry, sire children, and enroll those children into the corps. Rather than maintaining strict military discipline, they began to take up professions as merchants and shopkeepers in order to supplement their income, thus losing their military edge. However, it is now understood that janissary participation in the economy was not limited to the post-Suleimanic period. Janissaries were engaging in commerce as early as the fifteenth century, without any apparent impact on their military discipline. Furthermore, far from becoming militarily ineffective, the Janissaries continued to remain one of the most innovative forces in Europe, introducing the tactic of volley fire alongside and perhaps even earlier than most European armies.

Even greater attention has been given to the changes experienced by the Timar System during this era. The breakdown of the Timar System is now seen not as a result of incompetent administration, but as a conscious policy meant to help the empire adapt to the increasingly monetized economy of the late sixteenth century. Thus, far from being a symptom of decline, this was part of a process of military and fiscal modernization. The army of cavalry which the Timar System had produced was becoming increasingly obsolete by the seventeenth century, and this transformation allowed the Ottomans to instead raise large armies of musket-wielding infantry, thereby maintaining their military competitiveness. By the 1690s, the proportion of infantry in the Ottoman army had increased to 50–60 percent, equivalent to their Habsburg rivals.

In terms of armament production and weapons technology, the Ottomans remained roughly equivalent with their European rivals throughout most of the seventeenth and eighteenth centuries. The theory that Ottoman cannon foundries neglected mobile field guns by producing oversized siege cannon at a disproportionate rate has been debunked by the military historian Gábor Ágoston. Despite the Orientalistic claim that an inherent conservatism in Islam prevented the Ottomans from adopting European military innovations, it is now known that the Ottomans were receptive to foreign techniques and inventions, and continued to employ European renegades and technical experts throughout the seventeenth and eighteenth centuries. In terms of productive capacity, the Ottomans were even able to surpass their European rivals during the seventeenth century. They maintained full self-sufficiency in gunpowder production until the late eighteenth century, and with rare and brief exceptions were continually able to produce enough cannon and muskets to supply their whole armed forces as well as surplus stockpiles. According to Gábor Ágoston and Rhoads Murphey, Ottoman defeats in the 1683–99 and 1768–74 wars with the Habsburgs and Russia are best explained by the strain on logistics and communications caused by multi-front warfare rather than Ottoman inferiority in technology and armaments, as such inferiority, insofar as it existed at all, was far less significant than had formerly been believed. It is now believed that the Ottoman military was able to maintain rough parity with its rivals until the 1760s, falling behind as a consequence of a long period of peace on its western front between 1740 and 1768, when the Ottomans missed out on the advances associated with the Seven Years' War.

=== Economic and fiscal ===
Early critiques of the decline thesis from an economic standpoint were heavily influenced by new sociological perspectives of dependency theory and world-systems analysis as articulated by scholars such as Andre Gunder Frank and Immanuel Wallerstein in the 1960s and 1970s. These theories provided an influential critique of the prevailing theory of modernization which was then popular among economists and political analysts, and had been the framework within which Ottoman economic history had been understood, exemplified above all by Bernard Lewis' 1961 The Emergence of Modern Turkey. Modernization theory held that the underdeveloped world was impoverished because its failure to follow Europe in advancing along a series of distinct stages of development (based on the model provided above all by France and Britain), which were assumed to be uniformly applicable to all societies. Historians seeking to identify the factors which prevented the Ottomans from achieving "modernization" turned to the stereotypes which formed the basis of the decline thesis: an Ottoman penchant for despotism and lethargy which inhibited their entry into the modern world and brought about economic stagnation. Dependency theory, in contrast, viewed modern-day underdevelopment as the product of the unequal global economic system gradually established by Europeans beginning in the early modern period, and thus saw it as the outcome of a historical process rather than a simple inability to adapt on the part of the non-Western world. Dependency theory, introduced into Ottoman history by Huri İslamoğlu-İnan and Çağlar Keyder, thus allowed historians to move beyond the concepts which had previously dominated Ottoman economic history, above all the notion of an "Oriental despotism" (Note: "Oriental despotism" was a term deployed in Marxist historical analyses. It was postulated on a vision of Middle Eastern state and society as one in which all power was concentrated in the hands of an absolute ruler, who by controlling all of the land in the empire, prevented the independent emergence of a native bourgeoisie, and thus made capitalism impossible. This concept, or others like it, long served as a foundational principle in the study of the economic history of the Ottoman Empire and of Asian societies more generally, though it was, as noted by Zachary Lockman, "in reality based on crude generalizations and a very faulty understanding of their [Asian societies'] (quite diverse) histories and social structures.) which supposedly inhibited economic development, and instead to examine the empire in terms of its gradual integration into the periphery of a newly emerging Europe-centered world system. Subsequent provincial studies highlighted the degree to which the eighteenth- and early nineteenth-century Ottoman Empire was undergoing its own capitalist transformation independent of European economic penetration, which in turn facilitated the empire's integration into the world economy. Even following the empire's peripheralization, Ottoman manufacturing, long assumed to have collapsed in the face of European competition, is now understood to have grown and even flourished during the eighteenth and nineteenth centuries, benefiting from the strength of the Ottoman domestic market.

In earlier periods, Ottoman economic and fiscal downturn was associated above all with the catastrophic effects of the price revolution of the late sixteenth century. However, this economic downturn was not unique to the Ottomans, but was shared by European states as all struggled with the diverse pressures of inflation, demographic shifts, and the escalating costs of warfare. By placing the Ottomans in comparative context with their neighbors, scholars have demonstrated that the multiple crises experienced by the Ottomans in the late sixteenth and early-to-mid seventeenth centuries can be seen as part of a wider European context characterized as the 'general crisis of the seventeenth century', rather than a sign of uniquely Ottoman decline. The assumption that the Ottoman economy was unable to recover from these crises was rooted both in the poor state of the field's knowledge of the Ottoman economy in the later seventeenth and eighteenth centuries, and also in how easily it seemed to fit with pre-existing ideas about Ottoman decline. However, subsequent research demonstrated that, in the words of Şevket Pamuk, the eighteenth century "was in fact a period of recovery for the Ottoman monetary system," indicating that "the old thesis of continuous decline cannot be sustained." Far from declining, the first half of the eighteenth century was a period of significant expansion and growth for the Ottoman economy.

Other supposed manifestations of Ottoman economic decline have also been challenged. The establishment by European merchants of new maritime trade routes to India around the Cape of Good Hope, bypassing Ottoman territories, had a far less significant impact on the Ottoman economy than had once been assumed. While earlier scholarship depicted the Portuguese as having established a near-monopoly on the movement of luxury goods, particularly spices, to Europe, in fact the Portuguese were only one of many actors competing in the Indian Ocean commercial arena. Even in the late sixteenth century, Asian merchants utilizing the traditional Red Sea trade routes through Ottoman territory transported four times as many spices as those of Portuguese merchants, and until the early eighteenth century more silver specie continued to be imported into India via the traditional Middle Eastern routes than through the European-dominated Cape route. The loss of revenue which did occur was made up for by the rise in the coffee trade from Yemen during the seventeenth century which, along with strong commercial ties with India, ensured the continued prosperity of Red Sea trade and of Cairo as a commercial center.

Historians such as the above-mentioned Bernard Lewis once referred to the supposed fall in the quality of the empire's bureaucratic records as an indication of stagnation in the Ottoman administrative apparatus. Historians now recognize that no such decline ever occurred. This change in record-keeping was attributable not to loss in quality, but to a change in the nature of land assessment, as the empire adjusted to the increasingly monetized economy characteristic of the seventeenth century. The assessment methods in use under Sultan Suleiman were well-suited to ensuring proper distribution of revenues to the army of feudal cavalry that then made up the bulk of Ottoman forces. However, by the turn of the century, the need for cash to raise armies of musket-wielding infantry led the central government to reform its system of land tenure, and to expand the practice of tax farming, which was also a common method of revenue-raising in contemporary Europe. In fact, the seventeenth century was a period of significant expansion in the Ottoman bureaucracy, not contraction or decline. These changes, contrary to the claims of earlier historians, do not seem to have led to widespread corruption or oppression to a degree greater than that observable among the Ottoman Empire's European contemporaries. The Ottomans, like other European states, struggled throughout the seventeenth century to meet rapidly rising expenses, but by its end were able to institute reforms which allowed them to enter the eighteenth century with a budget surplus. In the words of Linda Darling, "Ascribing seventeenth-century Ottoman budgetary deficits to the decline of the empire leaves unexplained the cessation of these deficits in the eighteenth century."

== 21st-century scholarly consensus ==
Having dispensed with the notion of decline, today's historians of the Ottoman Empire most commonly refer to the post-Suleimanic Period, or more widely the period from 1550 to 1700, as one of transformation. The role of economic and political crises in defining this period is crucial, but so too is their temporary nature, as the Ottoman state was ultimately able to survive and adapt to a changing world. Also of increasing emphasis is the place of the Ottoman Empire in comparative perspective, particularly with the states of Europe. While the Ottomans struggled with a severe economic and fiscal downturn, so too did their European contemporaries. This period is frequently referred to as that of The General Crisis of the Seventeenth Century, and thus the difficulties faced by the Ottoman Empire have been reframed not as unique to them, but as part of a general trend impacting the entire European and Mediterranean region. In the words of Ehud Toledano, "In both Europe and the Ottoman empire, these changes transformed states and the ways in which military-administrative elites waged and funded wars. Coping with these enormous challenges and finding the appropriate responses through a sea of socio-economic and political changes is, in fact, the story of seventeenth- and eighteenth-century Ottoman history. A remarkable adaptation to new realities, rather than decline and disintegration, was its main feature; it reflects the resourcefulness, pragmatism and flexibility in thought and action of the Ottoman military-administrative elite, rather than their ineptitude or incompetence. Thus, per Dana Sajdi: "Regardless of what one may think of an individual revisionist work, or a particular method or framework, the cumulative effect of the scholarship has demonstrated the empirical and theoretical invalidity of the decline thesis, and offered a portrayal of an internally dynamic Ottoman state and society. It has also established the comparability of the Ottoman empire to other - mainly European - societies and polities, and concomitantly revised the existing scheme of periodization." The 21st-century scholarly consensus on the post-Suleimanic period can thus be summarized as follows:

Historians of the Ottoman Empire have rejected the narrative of decline in favor of one of crisis and adaptation: after weathering a wretched economic and demographic crisis in the late sixteenth and early seventeenth centuries, the Ottoman Empire adjusted its character from that of a military conquest state to that of a territorially more stable, bureaucratic state whose chief concern was no longer conquering new territories but extracting revenue from the territories it already controlled while shoring up its image as the bastion of Sunni Islam.

— Jane Hathaway, with contributions by Karl K. Barbir, The Arab Lands Under Ottoman Rule, 1516–1800, (Pearson Education Limited, 2008), pp. 8–9.

== See also ==
- Ghaza Thesis

== Bibliography ==
- Abou-El-Haj, Rifa'at A. Formation of the Modern State: The Ottoman Empire, Sixteenth to Eighteenth Centuries. 2nd ed. Syracuse: Syracuse University Press, 2005.
- Abou-El-Haj, Rifa'at A. "The Ottoman Vezir and Paşa Households 1683–1703, A Preliminary Report." Journal of the American Oriental Society 94 (1974): 438–447.
- Ágoston, Gábor. "Firearms and Military Adaptation: The Ottomans and the European Military Revolution, 1450–1800". Journal of World History.' 25 (2014): 85–124.
- Ágoston, Gábor. Guns for the Sultan: Military Power and the Weapons Industry in the Ottoman Empire. Cambridge: Cambridge University Press, 2005.
- Ágoston, Gábor. "Ottoman Artillery and European Military Technology in the Fifteenth and Seventeenth Centuries." Acta Orientalia Academiae Scientiarum Hungaricae 47/1–2 (1994): 15–48.
- Aksan, Virginia and Daniel Goffman eds. The Early Modern Ottomans: Remapping the Empire. Cambridge: Cambridge University Press, 2007.
- Aksan, Virginia. "Ottoman to Turk: Continuity and Change." International Journal 61 (Winter 2005/6): 19–38.
- Aksan, Virginia (2007). Ottoman Wars, 1700–1860: An Empire Besieged. Pearson Education Ltd. pp. 130–5. ISBN 978-0-582-30807-7.
- Aksan, Virginia. "Theoretical Ottomans." History and Theory 47 (2008): 109–122.
- Baer, Marc. Honored by the Glory of Islam: Conversion and Conquest in Ottoman Europe. New York: Oxford University Press, 2008.
- Barkey, Karen. Bandits and Bureaucrats: The Ottoman Route to State Centralization. Cornell University Press, 1994.
- Börekçi, Günhan. "A Contribution to the Military Revolution Debate: The Janissaries’ Use of Volley Fire During the Long Ottoman-Habsburg War of 1593–1606 and the Problem of Origins." Acta Orientalia Academiae Scientiarum Hungaricae 59 (2006): 407–438.
- Börekçi, Günhan. "Factions and Favorites at the Courts of Sultan Ahmed I (r. 1603–17) and His Immediate Predecessors." PhD dissertation. The Ohio State University, 2010.
- Çalışır, M. Fatih. "Decline of a 'Myth': Perspectives on the Ottoman 'Decline'," The History School 9 (2011): 37–60.
- Casale, Giancarlo, The Ottoman Age of Exploration. Oxford University Press, 2010.
- Darling, Linda. Revenue Raising and Legitimacy: Tax Collection and Finance Administration in the Ottoman Empire, 1560–1660. Leiden: E.J. Brill, 1996.
- Faroqhi, Suraiya. Approaching Ottoman History: An Introduction to the Sources. Cambridge: Cambridge University Press, 1999.
- Faroqhi, Suraiya, eds. The Later Ottoman Empire, 1603–1839, volume 3 of The Cambridge History of Turkey. Cambridge: Cambridge University Press, 2006.
- Faroqhi, Suraiya. "Crisis and Change, 1590–1699." In An Economic and Social History of the Ottoman Empire, 1300–1914, 411–636. Edited by Halil İnalcık with Donald Quataert. Cambridge: Cambridge University Press, 1994.
- Faroqhi, Suraiya. The Ottoman Empire and the World Around It. I. B. Tauris, 2004; 2011.
- Findley, Carter Vaughn. "Political culture and the great households", in Suraiya Faroqhi eds., The Later Ottoman Empire, 1603–1839 (2006).
- Finkel, Caroline (1988). The Administration of Warfare: The Ottoman Military Campaigns in Hungary, 1593–1606. Vienna: VWGÖ. ISBN 3-85369-708-9.
- Fleischer, Cornell. Bureaucrat and Intellectual in the Ottoman Empire: The Historian Mustafa Âli, 1541–1600. Princeton: Princeton University Press, 1986.
- Fodor, Pál. "State and Society, Crisis and Reform, in a 15th–17th Century Ottoman Mirror for Princes." Acta Orientalia Academiae Scientiarum Hungaricae 40 (1986): 217–240.
- Gibb, H.A.R. and Harold Bowen. Islamic Society and the West: A Study of the Impact of Western Civilization on Modern Culture in the Near East. Oxford: Oxford University Press, 1950, 1957.
- Grant, Jonathan. "Rethinking the Ottoman 'Decline': Military Technology Diffusion in the Ottoman Empire, Fifteenth to Eighteenth Centuries." Journal of World History 10 (1999): 179–201.
- Hammer-Purgstall, Joseph von. Geschichte des Osmanisches Reiches. (in German) 10 vols. Budapest: Ca. H. Hartleben, 1827–35.
- Hathaway, Jane. The Arab Lands under Ottoman Rule, 1516–1800, with contributions by Karl K. Barbir. Pearson Education Limited, 2008.
- Hathaway, Jane. "The Ottomans and the Yemeni Coffee Trade." Oriente Moderno 25 (2006): 161–171.
- Hathaway, Jane. The Politics of Households in Ottoman Egypt: The Rise of the Qazdağlıs. Cambridge University Press, 1997.
- Hathaway, Jane. "Problems of Periodization in Ottoman History: The Fifteenth through the Eighteenth Centuries". The Turkish Studies Association Bulletin 20 (1996): 25–31.
- Howard, Douglas. "Genre and Myth in the Ottoman Advice for Kings Literature." In The Early Modern Ottomans: Remapping the Empire. Edited by Virginia Aksan and Daniel Goffman. Cambridge: Cambridge University Press, 2007.
- Howard, Douglas. "Ottoman Historiography and the Literature of 'Decline' of the Sixteenth and Seventeenth Century." Journal of Asian History 22 (1988): 52–77.
- İnalcık, Halil ed., with Donald Quataert. An Economic and Social History of the Ottoman Empire, 1300–1914. Cambridge: Cambridge University Press, 1994.
- İnalcık, Halil. "Military and Fiscal Transformation in the Ottoman Empire, 1600–1700." Archivum Ottomanicum 6 (1980): 283–337.
- İnalcık, Halil and Cemal Kafadar eds., Süleyman the Second [sic] and His Time. Istanbul: ISIS Press, 1993.
- Kafadar, Cemal. "The Myth of the Golden Age: Ottoman Historical Consciousness in the post-Süleymanic Era." 37–48. In Süleyman the Second [sic] and His Time. Edited by Halil İnalcık and Cemal Kafadar. Istanbul: ISIS Press, 1993.
- Kafadar, Cemal. "On the Purity and Corruption of the Janissaries," Turkish Studies Association Bulletin 15 (1991): 273–280.
- Karateke, Hakan T. "On the Tranquility and Repose of the Sultan," In The Ottoman World, 116–129. Edited by Christine Woodhead. Routledge, 2011.
- Kunt, Metin. "Introduction to Part I," in Süleyman the Magnificent and His Age: the Ottoman Empire in the Early Modern World. Edited by Metin Kunt and Christine Woodhead. London and New York: Longman, 1995.
- Kunt, Metin. "Royal and Other Households," in The Ottoman World. Edited by Christine Woodhead. Routledge, 2011.
- Kunt, Metin. The Sultan's Servants: The Transformation of Ottoman Provincial Government, 1550–1650. The Modern Middle East Series, 14. New York: Columbia University Press, 1983.
- Lewis, Bernard. "Some Reflections on the Decline of the Ottoman Empire." Studia Islamica 1 (1958): 111–127.
- Masters, Bruce. The Origins of Western Economic Dominance in the Middle East: Mercantilism and the Islamic Economy in Aleppo, 1600–1750. New York and London: New York University Press, 1988.
- Murphey, Rhoads. Ottoman Warfare: 1500–1700. New Brunswick: Rutgers University Press, 1999.
- Murphey, Rhoads. "The Veliyüddin Telhis: Notes on the Sources and Interrelations between Koçu Bey and Contemporary Writers of Advice to Kings." Belleten 43 (1979): 547–571.
- Pamuk, Şevket. A Monetary History of the Ottoman Empire. Cambridge: Cambridge University Press, 2000.
- Parker, Geoffrey. Global Crisis: War, Climate Change & Catastrophe in the Seventeenth Century. New Haven: Yale University Press, 2013.
- Peirce, Leslie. "Changing Perceptions of the Ottoman Empire: the Early Centuries." Mediterranean Historical Review 19/1 (2004): 6–28.
- Peirce, Leslie. The Imperial Harem: Women and Sovereignty in the Ottoman Empire. Oxford University Press: 1993.
- Quataert, Donald. "Ottoman History Writing and Changing Attitudes towards the Notion of 'Decline,'" History Compass 1 (2003)
- Şahin, Kaya. Empire and Power in the Reign of Süleyman: Narrating the Sixteenth-Century Ottoman World. Cambridge: Cambridge University Press, 2013.
- Said, Edward. Orientalism. New York: Pantheon, 1978.
- Salzmann, Ariel. "The Old Regime and the Ottoman Middle East." In The Ottoman World, 409–422. Edited by Christine Woodhead. Routledge, 2011.
- Salzmann, Ariel (1993). "An Ancien Régime Revisited: "Privatization" and Political Economy in the Eighteenth-Century Ottoman Empire". Politics & Society. 21 (4): 393–423. doi:10.1177/0032329293021004003. S2CID 153936362.
- Tezcan, Baki. The Second Ottoman Empire: Political and Social Transformation in the Early Modern World. Cambridge University Press, 2010.
- Ehud Toledano (2011). "The Arabic-speaking world in the Ottoman period: A socio-political analysis". In Woodhead, Christine (ed.). The Ottoman World. Routledge. pp. 453–66. ISBN 978-0-415-44492-7.
- Ursinus, Michael. "The Transformation of the Ottoman Fiscal Regime, c. 1600–1850." In The Ottoman World, 423–435. Edited by Christine Woodhead. Routledge, 2011.
- Woodhead, Christine eds. The Ottoman World. Routledge, 2011.
- Woodhead, Christine (2008). "New Views on Ottoman History, 1453–1839". The English Historical Review. 123. Oxford University Press: 973–987. doi:10.1093/ehr/cen174.
