= Insha =

The Arabic word insha (Arabic: إنشاء, romanized: inshā’) means "construction", or "creation". It has been used in this sense in classical Arabic literature such as the Quran. Over time it acquired the meaning of composition, especially denoting the prose composition of letters, documents, and state papers. Subsequently, it was used as a synonym of 'Munshaat', which are documents composed in accordance with specific norms of diction and style that distinguish these prose compositions from ordinary prose. Gradually the term "Insha " came to represent a distinct branch of learning that enabled one to discern the merits and defects of the prose composition of letters and documents as a distinct type of writing from regular treatises and books.

"Insha" writing is mainly concerned with the expression of one's innermost feelings, rather than the use of prose in scientific treatises. Insha writing developed into an art form and involved detailed rules and regulations that a well lettered person was supposed to learn, and artful and well written epistolography, was considered a form of Adab. The devices employed in Insha include verbal puns, and tricks, riddles, and a mannered, elegant style of writing. A model of stately Insha prose in Arabic was provided by al-Qadi al-Fadil, (d.1199), and later by al-Qalqashandi (d.1418). In the classical Persian literature, the most representative type of "Insha is identified as "Rasail", meaning "letters".

Generally "Rasail" literature can be categorized into two types of literature- a.) Tauqi'at and b.) muhawarat. Tauqi'at consists of the orders and directives of rulers and officials, and Muhawarat consists of letters and correspondence. If the addressee is superior in status then the form of letters are called Murafa'a, and in case the addressee is inferior in status, then the type of letters are called ruq'a. If both the addressee and the writer are of equal status, then the type of letters are called murasala.

The Insha is a broad category of formal epistolary writing, with includes many subcategories with their own stylistic norms depending on the letter's contents, audience, and intent. Among the many genres of formal letter-writing, some of the most well-known include official proclamations, which take the literary form of a letter from a ruler addressed to his subjects -- for example, firman (decree), ahidnâme (charter), fathnama ("proclamation of victory" - a public announcement of victory in war), depending on the nature of its contents.

Another example an Insha genre is the fatwa -- that is, a scholarly ruling on a matter of Islamic law, issued by a qualified jurist, in response to some specific question, issue, or case. The word fatwa literally means something like clarification or explanation, and fatwas as a genre explain the author's interpretation of the issue at hand, its relation to the relevant sources of Islamic law, and the reasoning which led the author to their ruling. They frequently take the form of an open letter, and are written in an epistolary style because, as the fatwa is a legal opinion, its legitimacy and validity depend on the authority of its issuer.

Islamic advice literature has its own genres of insha, including its own traditions of mirrors for princes. An example is the nasîhatname -- a pedagogical collection of letters meant to advise princes on matters of government and rulership, as well as cultivate good values, conduct, manners, and virtues. An especially influential nasîhatname was Nizam al-Mulk's Siyāsatnāme (Book of Politics), during his tutelage of Malik-Shah of the Great Seljuk Empire. They often incorporate fictional stories, history, and religious narratives as didactic tools. As a genre, the nasîhatname is stylistically-influenced by Islamic non-epistolary hidayah literature, as well as non-Islamic mirrors for princes (including the works of Aristotle, the Byzantine chronographia genre, and the Persian andarz genre).

The Insha is of im. Many intellectuals such as Amir Khusrow, Mahmud Gawan, and Abu'l-Fazl set a model of Insha writing, which was followed by generations of Insha writers. In admiration of superb Insha writing, many collections of Insha writing were collected. Munshaat -i- Namakin is one of the largest collections of Insha writings, which is dated from the early Mughal period.

== Sources ==
- Roemer, H. R. (1971). "Ins̲h̲āʾ". In Lewis, B.; Ménage, V. L.; Pellat, Ch. & Schacht, J. (eds.). The Encyclopaedia of Islam, Second Edition. Volume III: H–Iram. Leiden: E. J. Brill. pp. 1241–1244. doi:10.1163/1573-3912_islam_SIM_3577. OCLC 495469525.
