= Samuele Romanin =

Italian historian (1808–1861)

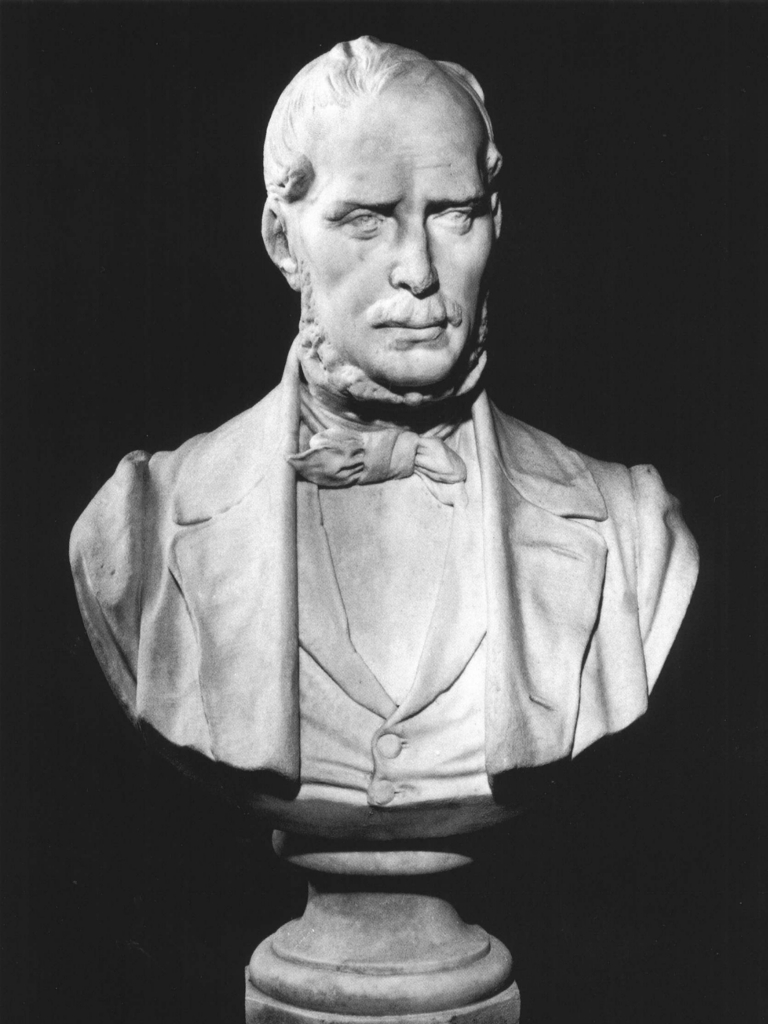

Samuele Romanin (1808 – September 9, 1861) was an Italian historian, educator and writer.

== Biography ==
He was born of a poor Jewish family in Trieste. Being left an orphan at an early age, he provided for his younger brothers and sister by giving French and German lessons.

In 1821 he settled in Venice, where he afterwards translated Hammer-Purgstall's Die Geschichte der Assassinen aus morgenländischen Quellen and Geschichte des osmanischen Reiches into Italian. He next published his own Storia dei Popoli Europei alla Decadenza dell'Impero Romano (1842–1844).

He taught in a private school and was sworn interpreter in German to the courts of justice; on the expulsion of the Austrians in 1848 he was appointed professor of history by the provisional government, and he lectured on Venetian history at the Ateneo Veneto.

In 1852 he began to publish his monumental Storia documentata di Venezia, but although he finished the work, carrying it down to the fall of the Venetian Republic in 1798, he did not live to see the publication completed, as he died of apoplexy in September 1861; among his papers were found all the documents which were to be added, and the index. The tenth and last volume was issued in 1861.

After Romanin's death his lectures on Venetian history were published in two volumes in 1875. Among his other works were: Gli Inquisitori di Stato di Venezia (1858), Bajamonte Tiepolo e le sue ultime vicende (1851), and Venezia nel 1789 (1860).
