= Historiography of the Ottoman Empire =

The historiography of the Ottoman Empire refers to the studies, sources, critical methods and interpretations used by scholars to develop a history of the Ottoman Dynasty's empire.

Scholars have long studied the Empire, looking at the causes for its formation (such as the Ghaza thesis), its relations to the Great Powers (such as Sick man of Europe) and other empires (such as Transformation of the Ottoman Empire), and the kinds of people who became imperialists or anti-imperialists (such as the Young Turks), together with their mindsets. The history of the breakdown of the Empire (such as Ottoman decline thesis) has attracted scholars of the histories of the Middle East (such as Partition of the Ottoman Empire), and Greece (Rise of nationalism in the Ottoman Empire).

== Formulable theses ==
=== Those about the emergence of the Ottoman Empire ===
1. Ghaza thesis — it is formulated first, but it is the most criticized and politicized. The thesis most clearly advocates the ethnic pan-Turkic principle. It was developed by Paul Wittek;
2. Renegade thesis — represented in studies, articles and books by various authors. It is based on numerous eyewitness accounts. It is supplemented by the hypothesis of the geographical and to some extent civilizational succession of the Ottoman Empire (Rûm) by the Eastern Roman Empire;
3. Marxist models. Early Marxist interpretations, influenced by Marx and Engels' own writings, often characterized the Ottoman Empire (along with other "Oriental" societies) as operating under an "Asiatic mode of production" and "Oriental Despotism".
4. Socio-economic thesis — the newest and most modern, sustained in the traditions of Marxist historiography. The thesis is found in various articles and studies. It is based on the aftermath of the Black Death and the legacy of the Byzantine civil wars.

=== Those about the decline of the Ottoman Empire ===
1. Classic thesis — as a result of the Russo-Turkish War (1768–1774) with the subsequent Treaty of Küçük Kaynarca. Previously marked by the beginning of the reign of Catherine the Great, the writing of "Istoriya Slavyanobolgarskaya" and the death of Koca Ragıp Pasha;
2. Ottoman decline thesis — now-controversial thesis clearly formulated for the first time in 1958 by Bernard Lewis. Aligns with Koçi Bey's risalets, but arguably ignores the Köprülü era and its reform of the Ottoman state, economy and navy heading into the 18th century;
3. Neoclassical thesis — to some extent it unites the previous ones about the beginning of the Ottoman decline, which are divided even nearly two centuries in time. The beginning of the end was marked by the Treaty of Karlowitz, the Edirne event and the reign of Ahmed III.

=== Archival sources ===
Ottoman history has been rewritten for political and cultural advantage and speculative theories rife with inconsistent research, ahistorical assumptions and embedded biases. Partly because the archives are moderately new. The Ottoman Archives are a collection of historical sources related to the Ottoman Empire and a total of 39 nations whose territories one time or the other were part of this Empire, including 19 nations in the Middle East, 11 in the EU and Balkans, three in the Caucasus, two in Central Asia, Cyprus, as well as Palestine and the Republic of Turkey. Ottoman Bank Archives and Research Centre operated in the former Head Office of the Ottoman Bank.

== Establishment of the Empire ==
Osman's Dream is a mythological story relating to the life of Osman I, founder of the Ottoman Empire. The story describes a dream experienced by Osman while staying in the home of a religious figure, Sheikh Edebali, in which he sees a metaphorical vision predicting the growth and prosperity of an empire to be ruled by him and his descendants. However there are other thesis addresses the question of how the Ottomans were able to expand from a small principality on the frontier of the Byzantine Empire into a centralized, intercontinental empire. According to the Ghaza thesis, the Ottomans accomplished this by attracting recruits to fight for them in the name of Islamic holy war against the non-believers. Such a warrior was known in Turkish as a ghazi, and thus this thesis sees the early Ottoman state as a "Ghazi State," defined by an ideology of holy war. The Ghaza Thesis dominated early Ottoman historiography throughout much of the twentieth century before coming under increasing criticism beginning in the 1980s. Historians now generally reject the Ghaza Thesis, and consequently the idea that Ottoman expansion was primarily fueled by holy war, but are conflicted with regard to what to replace it with.

== Effect of nationalism ==
In seeking new identities and ideological foundations for their states, Arabs and Turks invoked ancient history: the Pharaohs, Kings of Babylon, and the Hittites of pre-Ottoman Anatolia. This could involve hostility and often vilification, not so much regarding specific Ottoman policies but more about state building processes. Doumani’s study of the Arab region of Ottoman Palestine notes: "most Arab nationalists view the entire Ottoman era as a period of oppressive Turkish rule which stifled Arab culture and socioeconomic development and paved the way for European colonial control and the Zionist takeover of Palestine." The 19th- and early 20th-century literature written by Westerners bent on "discovering" the Holy Land—that is, reclaiming it from what they believed was a stagnant and declining Ottoman Empire—provided the intellectual foundation for this shared image.

== Ottoman Industrial Revolution ==
Regarding the Ottoman Industrial Revolution, Edward Clark said, "Ottoman responses to this European economic challenge are relatively unknown, and even the extensive and costly Ottoman industrial efforts of the 1840s seemingly have been dismissed as the casual, if not comical games of disinterested bureaucrats... What were the nature and magnitude of these Ottoman responses? What were Ottoman objectives? What main factors contributed to their failures? What if any achievements resulted?"

== Collapse of the Empire ==
Many twentieth-century scholars argued that power of the Ottoman Empire began waning after the death of Suleiman the Magnificent in 1566, and without the acquisition of significant new wealth the empire went into decline, a concept known as the Ottoman Decline Thesis. Since the late 1970s, however, historians increasingly came to question the idea of Ottoman decline, and now there is a consensus among academic historians that the Ottoman Empire did not decline.

== See also ==
- History of Turkey
- Abolition of the Ottoman Sultanate

== Bibliography ==
=== Books and chapters ===
- Faroqhi, Suraiya (1999). Approaching Ottoman History: an Introduction to the Sources. Cambridge University Press. ISBN 978-0-521-66648-0.
- Issawi, C. (1966). The Economic History of the Middle East, 1800–1914: a Book of Readings. London: University of Chicago Press.
- İnalcik, Halil (1994). 1300–1600. An Economic and Social History of the Ottoman Empire. Vol. 1.
- Itzkowitz, N. (1980). Ottoman Empire and Islamic Tradition. London: University of Chicago Press. ISBN 9780226388069.
- İslamoğlu-İnan, Huri (2004). "State and peasants in the Ottoman Empire: a study of peasant economy in north-central Anatolia during the sixteenth century". In Huri İslamoğlu-İnan (ed.). The Ottoman Empire and the World-Economy. Studies in Modern Capitalism. Vol. 12. Cambridge University Press. pp. 101–159. ISBN 978-0-521-52607-4.
- McNeil, W (1964). Europe's Steppe Frontier 1500-1800. London: University of Chicago Press.
- Pamuk, Şevket (1987). The Ottoman Empire and European Capitalism, 1820-1913. Cambridge: Cambridge University Press.
- Quataert, Donald (2000). The Ottoman Empire, 1700–1922. Cambridge: Cambridge University Press. ISBN 978-0-521-63328-4.
- Quataert, Donald (2004). "A provisional report concerning the impact of European capital on Ottoman port workers, 1880–1909". In Huri İslamoğlu-İnan (ed.). The Ottoman Empire and the World-Economy. Studies in Modern Capitalism. Vol. 12. Cambridge University Press. pp. 300–310. ISBN 978-0-521-52607-4.
- Toledano, E. R. (1997). "The emergence of Ottoman–local elites in the Middle East and North Africa, 17th–19th centuries". In I. Poppe & M. Ma'oz (ed.). Essays in Honour of Albert Hourani. Oxford & London: St Antony's College and Tauris Press.
- Topal, Alp Eren. "Ottomanism in history and historiography: fortunes of a concept." in Narrated Empires: Perceptions of Late Habsburg and Ottoman Multinationalism (2021): 77-98. online

=== Journal articles ===
- Aksan, Virginia H. (March 2003). "Review: Finding the Way Back to the Ottoman Empire". The International History Review. 25 (1): 96–107. doi:10.1080/07075332.2003.9640991. JSTOR 40110278. S2CID 159466760. - Multiple book reviews
- Clay, Christopher (2001). "A monetary history of the Ottoman Empire". The Economic History Review. 54 (1).
- Clay, Christopher (1994). "The origins of modern banking in the Levant: the branch network of the Imperial Ottoman Bank, 1890–1914". International Journal of Middle East Studies. 26 (4): 589–614. doi:10.1017/s0020743800061122. JSTOR 163804. S2CID 162130850.
- Critz, José Morilla; Olmstead, Alan L.; Rhode, Paul W. (1999). ""Horn of Plenty": the globalization of Mediterranean horticulture and the economic development of southern Europe, 1880–1930". The Journal of Economic History. 59 (2): 316–352. doi:10.1017/s0022050700022853. JSTOR 2566554. PMID 21987866. S2CID 44972078.
- Eldem, Edhem. "Greece and the Greeks in Ottoman history and Turkish historiography." The Historical Review/La Revue Historique 6 (2009): 27-40. online
- Emrence, Cem. "Three waves of late Ottoman historiography, 1950-2007." Review of Middle East Studies 41.2 (2007): 137-151.
- Frangakis-Syrett, E. (1994). "Manufacturing and technology transfer in the Ottoman Empire, 1800–1914". International Journal of Middle East Studies.
- Hathaway, Jane. "Rewriting eighteenth-century Ottoman history." Mediterranean Historical Review 19.1 (2004): 29-53.
- Özmucur, Süleyman; Pamuk, Şevket (2005). "Real wages and the standards of living in the Ottoman Empire 1489–1914". International Journal of Middle East Studies. 37 (4): 293–321. doi:10.1017/S0022050702000517. JSTOR 2698182.
- Quataert, Donald (1975). "Dilemma of development: the Agricultural Bank and agricultural reform in Ottoman Turkey, 1888–1908". International Journal of Middle East Studies. 6 (2): 210–227. doi:10.1017/s002074380002451x. JSTOR 162420. S2CID 163638216.
- Raccagni, Michelle (1980). "The French economic interests in the Ottoman Empire". International Journal of Middle East Studies. 11 (3): 339–376. doi:10.1017/s0020743800054672. JSTOR 162665. S2CID 162224837.
- Shaw, Stanford J. (1978). "The Ottoman census system and population, 1831–1914". International Journal of Middle East Studies. 9 (3): 325–338. doi:10.1017/s0020743800033602. JSTOR 162768. S2CID 161326705.
- Wilson, R (2003). "A monetary history of the Ottoman Empire". Business History Review. 77 (2).
