= Epistolography =

Art of writing letters

Epistolography, or the art of writing letters, is a genre of Byzantine literature similar to rhetoric that was popular with the intellectual elite of the Byzantine age.

The letter became a popular literary form in the fourth century AD and combined Christian and classical Greek traditions. The collections of Julian, Libanios, and Synesius, and the work of the Cappadocian Fathers were particularly notable, while letters of Aristotle, Plato and the Pauline Epistles of the New Testament were influential in the development of the genre.

In some cases, large numbers of letters have survived from the more prolific practitioners. Nine hundred from Quintus Aurelius Symmachus (345–402) survive, and Libanius (c. 314–392 or 393) left over 1500 letters in Greek. Scholars have sometimes been disappointed with the content of the letters, which have tended to include rhetorical conventions to the exclusion of factual matters, or, in the case of Libanius, to include many generic recommendations on behalf of applicants to the Roman bureaucracy. A.H.M. Jones described the writing of letters in the later Roman Empire as a social convention of elegant compositions which contained no information and solicited none.

The genre later died out before being revived in the 11th and 12th centuries.

== See also ==
- Epistle
- Epistolary novel
- Insha (literature)
- Letter collection
