= Alan Mikhail =

American historian

Alan Mikhail (born 1979) is an Egyptian-American historian who is a professor of history at Yale University. His work centers on the history of the Ottoman Empire.

Mikhail's parents are Egyptian immigrants, who came to the US in the 1970s. He credited being closely connected to Egypt during his upbringing as a motivation for taking a class on the history of the modern Arab world, that shifted his career from an interest in hard sciences to an interest in history.

== Education ==
Mikhail graduated in History and Chemistry from Rice University in 2001, and received his MA in history from the University of California, Berkeley in 2003. His PhD was conferred from the same university in 2008. His thesis The Nature of Ottoman Egypt: Irrigation, Environment, and Bureaucracy in the Long Eighteenth Century was awarded the Malcolm H. Kerr Dissertation Award in the Social Sciences (2009) by Middle East Studies Association of North America (MESA).

== Career ==
He served as a postdoctoral scholar at Stanford University for two years, before becoming an assistant professor of history at Yale University in 2010. In 2013, he was promoted to full professor and became department chair in 2018.

== Works and Reception ==
=== Nature and Empire in Ottoman Egypt ===
His first monograph, Nature and Empire in Ottoman Egypt (2011), was a part of the Cambridge University Press series Studies in Environment and History. Based on his doctoral dissertation, the book argues for using an environmental lens to understand relations between the Ottoman Empire and the province of Egypt. It received a positive reception and won the Roger Owen Book Award from MESA for the best book in two years in economics, economic history, or the political economy of the Middle East and North Africa.

=== Water on Sand: Environmental Histories of the Middle East and North Africa ===
Water on Sand, published by Oxford University Press in 2013, was met with positive reviews.

=== The Animal in Ottoman Egypt ===
The Animal in Ottoman Egypt, published in 2014 by Oxford University Press, examines Egypt's changing place in the Ottoman Empire and world economy from the sixteenth to the nineteenth centuries through human-animal relations. Scholarly reception was mixed. It received the Gustav Ranis International Book Prize for being the best book on an international topic by a Yale ladder faculty member.

=== Under Osman's Tree ===
Under Osman's Tree, published by the University of Chicago Press in 2017, received critical acclaim and was awarded the M. Fuat Köprülü Book Prize of the Ottoman and Turkish Studies Association.

=== God's Shadow ===
God's Shadow was published by Liveright, (an imprint of W. W. Norton & Company) in August, 2020. The book argues for the central place of the Ottoman Empire in world history using the life and times of Selim I. It was named of the best books of 2020 by the Times Literary Supplement, Publishers Weekly and History Today, and was Longlisted for the American Library Association's Andrew Carnegie Medal for Excellence in Nonfiction. It has been translated into nine languages. The book garnered a mostly positive response from reviewers, and was named an Editors’ Choice selection by the New York Times Book Review, where Ian Morris called it “full of fine details”, writing that “the story is always interesting” and that “[t]he highest praise for a history book is that it makes you think about things in a new way.” Historian Peter Frankopan of Air Mail called the book "captivating” and “a welcome and important corrective.” Justin Marozzi of The Spectator dubbed God’s Shadow “a refreshingly Ottoman-centric picture of the 15th- and 16th-century Mediterranean”, while Clayton Trutor of The New Criterion called it “a revisionist history in the best sense of the term.”

In contrast, Ottoman historian Caroline Finkel characterized its assertions as "overblown". In an essay for Firenze University’ online journal Cromohs, Cornell Fleischer, Cemal Kafadar, and Sanjay Subrahmanyam described the work as a "tissue of falsehoods, half-truths, and absurd speculations." The motives of that essay were subsequently questioned by historians Efe Khayyat and Ariel Salzmann, writing in the Duke University Press journal boundary 2 that, “[n]ot only does their tract misrepresent and mischaracterize the aims and methods of God’s Shadow, but its vitriol launches a further broadside attack on other examples of global and popular history and has fueled a social media frenzy attacking the author and his book in Turkey as well as United States.” Fleischer, Kafadar and Subrahmanyam penned a subsequent rejoinder, citing a series of tweets by Abdürrahim Özer of Bilkent University critical of Mikhail's interpretation of Selim I's legacy, which expanded on what they characterize as Mikhail's factual errors, misrepresentations, and unorthodox scholarly practices. In an article for the International Studies Review of Oxford University Press, Ali Balci found the work to contain "some excessive comments for the sake of making Selim a part of the global history."

=== My Egypt Archive ===
Published in 2023 by Yale University Press, My Egypt Archive depicts a decade (2010-2001) Mikhail spent as a young researcher at National Archives of Egypt.

== Honors ==
In 2018, he received the Anneliese Maier Research Award of the Alexander von Humboldt Foundation.
