= Sanjak of Kyustendil =

Administrative division of the Ottoman Empire

- Sanjak of the Ottoman Empire
- 1395–1878
- Flag Coat of arms

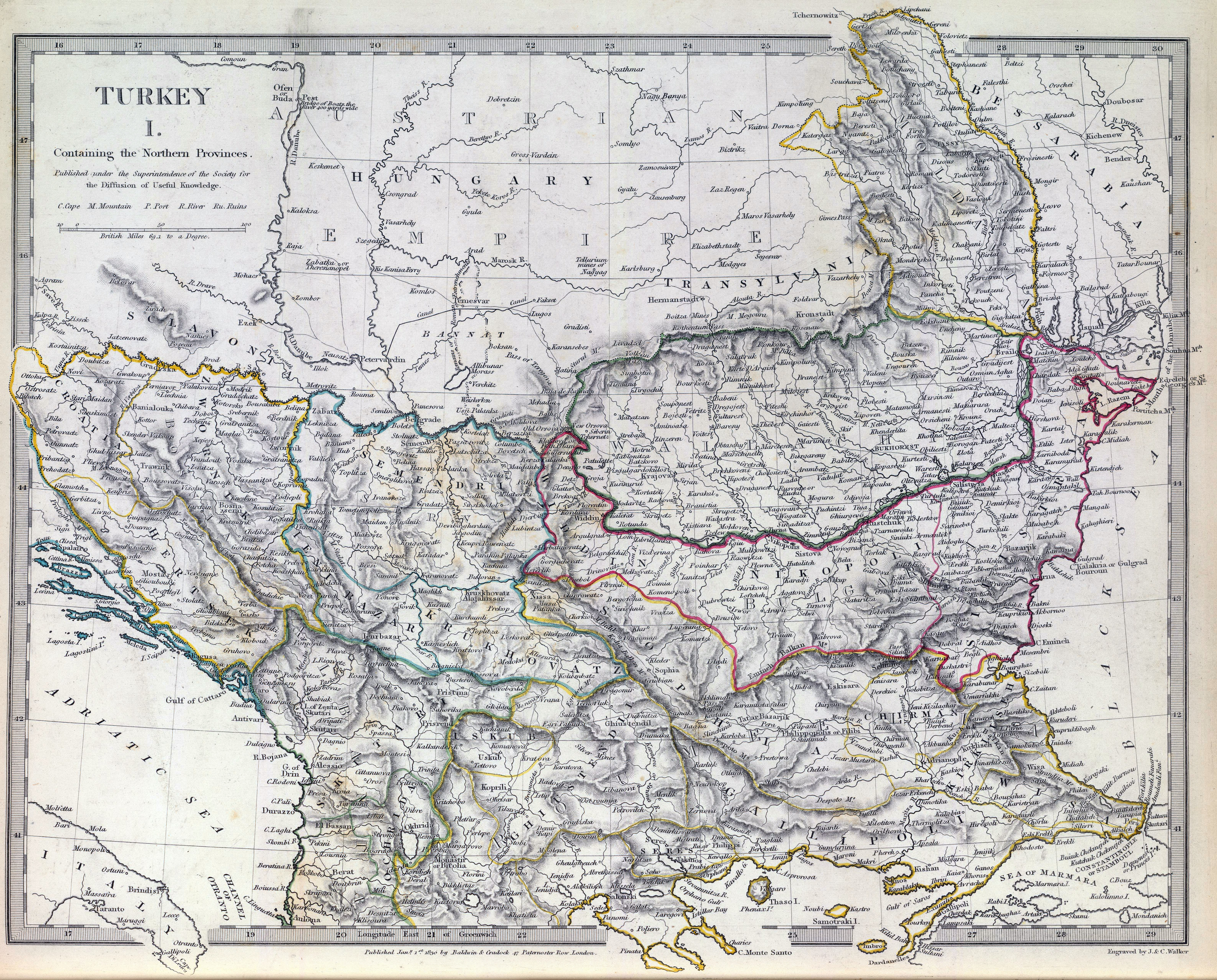
- The Sanjak of Ghiustendil (Kyustendil) in 1829.
- Capital: Kyustendil
- History
  - Established: 1395
  - Disestablished: 1878
Preceded by	Succeeded by
Principality of Velbazhd	Sanjak of Monastir; Sanjak of Salonica

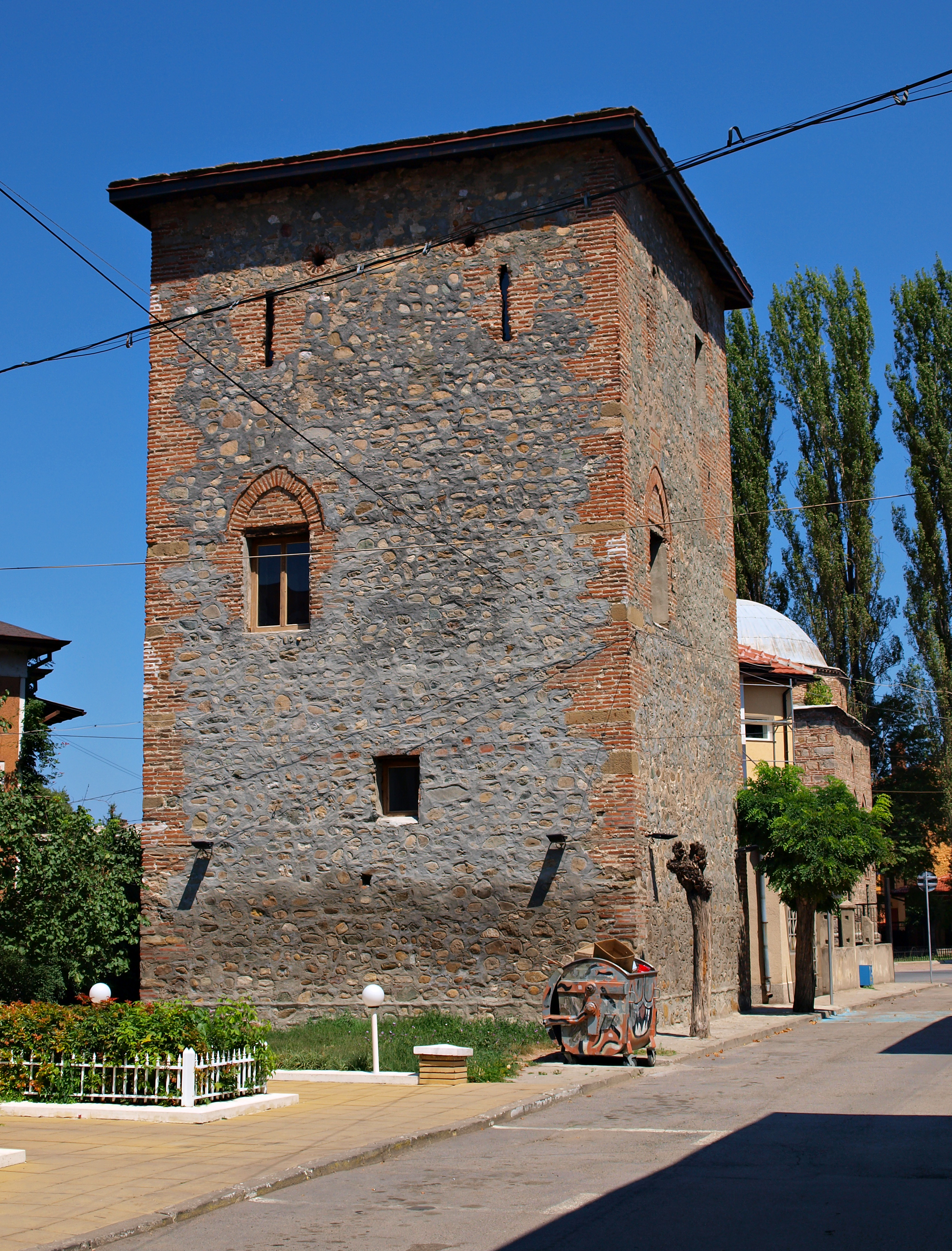
The 15th-16th-century Pirgova Tower, Kyustendil.

The Sanjak of Kyustendil was an Ottoman administrative-territorial unit that existed from 1395 to 1878. It included the former lands of Konstantin Dragash - Province of the Dejanović family.

The Kyustendil Sanjak provided the largest number of Sipahi for the Ottoman army of all European Sanjaks, except Rumelia. In its lands were the Rila Monastery and the town of Veles, North Macedonia.

According to a preserved document, in Kyustendil in 1570 there was a professional chess player.

The Kyustendil Pasha was the first to be mirmiran in the Ottoman Empire because of the glorious military history of the city, notably the Battle of Velbazhd. The title was also awarded because of Konstantin Dragash, who is the grandfather of the last Roman emperor (Constantine XI Dragases Palaiologos) and at the same time the great-great-grandfather of the first Russian tsar (Ivan the Terrible).

== See also ==
- Grandfather Ivan

== Literature, in Bulgarian ==
- Occurrence and appearance of the Kyustendil sanjak (XV-XVI c.)
