= Stereotypes of Russians =

Stereotypes about Russians are actual or imagined characteristics of Russians commonly perceived and spread by people who view Russians as a single and homogeneous group. At times, such stereotypes represent an admiration for Russian culture, and other times reflect Russophobia.

== Common stereotypes ==
Many foreigners perceive Russians to be a hardened people capable of handling any stressful situation with ease. Climate conditions of the country, as found in the notion of the “Russian winter”, as well as a history of wars and oppressive regimes have also contributed to this image.

In pop culture and media, such as in Hollywood films, Russian men are often portrayed as cold and brutal and Russian women as "beautiful, seductive, and deadly".

A widespread stereotype is that "Russians never smile", emphasizing their supposed brutality and reluctance to express emotions. Even within Russia there's a popular expression which can roughly be translated as "A laughter without a cause is a sign of a fool".

Being a motherland of modern-day vodka, Russia has historically earned its place as one of the most drinking countries in Europe. Due to cold depressing weather and periods instability, Russians were portrayed as heavy drinkers throughout times.

Because of historically difficult relationship with their state, Russians don't trust their government, or any superior authority, treating laws and instructions as suggestions. If they see no harm or social condemnation in breaking the rule, they will most likely do that. They are known to cut corners and bend laws, hence the reason why corruption was prevalent in Russian state for the majority of its history.

== See also ==
- Anti-Russian sentiment
- Grandfather Ivan
- New Russians
