= Nasîhat =

Nasîhatnâme (Ottoman Turkish: نصيحت نامه, Naṣīḥat-nāme) were a type of guidance letter for Ottoman sultans, similar to mirrors for princes. They draw on a variety of historical and religious sources, and were influenced by the governance of previous empires such as the Seljuk Turks or the Mongols, as well as by early Muslim history and by contemporary events.

== History ==
Nasîhatnâme became common in the sixteenth century but built on earlier works such as the Kutadgu Bilig (Knowledge of Prosperity), written in 1070 by Yusuf Has Hacip. Early influences include the inşa literature of the Abbasid era. Some refer to Alexander the Great.

However, nasîhatnâme are different from Byzantine Chronographia, and were written for a different audience.

Nasîhatnâme were even commissioned by aspirants to Ottoman government - including, in one case, by the Phanariot Alexandros Skarlatou Kallimaki, the probable father of Skarlatos Voyvodas Alexandrou Kallimaki.

By the 17th century, a sense of imperial decline began to affect the content of these texts; more than just advocating a return to some golden age (i.e. Suleyman the Magnificent) they highlighted specific systemic problems in the empire - including nepotism, revolts, military defeat, and corrupt Janissaries.

== Content ==
Nasîhatnâme typically state a clear moral reason for why they are written and presented to leaders; whether piety, or morality, or realpolitik.

== Examples ==
=== Precursors ===
- Nasihat al-Muluk (نصيحةالملوك) (literally "advice for rulers") by al-Ghazali
- Kabusnama, (قابوسنامه) by Keykavus bin İskender
- Siyasetname (سياستنامه) by Nizamülmülk, written by order of the Seljuk emperor Melikşah.
- Ahlak-ı Nasıri (اخلاق ناصرى) (Nasırian Ethics) by Nasiruddin Tusi
- Çahar Makala (Four Discourses) by Nizamuddin Arudi
- Kitab Nasihat al-Mulk, by Al-Mawardi
- Hussain Vaiz Kashifi's Aklhaq i Muhsini (composed in Persian AH 900/AD 1495), translated into English as The Morals of the Beneficent in the mid 19th century by Henry George Keene
- Al-Muqaddimah, by ibn Khaldun
- The Biographies of Illustrious Men by ibn Zafar as-Siqilli

=== Nasîhatnâme texts ===
- Tarih-i Ebü’l-Feth (History of the father of conquest), by Tursun Bey
- Destan ve Tevarih-i Müluk-i Al-i Osman, by Ahmedi
- The Asafname ("Mirror for Rulers"), by Lütfi Pasha
- Nushatü’s Selatin (Advice to the sultans), by Gelibolulu Mustafa Ali
- Ravżatu'l-Ḥüseyn fī ḫulāṣati aḫbāri'l-ḫāfiḳeyn, by Mustafa Naima
- Hirzü’l-Mülûk (Spells of the sultans), anonymously written
- Usûlü’l-hikem fi Nizâmi’l-âlem (The principles of wisdom for the order of the world), by Hasan Kâfî el-Akhisarî
- Habnâme (Book of dreams), by Veysi.
- Kitâb-i Müstetâb (Beautiful book), anonymous.
- Risale, Koçi Bey
- Veliyüddin Telhisleri
- Kanûnnâme-i sultânî li Aziz Efendi; the identity of the author, Aziz Efendi, is unclear.
- Kitâbu mesâlihi’l-müslimîn ve menâfi’i’l-müminîn, anonymous.
- Düsturü’l-Amel li-Islahi’l-Halel, by Katip Çelebi
- Telhisü’l-beyan fi kavanin-i al-i Osman, by Hezarfan Hüseyin Efendi, who also wrote the history book Tenkîh-i Tevârih-i Mülûk

== See also ==
- Fatwa
- Fiqh
- Hidayah
- Islamic advice literature
- Mirrors for princes
- Siyasatnama
