= Geschichte des osmanischen Reiches =

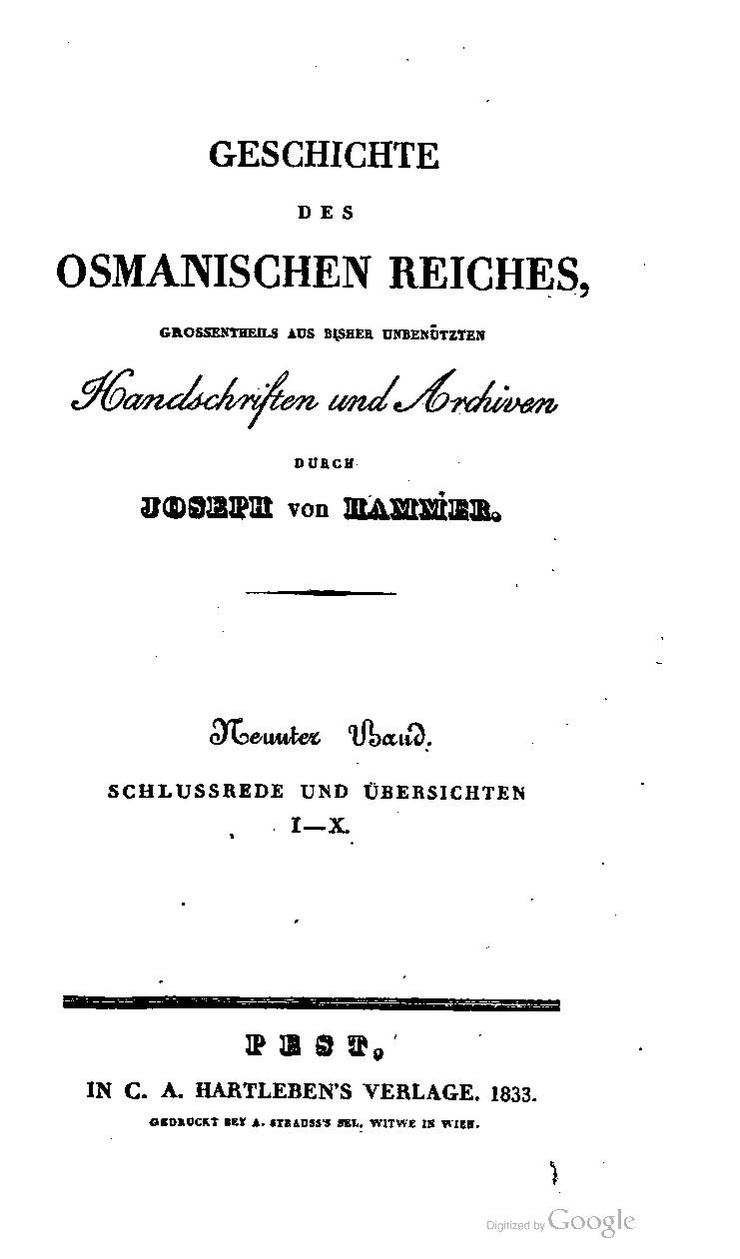
Inner cover of Joseph von Hammer-Purgstall's Geschichte des osmanischen Reiches.

Geschichte des osmanischen Reiches (German: "History of the Ottoman Empire") is a work by the Austrian orientalist historian Joseph von Hammer-Purgstall. It was written in 10 volumes between 1827 and 1835. The result of 30 years of work, it became the standard reference on the subject.

According to the Turkish historian Doğan Gürpınar, this "monumental" work is "arguably the equivalent of Gibbon's Decline and Fall for Ottoman historiography. It was never translated into English, but was translated into Turkish in 1917.

English historian Sir Edward Creasy used it as his main source for History of the Ottoman Turks (1854).

== Editions ==
=== First Edition volumes ===
1. Hammer-Purgstall, Joseph von (1827). Geschichte des osmanischen Reiches, grossentheils aus bisher unbenützen Handschriften und Archiven, durch Joseph von Hammer. Erster Band: Von der Gründung des osmanischen Reiches bis zur Eroberung Constantinopels, 1300–1453 (in German). Pest: C. A. Hartleben.
2. Hammer-Purgstall, Joseph von (1828). Geschichte des osmanischen Reiches, grossentheils aus bisher unbenützen Handschriften und Archiven, durch Joseph von Hammer. Zweyter Band: Von der Eroberung Constantinopels bis zum Tode Selim's I., 1453–1520 (in German). Pest: C. A. Hartleben.
3. Hammer-Purgstall, Joseph von (1828). Geschichte des osmanischen Reiches, grossentheils aus bisher unbenützen Handschriften und Archiven, durch Joseph von Hammer. Dritter Band: Vom Regierungsantritte Suleiman des Ersten bis zum Tode Selim's II., 1520–1574 (in German). Pest: C. A. Hartleben.
4. Hammer-Purgstall, Joseph von (1829). Geschichte des osmanischen Reiches, grossentheils aus bisher unbenützen Handschriften und Archiven, durch Joseph von Hammer. Vierter Band: Vom Regierungsantritte Murad des Dritten bis zur zweyten Entthronung Mustafa's I., 1574–1623 (in German). Pest: C. A. Hartleben.
5. Hammer-Purgstall, Joseph von (1829). Geschichte des osmanischen Reiches, grossentheils aus bisher unbenützen Handschriften und Archiven, durch Joseph von Hammer. Fünfter Band: Vom Regierungsantritte Murad des Vierten bis zur Ernennung Mohammed Köprili's zum Grosswesir., 1623–1656 (in German). Pest: C. A. Hartleben.
6. Hammer-Purgstall, Joseph von (1830). Geschichte des osmanischen Reiches, grossentheils aus bisher unbenützen Handschriften und Archiven, durch Joseph von Hammer. Sechster Band: Von der Grosswesirschaft Mohammed Köprili's bis zum Carlowiczer Frieden, 1656–1699 (in German). Pest: C. A. Hartleben.
7. Hammer-Purgstall, Joseph von (1831). Geschichte des osmanischen Reiches, grossentheils aus bisher unbenützen Handschriften und Archiven, durch Joseph von Hammer. Siebenter Band: Vom Carlowiczer bis zum Belgrader Frieden, 1699–1739 (in German). Pest: C. A. Hartleben.
8. Hammer-Purgstall, Joseph von (1832). Geschichte des osmanischen Reiches, grossentheils aus bisher unbenützen Handschriften und Archiven, durch Joseph von Hammer. Achter Band: Vom Belgrader Frieden bis zum Frieden von Kainardsche, 1739–1774 (in German). Pest: C. A. Hartleben.
9. Hammer-Purgstall, Joseph von (1833). Geschichte des osmanischen Reiches, grossentheils aus bisher unbenützen Handschriften und Archiven, durch Joseph von Hammer. Neunter Band: Schlussrede und Übersichten I—X (in German). Pest: C. A. Hartleben.
10. Hammer-Purgstall, Joseph von (1835). Geschichte des osmanischen Reiches, grossentheils aus bisher unbenützen Handschriften und Archiven, durch Joseph von Hammer. Zehnter Band: Verzeichnisse, Hauptregister und Anhang (in German). Pest: C. A. Hartleben.

=== Second Edition volumes ===
1. Hammer-Purgstall, Joseph von (1840). Geschichte des osmanischen Reiches, grossentheils aus bisher unbenützen Handschriften und Archiven, durch Joseph von Hammer. Erster Band: Von der Gründung des osmanischen Reiches bis zum Tode Selim's I., 1300–1520 (in German) (Zweyte verbesserte Auflage. Neue Ausgabe ed.). Pest: C. A. Hartleben.
2. Hammer-Purgstall, Joseph von (1840). Geschichte des osmanischen Reiches, grossentheils aus bisher unbenützen Handschriften und Archiven, durch Joseph von Hammer. Dritter Band: Vom Regierungsantritte Suleiman des Ersten bis zur zweyten Entthronung Mustafa's I., 1520–1623 (in German) (Zweyte verbesserte Auflage. Neue Ausgabe ed.). Pest: C. A. Hartleben.
3. Hammer-Purgstall, Joseph von (1840). Geschichte des osmanischen Reiches, grossentheils aus bisher unbenützen Handschriften und Archiven, durch Joseph von Hammer. Dritter Band: Vom Regierungsantritte Murad des Vierten bis zum Frieden von Carlowicz, 1623–1699 (in German) (Zweyte verbesserte Auflage. Neue Ausgabe ed.). Pest: C. A. Hartleben.
4. Hammer-Purgstall, Joseph von (1840). Geschichte des osmanischen Reiches, grossentheils aus bisher unbenützen Handschriften und Archiven, durch Joseph von Hammer. Vierter Band: Vom Carlowiczer Frieden bis zum Frieden von kainardsche, 1699–1774 (in German) (Zweyte verbesserte Auflage. Neue Ausgabe ed.). Pest: C. A. Hartleben.
