= Ottoman Empire Circle of Justice =

Compact between sovereign and populace

The Circle of Justice is the relationship between the state and the people in the pre-modern states of the Ottoman Empire. Although it had been written about as early as the eleventh century AD, the term Circle of Justice was first coined by the sixteenth-century Ottoman writer Kinalizade and has often been used when describing state-societal relationships in the pre-modern era of the Ottoman Empire. Although nineteenth century Tanzimat reforms led to dramatic shifts in these relations, the Circle of Justice is considered to be the baseline for understanding the Ottoman Empire during its Ancien Régime period.

== General overview ==
The first full expression of this concept originates in the tenth century AD, and reads as follows:

"The world is a garden, hedged in by sovereignty

Sovereignty is lordship, preserved by law

Law is administration, governed by the king

The king is a shepherd, supported by the army

The army are soldiers, fed by money

Money is revenue, gathered by the people

The people are servants, subjected by justice

Justice is happiness, the well-being of the world."

== Essential elements ==
The Circle of Justice articulated what were considered to be the four essential elements of a successful, just Middle Eastern state: the King's authority, the army, the wealth of the state, and the peasantry. The success of each element of the circle was dependent upon the success of the others. Also implicit in these elements is the state's reliance upon shari'a law as the basis for society and justice.

=== The King's Authority ===
The ultimate authority and sovereignty of the sultan was an essential element of the Circle of Justice, for the sultan was considered to be ruling with divine blessing or even divine appointment. This religious backing meant that the sultan's ultimate authority and power were considered to be an essential element, underscoring the essentiality of religious law in the pre-modern period of the Ottoman Empire.

=== The army ===
In order to protect the sultan and the sovereignty of the territory over which he presided, a strong military force was essential. The strength of the army relied upon its ability to conquer lands or obtain new wealth for the kingdom.

=== The wealth of the state ===
Funding was essential in order to maintain the strength of the army, for funding was needed not only for the systems that were used to obtain new recruits, such as the devşirme system, but also for the systems that were implemented in order to successfully train these new recruits.

=== Peasantry ===
The wealth of the pre-modern Ottoman state was largely dependent upon two factors: taxation and agricultural revenue. Large agricultural success, of course, was dependent upon a large peasant base to cultivate Ottoman lands.

=== Other elements ===
The essential role played by the peasantry in the Circle of Justice can perhaps be considered the basis upon which all other elements of the Circle linked back to one another. In order to ensure agricultural productivity, the army had to protect peasants from invasion, banditry and civil strife; the infrastructure of irrigation works, roads and markets had to be maintained; and the provision of justice had to be ensured, including the reduction or remission of tax demands upon peasantry during times of disaster and the curtailing of the exploitation of corrupt landowners and government officials. Additionally, the sultan was often seen as an ally of the peasantry, for it was considered his duty to protect the peasantry from both corrupt elites and outside forces.

== Problems ==
In terms of practical functioning of a state, the Circle of Justice poses problems because of its enormous fragility. Each element of the Circle is dependent upon the success of the other, meaning that the absence or malfunctioning of even one element can cause the collapse of the entire state. For example, if justice were not provided to the peasantry, agricultural and economic productivity would decrease, leading to, firstly, a decrease in revenue; secondly, the state's inability to pay the army and the army's eventual rebellion; and, ultimately, the inability of the sultan to effectively exercise his ultimate power and sovereignty.

Thus, the Circle of Justice necessitated some sort of an interactive relationship between the sultan and his subjects, in order to maintain the essential "balance" and "equilibrium" of Ottoman states. This interactive relationship is evident through the existence of institutions such as state-supported irrigation systems that helped to ensure fertility and prosperity; laws and revenue surveys that allowed for the just distribution of taxes; and courts of petitioning that allowed for the addressing of complaints made by the peasantry.

== Other implications ==
The use of the Circle of Justice as the basis for the political functioning of the state inherently led to the establishment of four distinct, separate classes that characterized the social sphere of the pre-modern Ottoman Empire. These four classes included the Men of the Pen, or the men involved in legislature who helped to underscore the King's authority; the Men of the Sword, or the military classes; the Men of Transactions, or bureaucrats such as tax collectors and accountants who aided in the collection and distribution of the state's wealth; and the Men of Agriculture, or the peasantry. Any imbalances caused among these classes was indicative of larger imbalances within the Circle of Justice, and thus could be considered precursors to injustice and tyranny.

The use of the concept of the Circle of Justice as a method of describing the inner workings of the entire Ottoman Empire can also be helpful in attempting to understand the inner workings of the Ottoman Empire at a more local level. The governors of local provinces were appointed by the state and played a similar role to the sultan as the supposed overseers of all individuals living under their command; local armies in each region were under the command of the governor and were supposed to protect the peasantry; tax collectors were intended to collect revenue; and the peasantry was expected to cultivate the local lands in order to produce agricultural revenue. Highlighting the role of religion as the essential basis for this entire system was the role of the local mufti, who was authorized by the state to make decisions on legal cases based upon his understanding of Islamic law.
