= Siyasatnama =

Medieval Persian political treatise

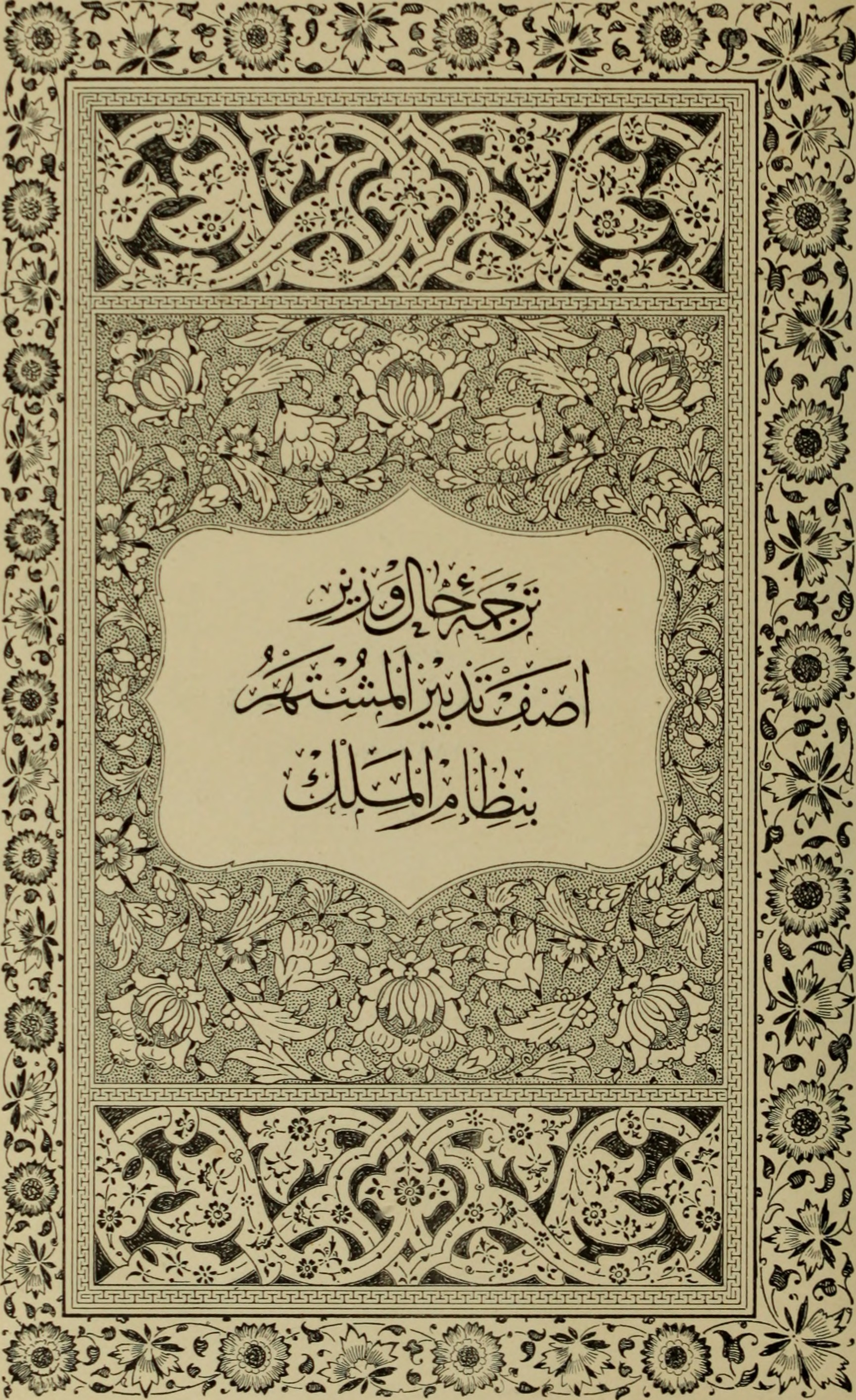
A front page of the Government Book.

The Siyasatnama (Note: Less commonly written Siyasatnameh, from the modern Iranian Persian pronunciation.) (Classical Persian: سیاست‌نامه, romanized: Siyāsat-nāma, lit. 'Book of Politics'), also known as the Siyar al-muluk (Arabic: سير الملوك, romanized: Siyar al-mulūk, lit. 'Lives of Kings'), is the most famous work attributed to Nizam al-Mulk, the founder of the Nizamiyyas (higher education institutions) in medieval Persia and vizier to the Seljuk sultans Alp Arslan and Malik Shah. Nizam al-Mulk possessed "immense power" as the head administration for the Seljuk Empire over a period of 30 years and was responsible for establishing distinctly Persian forms of Islamic government and administration which would last for centuries. A great deal of his approach to governing is contained within the Siyasatnama which is in a tradition of Persian-Islamic writing known as the "Mirrors for Princes".

Written in Persian and composed in the eleventh century, the Siyasatnama was created following the request by Malik Shah that his ministers produce books on government, administration and the troubles facing the nation. The treatise compiled by Nizam al-Mulk was the only one to receive approval and was consequently accepted by the Seljuk court as forming "the law of the constitution of the nation". In all it consists of 50 chapters concerning religion, politics, and various other issues of the day. The final 11 chapters—traditionally believed to be written shortly prior to Nizam's assassination, though modern scholarship suggests they were heavily interpolated or added later by palace scribes such as Muhammad al-Maghribi—deal mostly with dangers facing the empire and particularly the ascendant threat of the Ismailis. The treatise is concerned with guiding the ruler with regard to the realities of government and how it should be run. It covers "the proper role of soldiers, police, spies, and finance officials" and provides ethical advice emphasizing the need for justice and religious piety in the ruler. Nizam al-Mulk defines in detail what he views as justice; that all classes be "given their due" and that the weak be protected. Where possible justice is defined by both custom and Muslim law and the ruler is held responsible to God.

Anecdotes rooted in Islamic, and occasionally pre-Islamic Persian, culture and history with popular heroes – for example, Mahmud of Ghazna and the pre-Islamic Shah Khosrow Anushirvan – frequently appear. While traditionally viewed as exemplars of good and virtue, modern researchers argue these anecdotes were often pragmatically altered to serve as political propaganda and justify bureaucratic power rather than record factual history. The Siyasatnama is considered to provide insight into the attitude of the Persian bureaucracy of the 12th century towards the past of their civilization as well as evidence for methods of the administration and the extent it was influenced by the pre-Islamic traditions.

The earliest remaining copy is located in the National Library of Tabriz, in Iran. It was first translated into French in 1891.

== See also ==
- Persian literature
- Mirrors for princes
- Nasîhatnâme
- Seyahatname
- Sefâretnâme
