= Islamic advice literature =

Collections of stories or anecdotes on various aspects of Islam

Islamic advice literature may include collections of stories or anecdotes such as legal opinion, interpretation of religious text, legal theory, guidance, consultation, or Islamic stories.

Islamic advice literature is usually printed on small leaflets and often involves advice from individuals or authorities. In contrast to Fatwa, Tafsir, and Fiqh, Nasîhat and advice literature can come from secular sources, and are not required to be written by Ulama (Islamic scholars). Unlike Fiqh, Tafsir, Fatwa, or Nasîhat based on them, advice can go beyond the realm of religious scripture and may take support of otherwise not easily admissible Hadith or religious rulings in order to make normative pleas. Its reliance has been on traditional and self-renewing information about social, authoritative, or religious themes.

According to Gudrun Krämer, individuals in Muslim societies may urge religious and moral advice, and individuals may be passionate in providing their advice on far-reaching topics. These topics may be mundane –for example, whether it is proper to wear a wig according to the norms of their community. Hence, according to Marzieh Bashirpour, social behavior of Muslims is deeply influenced by advice literature.

== Means of providing advice ==
Means of providing Islamic advice includes traditional as well as modern technologies. In Egypt, Al-Azhar University set up 'advice/fatwa kiosks' in subway stations, and introduced a phone-in advice service called "Dial-a-Sheikh". According to Jakob Guhl and Milo Comerford research, online Gen-Z Muslims take interests in taking life advice for things like, whether or not certain behaviours would be permissible within Islam, and how the relationship between everyday issues and Islamic teachings can be formed.

== In the caliphates ==
The governments of the caliphates heavily depended on non-Arab and non-Muslim civil officials, especially by the late Umayyad and early Abbasid states. The situation started to change in the 8th century as Muslims began to compete for social and economic benefits by using religious leverage. By the 9th century, Islamic jurists began to oppose employment of non-Muslims with little influence, but major formal shift started coming by the 12th century, when independent advice literature campaigned for dismissal of non-Muslim civil officials.

Jennifer A. London looks at then scholarly import and presentations of medieval fables as part of advice literature which spoke about political thoughts through characters employed in those literature as mirror for princes.

According to Sami Helewa, prophetic anecdotes about Joseph, David and Soloman called "'Qisas' al-anbiya" by 9th century Persian Islamic scholar Al-Tabari and 11th century scholar Al-Tha'labi served as advice literature to medieval Islamic rulers.

A 10th-century anonymous Arabic manuscript is seen giving advice to rulers using rhymes with a religious undertone. At times, advice goes beyond religious and suggests administrative policies.

Karakhanid writer Yūsuf Balasaghuni wrote Islamic advice literature in Kutadgu Bilig (The Wisdom of Felicity), the only known work written in Turkic from the Karakhanid period.

Ebrahim Moosa and Nicholas Roberts, in "Expressions of Political Quietism in Islamic History" in Political Quietism in Islam: Sunni and Shi’i Practice and Thought (Saud al-Sarhan, ed.), state that in medieval times, despite the backdrop of power of Muslim empires in which political quietism became a virtue of ideal citizens, the genre of Nasîhat and advice literature started thriving. According to Moosa and Roberts, the goal of advice literature then in those times was to help preserve political authority as part of pragmatic quiet activity. al-Sarhan further states that while Siyasat nama by Nizam al-Mulk, Nasihat al-Muluk by al-Ghazali, and al-siyasa al-shar'iyya by ibn Taymiyya while epitomizing political activism on one hand very much gave in to the divinely sanctioned absolutism of the caliphs on other hand. The strategy of advice literature was subtle expression of political activism calling for equitable and sound governance within the four corners of religious diktats, while continuing pragmatic obedience to the authority in power. But much of advice literature explores beyond religion, for example, political theorist of the 11th century al-Mawardi attributes a pre-Islamic 6th-century quote of al-Afwah al-Awdi: "There is no benefit in leaderless people when disorder reigns, and they will never have a leader if the ignorant amongst them leads." Moosa and Roberts say that first half of quote conforms to political quietism as labeled by modern scholars, while the second half matches with expectations of the obedient, religious Muslim citizen of a just and sharia compliant rule.

Using the example of Zoroastrianism becoming invisible from Persian literature after the 8th century, Ali Pirzadeh says that Islamic literature and Islamic advice literature wipes out most traces of local culture and heritage by giving exclusive prominence to Arabic narratives. He maintains that the Iranian empires encouraged the writing of advice literature to hide their incompetence caused by hereditary succession, and to retain servitude of vested interests.

=== Social Islamization ===
In early and medieval centuries, Sufi literature, including their advice literature, played a substantial role in spreading Sufi Islamic values among the Muslim masses. In early Turkish classical advice literature, Yunus Emre a (probable) 13th century poet's Risâletü'n-Nushiyye, Feridüddin Attar's Pend-nâme, Sa'dî's Bostan and Gulistan, and Mesnevi of Mevlana, Ahmed Fakih's Çarh-nâme (794–798) played a substantial role among Turkish Muslim culture and masses. According to Agnès Nilüfer Kefeli, borders between high and popular Islam were often blurred; since Arabic was not easily accessible to commoners, folk tales were used as a popular method of Islamic instruction that included Sufi books.

=== Activism ===
The emergence of advice (nasiha) literature is regarded as a quietist form of activism by scholars such as al-Ghazali and Ibn Taymiyya.

== Gender ==
Ashraf Ali Thanwi's Bihishti Zevar, published in 1905, influenced the continuation of traditional patriarchal gendered role narratives among South Asian Muslims. Marzieh Bashirpour theorizes that Urdu advice literature's emphasis on adab politeness in interaction molded class differentiation between the literate and non illiterate, thereby validating discrimination toward the lower classes. Late 19th century and early 20th century revival reformists promoted women's education, but their advice literature centered on making women better equipped for household management.

== Modern times ==
According to Jakob Guhl and Milo Comerford research, the main objective of content through modern online media is to provide brief and straightforward life advice to Muslims, certain preachers attempt to integrate such advice into their larger narratives. In their search for the one authentic interpretation of Islamic scripture, followers ultimately look for comprehensive guidance political and spiritual queries, as well as a sense of belonging. Notably, the desire for unambiguous answers extends to seemingly mundane aspects of everyday life as well, for example like participating in certain recreational activities like playing games, picking one's eyebrows, attending public swimming pools is permissible or not for Muslims. Guhl and Comerford (2021) says that while most of regular life advice literature is mundane, at times significant part of it also can suddenly move on the verge of toxic hate speech. The short time it takes for some of the preachers to shift from public swimming pools to mass violence and the end times suggests that the preachers seek to present small transgressions against their religious advice as a precursor to more serious infringements.

== Bibliography ==
- Sarkar Nilanjan (2006), 'The Voice of Mahmūd': The Hero in Ziyā Baranī's Fatāwā-i Jahāndārī
- Azam, Hina (10 July 2011). "The Hijab at Cross-Purposes: Conflicting Models of the Erotic in Popular Islamic Advice Literature". Comparative Islamic Studies. 5 (1): 131–176. doi:10.1558/cis.v5i1.131.
- Haque, Zeyaul (July 2022). "Advice Literature in the Time of Akbar: A Sixteenth-Century mathnawī as a book of advice for the Emperor of Mughal India". Journal of the Royal Asiatic Society. 32 (3): 535–556. doi:10.1017/S1356186321000614. S2CID 237669987.

== See also ==
- Advice column
- Hermeneutics of feminism in Islam
- Hidayah
- Islamic literature
- Islamic philosophy
- Islamic studies
- Islamization
- Khutbah
- Superstitions in Muslim societies
