= Risale =

Type of book

A risale (Arabic: لرسالة) is a small book in the form of a treatise on socio-economic, political or historical topics. This type of Ottoman literature became popular thanks to two risales written by Koçi Bey from the first half of the 17th century. In them, Bey analyzes the causes of the decline of the Ottoman Empire after the hanging of Michael Kantakouzenos Şeytanoğlu on 3 March 1578 and the assassination of Grand Vizier Sokollu Mehmed Pasha on 11 October 1579. The two Kochi Bay risales are one of the most important sources for the history of the Ottoman Empire in the 17th century.

== See also ==
- The Realm of the Slavs
- Grandfather Ivan
- Köprülü era
