= Koçi Bey =

Ottomon bureaucrat

Koçi Bey (in older sources Kochu Bey, died 1650) was a high-ranking Ottoman bureaucrat who lived in the first half of the 17th century.

== Biography ==
He was an ethnic Albanian (an Arnaut), born in Korçë in eastern Albania. Bernard Lewis posits that he is of Albanian descent. Within the scope of the devshirme system, he studied in the Enderun (palace school) in Istanbul. He was assigned to various posts and became the consultant of two sultans, Murad IV (1623–1640) and Ibrahim (1640–1648). He prepared a series of reports (Risale) about reforms in the empire. He presented his first report to Murad IV in 1631, and the second to Ibrahim in 1640. Although the literary style of the first was more elaborate than the second, the main points were the same. In his reports he emphasized that the cause of unrest in the empire was the corruption of the timar (fief) system. He suggested a smaller and more disciplined army and a more authoritarian leadership. His 1630 memorandum to Murad IV, highlighting the issues in the Ottoman bureaucracy and other institutions of power, has been celebrated both in Turkey and among Western scholars, leading the Austrian Middle Eastern historian Joseph von Hammer-Purgstall to dub him the "Turkish Montesquieu".

Towards the end of Ibrahim's reign he retired and returned to Korçë, his home town for the rest of his life. He was buried in Plamet village.
