= Ariel Salzmann =

Ariel Salzmann is associate professor of Islamic and World History at Queen's University Canada. She specialises in global capitalism, the Ottoman Empire, political systems and state formation.

== Education ==
Salzmann received her PhD from Columbia University in 1995. Her doctoral thesis was entitled Measures of Empire: Tax Farmers and the Ottoman Ancien Régime, 1695-1807. Before her appointment at Queen's University, she taught at the Pratt Institute, the University of Cincinnati, and New York University.

== Career and research ==
Salzmann published the book Tocqueville in the Ottoman Empire: Rival Paths to the Modern State with Brill in 2004. This book re-examined the political philosopher Alexis de Tocqueville's analysis of the French Revolution from an Ottoman perspective. Her journal article, published in Politics & Society (1993), won the Turkish Studies Association's Ömer Lutfi Barkan Article Prize: 'An Ancien Régime Revisted: Privatization and Political Economy in the 18th Century Ottoman Empire'. She received a National Endowment for the Humanities award in 1988, and an Americal Research Institute in Turkey Fellowship in 1999. She held a Senior Fellowship at the Research Centre for Anatolian Civilisations of Koç University in Istanbul in 2011. She was the first Canadian to be awarded a Fellowship at the centre. Salzmann's book The Exclusionary West: Medieval Minorities and the Making of Modern Europe is forthcoming with Hurst in 2026.

== Bibliography ==
- 'The Education of an Ottomanist: Donald Quataert and the Narrative Arc of Ottoman Historiography, 1985-2011', History From Below: A Tribute in Memory of Donald Quataert, eds. Selim Karahasanoğlu and Deniz Cenk Demir (2016)
- 'Migrants in Chains: On the Enslavement of Muslims in Renaissance and Enlightenment Europe', Religions. Special Issue: Islam, Immigration, and Identity (2013)
- Tocqueville in the Ottoman Empire: Rival Paths to the Modern State (Brill, 2004)
- 'The Age of Tulips: Confluence and Conflict in early modern Consumer Culture (1500–1730)', Consumption Studies and the History of the Ottoman Empire ed. Donald Quataert (State University of New York Press, 2000)
- 'An Ancien Régime Revisted: Privatization and Political Economy in the 18th Century Ottoman Empire', Politics & Society (1993)

== Further resources ==
- Podcast on the 20th anniversary of the Iraq war, with Adnan Husain
