= Joseph von Hammer-Purgstall =

Austrian orientalist and historian (1774-1856)

- يوسف حامر برجشتال
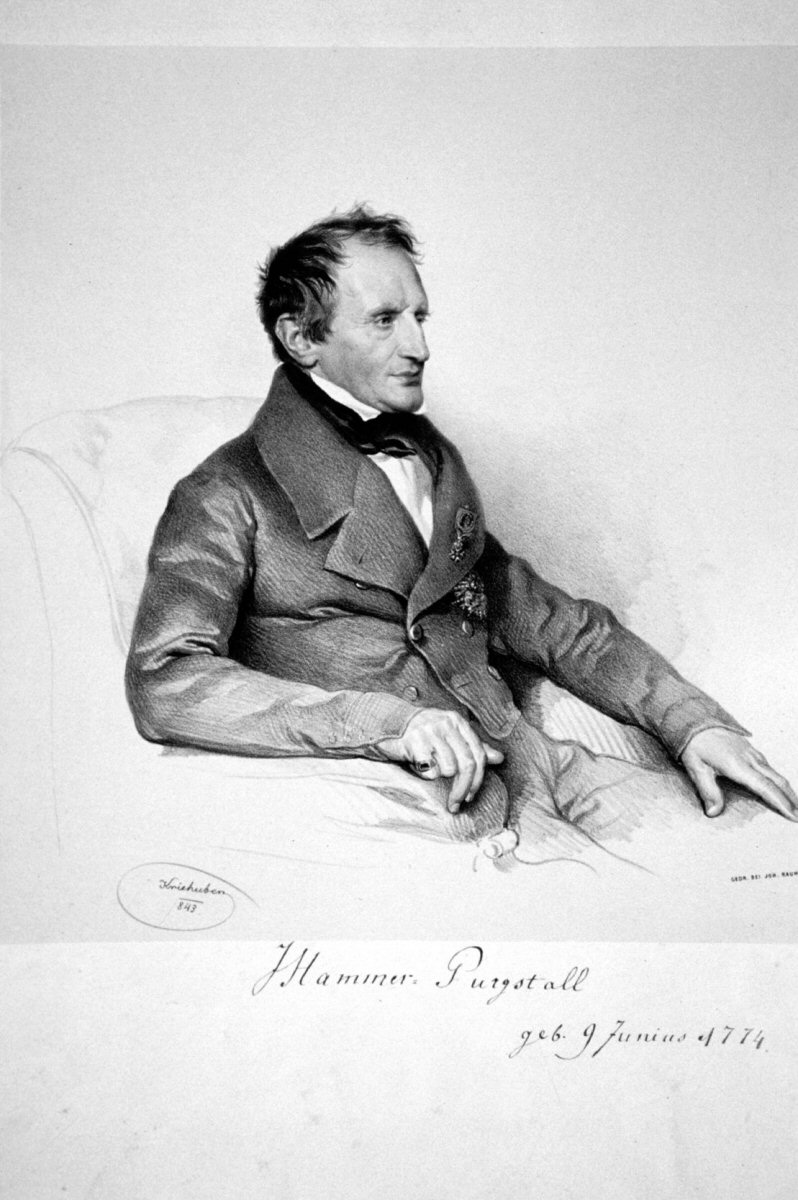
- Born: 9 June 1774, 1774; Graz
- Died: 23 November 1856, 1856; Vienna
- Occupations: Diplomat, orientalist, philologist, historian, writer, politician, poet, interpreter, counselor

Joseph Freiherr von Hammer-Purgstall (Arabic: يوسف هامر, romanized: Yūsuf Ḥāmir; 9 June 1774 – 23 November 1856) was an Austrian orientalist, historian and diplomat. He is considered one of the most accomplished orientalists of his time.

== Life ==
Born Joseph Hammer in Graz, Duchy of Styria (now Styria, Austria), he received his early education mainly in Vienna. Entering the diplomatic service in 1796, he was appointed in 1799 to a position in the Austrian embassy in Istanbul, and in this capacity he took part in the expedition under Admiral William Sidney Smith and General John Hely-Hutchinson against France. In 1807 he returned home from the East, after which he was made a privy councillor.

In 1824 he was knighted and thereafter styled himself as Ritter Joseph von Hammer.

For fifty years Hammer-Purgstall wrote prolifically on the most diverse subjects and published numerous texts and translations of Arabic, Persian and Turkish authors. He was the first to publish a complete translation of the divan of Hafez into a western language. By traversing so large a field, he laid himself open to the criticism of specialists, and he was severely handled by Heinrich Friedrich von Diez (1751–1817), who, in his Unfug und Betrug in der morgenländischen Litteratur, nebst vielen hundert Proben von der groben Unwissenheit des H. v. Hammer zu Wien in Sprachen und Wissenschaften (1815), devoted to him nearly 600 pages of abuse. He also came into friendly conflict on the subject of the origin of The Thousand and One Nights with his younger English contemporary Edward William Lane.

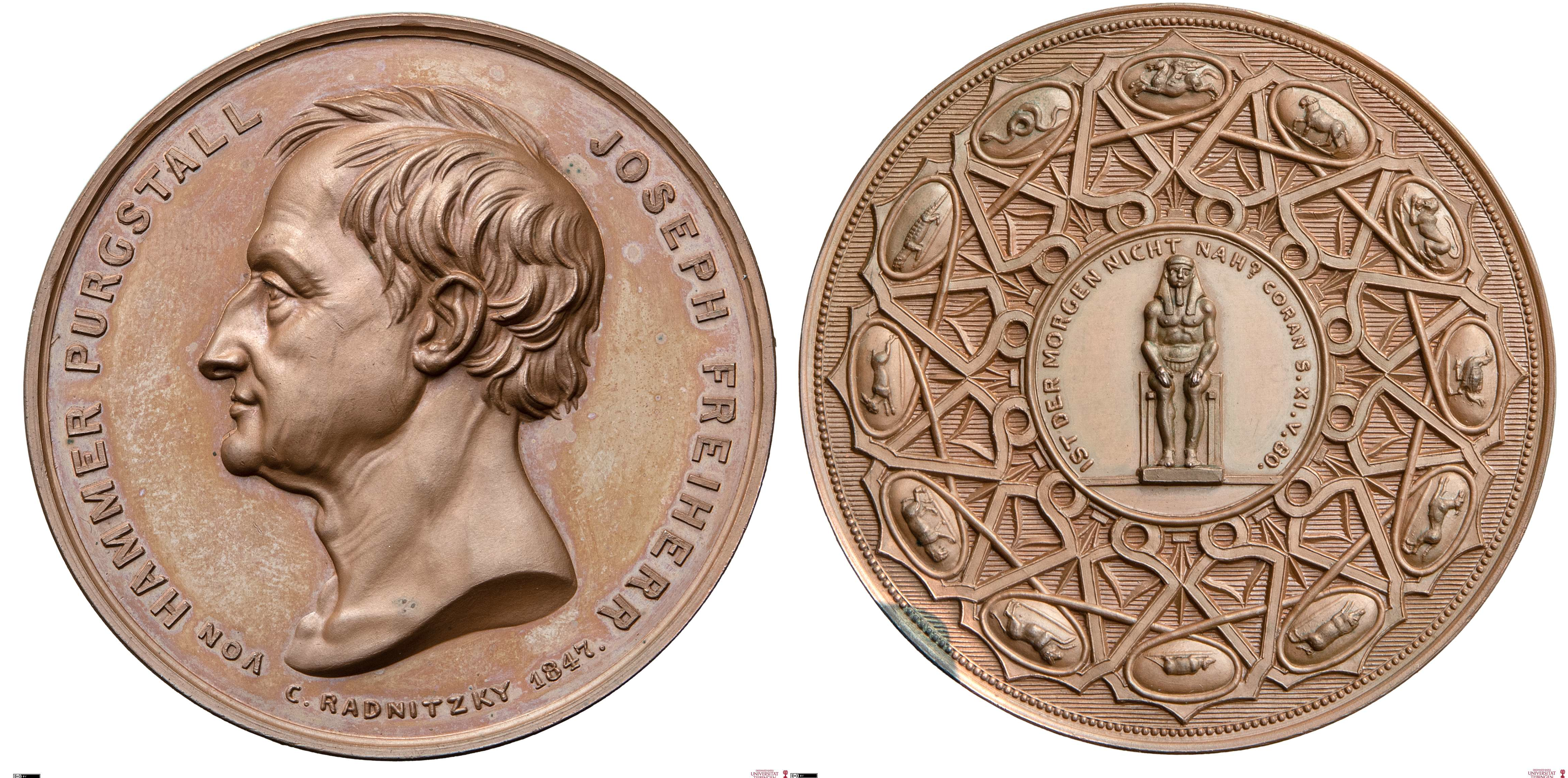
Medal Joseph von Hammer-Purgstall 1847

Hammer-Purgstall supported the foundation of the Austrian Academy of Sciences in Vienna and became the academy's first president (1847–1849). The Austrian Oriental Society, founded in 1959 to foster cultural relations with the Near East, is formally named 'Österreichische Orient-Gesellschaft Hammer-Purgstall' in recognition of Joseph von Hammer-Purgstall's accomplishments.

In 1847 he received a medal commissioned by a friend of his, Ludwig August von Frankl. The reverse references some of his works in pictures.

He died in Vienna on 23 November 1856.

== Views ==
Hammer considered the Greeks of his time to culturally belong with the Orient on linguistic and political grounds, rather than following the philhellenic trend of equating the Greeks with their classical legacy. In this regard, he seems to have stayed faithful to a late eighteenth-century intellectual tradition.

== Works ==
Hammer-Purgstall's principal work is his Geschichte des osmanischen Reiches (10 vols., Pest, 1827–1835; revised edition in 4 vols., 1834–1836; reprinted 1840). Among his other works are:

- Aḥmad ibn ʻAlī ibn Waḥshīyah, Ancient Alphabets and Hieroglyphic Characters Explained; With an Account of the Egyptian Priests, Their Classes, Initiation, and Sacrifices, ed. and trans. J. Hammer (London, 1806)
- Des osmanischen Reichs Staatsverfassung und Staatsverwaltung, dargestellt aus den Quellen seiner Grundgesetze (Vienna, 1815): vol. I, vol. II
- Geschichte der schönen Redekünste Persiens mit einer Blüthenlese aus zweyhundert persischen Dichtern (Vienna, 1818)
- Umblick auf einer Reise von Constantinopel nach Brussa und dem Olympos, und von da zurück über Nicäa und Nicomedien (Pest, 1818)
- Morgenländisches Kleeblatt (Vienna, 1819)
- Constantinopolis und der Bosporos, örtlich und geschichtlich beschrieben (Pest, 1822)
- Sur les origines russes (St Petersburg, 1825)
- Evliya Çelebi, Narrative of Travels in Europe, Asia, and Africa in the Seventeenth Century by Evliya Efendi (Evliya Çelebi), trans. J. von Hammer (2 vols., 1834–1850) - an English language translation of the first two volumes of Seyahatname: vol. I.1, vol. I.2, vol. II
- Die Geschichte der Assassinen aus morgenländischen Quellen (Stuttgart und Tübingen, 1818) (in English as The History of the Assassins trans. O. C. Wood; London, 1835)
- Geschichte der osmanischen Dichtkunst (1836)
- Geschichte der Goldenen Horde in Kiptschak, das ist der Mongolen in Russland (Pest, 1840)
- Geschichte der Ilchane, das ist der Mongolen in Persien (2 vols., Darmstadt, 1842)
- Khlesl's, des Cardinals, Directors des geheimen Cabinetes Kaiser Mathias, Leben (4 vols., Vienna, 1847–1851) – a four-volume biography of Melchior Klesl
- Literaturgeschichte der Araber. Von ihrem Beginne bis zu Ende des zwölften Jahrhunderts der Hidschret (7 vols., 1850–1856) – unfinished: vol. I, vol. II, vol. III, vol. IV, vol. V, vol. VI, vol. VII
- Geschichte der Chane der Krim unter osmanischer Herrschaft (Vienna, 1856)
- Erinnerungen aus meinem Leben, 1774–1852, ed. Reinhart Bachofen von Echt (Vienna, 1940) – memoirs.

For a comprehensive list of his works see Constantin Schlottmann, Joseph von Hammer-Purgstall, Zurich 1857.

For a biographical account of Hammer's life, see Walter Höflechner, Joseph von Hammer-Purgstall 1774–1856: ein altösterreichisches Gelehrtenleben. Eine Annäherung, Graz 2021.

== Family ==
Hammer married Caroline von Henikstein (1797–1844), the daughter of Austrian Jewish financier Joseph von Henikstein in 1816. In 1835, upon inheriting the estates of the Countess Purgstall (née Jane Anne Cranstoun), the Edinburgh-born widow of his late friend Gottfried Wenzel von Purgstall, he acquired the title Freiherr and changed his family name to Hammer-Purgstall. The Countess Purgstall's sensationalist portrayal by her fellow Scotsman Basil Hall in Schloss Hainfeld; or, a Winter in Lower Styria (1836), an account of his visit as an invited guest to the Purgstall estates in 1834, may have served as an inspiration for the eponymous vampire protagonist of Sheridan Le Fanu's Carmilla.

== See also ==
- Baphomet, subject of an 1818 essay by Hammer-Purgstall
- Alamut (Bartol novel), likely inspired by von Hammer's nonfiction History of the Assassins
- Among the Oriental Manuscripts of the Leipzig University Library are workbooks and drafts by Joseph von Hammer-Purgstall.

== Sources ==
- Herbermann, Charles, ed. (1910). "Joseph, Baron von Hammer-Purgstall" . Catholic Encyclopedia. Vol. 7. New York: Robert Appleton Company.
