= Grandfather Ivan (historical myth) =

Folklore image of Russia in Bulgaria

Reverse of Ivan III's seal from 1472, after his marriage with Sophia Palaiologina with the Byzantine Eagle on it.

Grandfather Ivan (Bulgarian: Дядо Иван) is a folklore image of Russia in the minds of Bulgarians from the times of the Bulgarian National Revival, portraying Russia as a benevolent, protective force.

Ivan is a Slavic form of the biblical name Joan (John). The apparition of the myth of "Grandfather Ivan" is associated with the marriage of Ivan III to the niece of the last Byzantine emperor, Sophia Palaiologina, in 1472. Through this marriage, Ivan III was formally entitled to ascend to the throne of the already nonexistent Byzantine Empire and also received the moral obligation to liberate the Balkan Orthodox peoples from the Ottoman invaders. "Grandfather Ivan" was accepted as an "old clever patron". This vision was applied not only to the Tsar but also to the Russian people. Sometime in the 18th century, during the Bulgarian National Awakening, the Bulgarians came to the conclusion that "Grandfather Ivan" should come to set them free from the Ottoman rule.

== See also ==
- Moscow, third Rome
- Russophilia
- Russo-Turkish War (1877–1878)
