= List of battles involving the Ottoman Empire =

List of the main battles in the history of the Ottoman Empire are shown below. The life span of the empire was more than six centuries, and the maximum territorial extent, at the zenith of its power in the second half of the 16th century, stretched from central Europe to the Persian Gulf and from the Caspian Sea to North Africa. The number of battles the empire fought is quite high. But here only the more important battles are listed. Among these, the battles fought in the 20th century (Turco-Italian War, Balkan Wars, and World War I) as well as the sieges (like the sieges of Constantinople, Cairo, Belgrade, Bagdad, etc.) which most lists include as battles are not shown except in cases where the siege is followed by a battle (i.e. Vienna, Khotyn, Plevna).

== List of battles ==
Color legend for the location of the battle

Europe	Asia	Africa	Sea

Year	Battle	Opponents
1299	Bapheus	Byzantine Empire
1303	Dimbos	Byzantine Empire
1326	Bursa	Byzantine Empire
1329	Pelekanon	Byzantine Empire
1331	Nikaia	Byzantine Empire
1337	Nikomedia	Byzantine Empire
1352	Demotika	Byzantine Empire, Serbian Empire
1354	Gallipoli	Byzantine Empire
1355	Ihtiman	Bulgarian Empire
1362	Adrianople	Byzantine Empire
1364	Sırpsındığı	Serbian Empire, Bulgarian Empire
1366	Gallipoli	County of Savoy
1371	Samokov	Bulgarian Empire
1371	Maritsa	Serbian Empire
1372	Sofia Valley	Bulgarian Empire
1381	Dubravnica	Moravian Serbia
1382	Sofia	Bulgarian Empire
1385	Savra	Principality of Zeta
1387	Thessalonika	Byzantine Empire
1387	Frenkyazısı	Karaman
1387	Pločnik	Moravian Serbia
1388	Bileća	Kingdom of Bosnia
1389	Kosovo	Moravian Serbia, District of Branković, Kingdom of Bosnia
1390	Philadelphia	Byzantine Empire
1391	Kırkdilim	Kadi Burhan al-Din
1393	Tarnovo	Bulgarian Empire
1394	Argeș	Principality of Wallachia
1395	Rovine	Principality of Wallachia
1395	Ohrid	Principality of Albania
1396	Nikopolis	Kingdom of Hungary, Duchy of Burgundy, Kingdom of France, Principality of Wallachia
1398	Akçay	Karaman
1402	Constantinople	Byzantine Empire
1402	Ankara	Timurid Empire, Aq Qoyunlu, Germiyan
1402	Ankara	Timurid Empire, Aq Qoyunlu, Germiyan
1402	Tripolje	Serbian Despotate
1403	Ulubad	Civil war between Mehmed Çelebi and İsa Çelebi
1408	Vidin	House of Sratsimir
1410	Kosmidion	Civil war between Süleyman Çelebi and Musa Çelebi
1410	Edirne	Civil war between Süleyman Çelebi and Musa Çelebi
1411	Constantinople	Byzantine Empire
1412	İnceğiz	Civil war between Mehmed Çelebi and Musa Çelebi
1413	Çamurlu	Civil war between Mehmed Çelebi and Musa Çelebi
1415	Doboj	Kingdom of Hungary
1416	Gallipoli	Republic of Venice
1416	Karaburun	Börklüce Mustafa
1416	Manisa	Torlak Kemal
1416	Thessalonika	Civil War between Mehmed I and Mustafa Çelebi
1420	Isaccea	Principality of Wallachia
1420	Samsun	Candar, Republic of Genoa
1421	Sazlıdere	Civil War between Murad II and Mustafa Çelebi
1422	Ulubad	Civil War between Murad II and Mustafa Çelebi
1422	Gallipoli	Civil War between Murad II and Mustafa Çelebi
1422	Constantinople	Byzantine Empire
1423	İznik	Civil War between Murad II and Mustafa Çelebi
1423	Bolu	Candar
1428	Golubac	Kingdom of Hungary, Principality of Wallachia, Grand Duchy of Lithuania
1430	Thessalonika	Byzantine Empire, Republic of Venice
1432	Shkumbin	House of Arianiti
1437	Kruševac	Kingdom of Hungary
1438	Mediaş	Kingdom of Hungary
1439	Smederevo	Serbian Despotate
1440	Belgrade	Kingdom of Hungary, Serbian Despotate
1441	Novo Brdo	Serbian Despotate, Republic of Ragusa
1441	Smederevo	Kingdom of Hungary
1442	Iron Gate	Kingdom of Hungary
1442	Ialomița	Kingdom of Hungary
1443	Nish	Kingdom of Hungary, Kingdom of Poland, Serbian Despotate
1443	Aleksinac	Kingdom of Hungary, Kingdom of Poland, Serbian Despotate
1443	Krujë	House of Kastrioti
1443	Zlatitsa	Kingdom of Hungary, Kingdom of Poland, Serbian Despotate
1443	Melstica	Kingdom of Hungary, Kingdom of Poland, Serbian Despotate
1444	Kunovica	Kingdom of Hungary, Kingdom of Poland, Serbian Despotate
1444	Torvioll	League of Lezhë
1444	Varna	Kingdom of Hungary, Kingdom of Poland, Principality of Wallachia
1445	Sava	Kingdom of Hungary
1445	Danube	Kingdom of Hungary, Principality of Wallachia
1445	Mokra	League of Lezhë
1446	Otonetë	League of Lezhë
1446	Hexamilion	Despotate of the Morea
1448	Svetigrad	League of Lezhë
1448	Oranik	League of Lezhë
1448	Kosovo	Kingdom of Hungary, Principality of Wallachia, Principality of Moldavia
1450	Krujë	League of Lezhë
1452	Modrič	League of Lezhë
1452	Meçad	League of Lezhë
1453	Polog	League of Lezhë
1453	Constantinople	Byzantine Empire
1454	Aetos	John Asen Zaccaria
1454	Ostrvica	Serbian Despotate
1454	Smederevo	Serbian Despotate
1454	Leskovac	Serbian Despotate
1454	Kruševac	Serbian Despotate, Kingdom of Hungary
1454	Sukhumi	Republic of Genoa, Principality of Abkhazia
1455	Trepča	Serbian Despotate
1455	Novo Brdo	Serbian Despotate
1455	Berat	League of Lezhë
1456	Oranik	League of Lezhë
1456	Ainos	Republic of Genoa
1456	Smederevo	Serbian Despotate
1456	Belgrade	Kingdom of Hungary, Serbian Despotate
1457	Albulena	League of Lezhë
1458	Corinth	Despotate of the Morea
1458	Užice	Kingdom of Hungary
1459	Smederevo	Serbian Despotate
1460	Pozazin	Kingdom of Hungary
1460	Kastritza	Despotate of the Morea
1460	Gardiki	Despotate of the Morea
1460	Amasra	Republic of Genoa
1461	Salmeniko	Despotate of the Morea
1461	Koyulhisar	Aq Qoyunlu
1461	Trebizond	Empire of Trebizond
1461	Giurgiu	Principality of Wallachia
1462	Danube	Principality of Wallachia
1462	Turnu	Principality of Wallachia
1462	Târgoviște	Principality of Wallachia
1462	Buzău	Principality of Wallachia
1462	Mokra	League of Lezhë
1462	Mokra	League of Lezhë
1462	Polog	League of Lezhë
1462	Livad	League of Lezhë
1462	Mytilene	Republic of Genoa
1463	Bobovac	Kingdom of Bosnia
1463	Ključ	Kingdom of Bosnia
1463	Corinth	Republic of Venice
1463	Jajce	Kingdom of Hungary, Kingdom of Croatia
1464	Mytilene	Republic of Venice
1464	Jajce	Kingdom of Hungary
1464	Mystras	Republic of Venice
1464	Ohrid	League of Lezhe
1464	Zvornik	Kingdom of Hungary
1465	Vajkal	League of Lezhë
1465	Meçad	League of Lezhë
1465	Vajkal	League of Lezhë
1465	Kashar	League of Lezhë
1465	Dağpazarı	Karaman
1466	Patras	Republic of Venice
1467	Krujë	League of Lezhë
1467	Krujë	League of Lezhë
1468	Larende	Karaman
1470	Negroponte	Republic of Venice
1472	Antalya	Republic of Venice
1472	Kıreli	Aq Qoyunlu, Karaman
1473	Erzincan	Aq Qoyunlu
1473	Malatya	Aq Qoyunlu
1473	Otlukbeli	Aq Qoyunlu
1473	Şebinkarahisar	Aq Qoyunlu
1473	Dâmbovița	Principality of Moldavia
1474	Shkodra	Republic of Venice, Principality of Zeta
1475	Vaslui	Principality of Moldavia
1475	Caffa	Republic of Genoa
1475	Theodoro	Principality of Theodoro
1476	Šabac	Kingdom of Hungary
1476	Valea Albă	Principality of Moldavia
1476	Neamț	Principality of Moldavia
1477	Smederevo	Kingdom of Hungary
1477	Isonzo	Republic of Venice
1478	Krujë	Republic of Venice, League of Lezhë
1479	Shkodra	Republic of Venice, League of Lezhë, Principality of Zeta
1479	Breadfield	Kingdom of Hungary
1480	Rhodes	Knights Hospitallers
1480	Otranto	Kingdom of Naples
1481	Râmnic	Principality of Moldavia
1481	Himarë	House of Kastrioti, Kingdom of Naples
1481	Otranto	Kingdom of Naples, Kingdom of Sicily, Kingdom of Hungary
1481	Yenişehir	Civil War between Bayezid II and Şehzade Cem
1482	Konya	Civil War between Bayezid II and Şehzade Cem
1483	Una	Kingdom of Croatia
1484	Chilia	Principality of Moldavia
1484	Akkerman	Principality of Moldavia
1485	Adana	Mamluk Sultanate
1485	Malatya	Mamluk Sultanate
1485	Cătlăbuga	Principality of Moldavia, Kingdom of Poland
1486	Șcheia	Principality of Moldavia, Kingdom of Poland
1488	Aga-Cayiri	Mamluk Sultanate
1490	Kayseri	Mamluk Sultanate
1491	Vrpile	Kingdom of Croatia
1493	Krbava	Kingdom of Croatia
1497	Cosmin Forest	Kingdom of Poland
1498	Botoșani	Principality of Moldavia
1498	Karpathos	Knights Hospitallers
1499	Zonchio	Republic of Venice
1499	Aviano	Republic of Venice
1500	Modon	Republic of Venice
1500	St. George	Republic of Venice, Spanish Empire
1501	Navarino	Republic of Venice
1501	Durrës	Republic of Venice
1501	Mytilene	Republic of Venice, Kingdom of France
1501	Valencia	Spanish Empire
1505	Trabzon	Safavid Empire
1507	Erzincan	Safavid Empire
1509	Kutaisi	Kingdom of Imereti, Principality of Guria
1510	Trabzon	Safavid Empire
1511	Çubukova	Qizilbash
1511	Tekirdağ	Civil war between Bayezid II and Şehzade Selim
1513	Yenişehir	Civil war between Selim I and Şehzade Ahmed
1513	Dubica	Kingdom of Croatia
1514	Chaldiran	Safavid Empire
1514	Tabriz	Safavid Empire
1515	Ovacık	Safavid Empire
1515	Turnadağ	Dulkadir
1515	Novigrad	Kingdom of Croatia
1516	Koçhisar	Safavid Empire
1516	Algiers	Spanish Empire, Sālim al-Tūmī
1516	Marj Dabiq	Mamluk Sultanate
1516	Aleppo	Mamluk Sultanate
1516	Damascus	Mamluk Sultanate
1516	Yaunis Khan	Mamluk Sultanate
1517	Ridaniya	Mamluk Sultanate
1517	Cairo	Mamluk Sultanate
1517	Jeddah	Portugal
1518	Jajce	Kingdom of Croatia
1518	Tlemcen	Spanish Empire, Kingdom of Tlemcen
1519	Issers	Kingdom of Kuku
1519	Algiers	Spanish Empire, Kingdom of Sicily
1520	Plješevica	Kingdom of Croatia
1520	Beirut	Kingdom of France
1521	Mastaba	Janbirdi al-Ghazali
1521	Šabac	Kingdom of Hungary
1521	Belgrade	Kingdom of Hungary
1522	Knin	Croatia
1522	Rhodes	Knights Hospitallers
1526	Mohács	Kingdom of Hungary
1528	Hungary	Habsburg Austria, Holy Roman Empire, Kingdom of Bohemia, Kingdom of Croatia, Ferdinand's Hungarian kingdom, Rascians
1529	Hungary	Habsburg Austria, Holy Roman Empire, Kingdom of Bohemia, Kingdom of Croatia, Ferdinand's Hungarian kingdom
1529	Belaj	Habsburg Monarchy, Kingdom of Croatia
1529	Buda	Habsburg Monarchy
1529	Algiers	Spanish Empire
1529	Siege of Vienna	Holy Roman Empire
1529	Formentera	Holy Roman Empire
1530	Buda	Habsburg Monarchy
1531	Ash-Shihr	Portugal
1531	Diu	Portugal
1531	Cherchell	Habsburg monarchy, Kingdom of France
1532	Kőszeg	Kingdom of Croatia
1532	Maribor	Habsburg Monarchy
1532	Leobersdorf	Habsburg monarchy, Kingdom of Hungary
1533	Kartli	Kingdom of Kartli
1534	Baghdad	Safavid Persia
1534	Tunis	Hafsid dynasty
1535	Tunis	Habsburg monarchy, Hafsid dynasty, Republic of Genoa; Kingdom of Portugal, Papal States, Knights of Malta
1537	Fortress of Klis	Kingdom of Croatia
1537	Corfu	Republic of Venice
1537	Gorjani	Holy Roman Empire
1538	Preveza	Papal Holy League
1539	Herceg Novi	Spanish Empire
1540	Girolata	Genoa, Spain
1540	Suez	Portugal
1541	Siege of Buda	Holy Roman Empire
1541	Algiers	Habsburg monarchy, Order of Saint John, Republic of Genoa, Papal States, Kingdom of Kuku
1542	Ofla	Portuguese Empire
1542	Buda	Holy Roman Empire
1543	Valpovo	Habsburg Monarchy and Kingdom of Croatia
1543	Esztergom	Holy Roman Empire
1543	Nice	Holy Roman Empire and Republic of Genoa
1543	Székesfehérvár	Holy Roman Empire
1543	Karagak	Kingdom of Imereti, Principality of Guria
1545	Sokhoista	Kingdom of Imereti, Kingdom of Kartli, Principality of Guria
1547	Guria	Principality of Guria
1548	Van	Safavid Persia
1548	Aden	Portugal
1549	Tortumi	Samtskhe-Saatabago
1551	Ardahan	Samtskhe-Saatabago
1551	Bab al-Mandab	Portugal
1551	Siege of Gozo	Order of Saint John
1551	Siege of Tripoli	Order of Saint John
1552	Ponza	Republic of Genoa
1552	Temesvár	Habsburg monarchy
1552	Eger	Hungary
1552	Muscat	Portugal
1553	Corsica	Republic of Genoa
1553	First Battle of Kalaa of the Beni Abbes (1553)	Kingdom of Beni Abbas
1553	Taza	Saadi Sultanate
1554	Conquest of Fez	Saadi Sultanate
1554	Rioni	Kingdom of Kartli
1555	Amasya	Kingdom of Imereti
1558	Mocha	Portugal
1558	Wadi al-Laban	Saadi Sultanate
1558	Mostaganem	Spanish Empire
1560	Kamaran	Portugal
1560	Battle of Djerba	Holy Roman Empire, Republic of Genoa, Papal states, Knights of Malta
1561	Brest Pokupski	Kingdom of Croatia
1565	Great Siege of Malta	Order of Saint John
1565	Bosanska Krupa	Kingdom of Croatia
1565	Ivanić-Grad	Kingdom of Croatia
1566	Siklós	Kingdom of Croatia, Kingdom of Hungary
1566	Szigetvár	Kingdom of Croatia, Kingdom of Hungary
1570	Nicosia	Republic of Venice
1570	Famagusta	Republic of Venice
1571	Moscow	Tsardom of Russia
1571	Lepanto	Holy League (Holy Roman Empire, Republic of Venice, Republic of Genoa, Papal states, Knights of Malta)
1572	Molodi	Tsardom of Russia
1574	Tunis	Spanish Empire
1576	Capture of Fez	Morocco
1578	Gvozdansko Castle	Kingdom of Croatia
1578	Ksar el Kebir	Portugal
1578	Caucasia	Safavid Persia, Kingdom of Kartli
1578	Çıldır	Safavid Persia, Kingdom of Kartli
1578	Shamakhi	Safavid Persia
1579	Tbilisi	Kingdom of Kartli, Safavid Persia
1581	Guria	Principality of Guria
1582	Guria	Principality of Guria
1582	Mukhrani	Kingdom of Kartli, Safavid Persia
1583	Georgia	Kingdom of Kartli
1583	Georgia	Kingdom of Kartli
1583	Torches (Note: The battle continued during the night, both sides using torches, hence the name.)	Safavid Persia
1584	Slunj	Kingdom of Croatia
1584	Khatisopeli	Kingdom of Kartli
1585	Gori	Kingdom of Kartli
1585	Lori	Kingdom of Kartli
1586	Aden	Portugal
1587	Akhaltsikhe	Kingdom of Kartli
1587	Tbilisi	Kingdom of Kartli
1592	Bihać	Kingdom of Croatia
1592	Brest Pokupski	Kingdom of Croatia
1593	Sisak	Holy Roman Empire, Croatia
1595	Călugăreni	Wallachia
1595	Giurgiu	Transylvania, Wallachia, Moldavia, Holy Roman Empire
1596	Brest Pokupski	Kingdom of Croatia
1596	Eger	Habsburg Monarchy
1596	Keresztes	Habsburg Monarchy
1598–1599	Gori	Kingdom of Kartli
1599	Nakhiduri	Kingdom of Kartli
1599	Șelimbăr	Wallachia
1601	Nagykanizsa	Holy Roman and many more
1601	Guruslău	Habsburg Monarchy
1601	Guria	Principality of Guria
1603	Brașov	Wallachia
1603	Nahavand	Safavid Iran, Kingdom of Kartli
1603	Tabriz	Safavid Iran, Kingdom of Kartli
1603	Erivan	Safavid Iran, Kingdom of Kartli
1603	Tbilisi	Safavid Iran, Kingdom of Kartli
1604	Urmia	Safavid Iran, Kingdom of Kartli
1604	Zeyem	Kingdom of Kartli, Safavid Iran, Kingdom of Kartli
1605	Sufiyan	Safavid Iran, Kingdom of Kartli
1605	Tabriz	Safavid Iran, Kingdom of Kartli
1606	Ganja	Safavid Iran, Kingdom of Kartli
1606–1607	Shirvan	Safavid Iran, Kingdom of Kartli
1606	Shamakhi	Safavid Iran, Kingdom of Kartli
1606	Baku	Safavid Iran, Kingdom of Kartli
1608	Niabi	Kingdom of Kartli
1609	Tashiskari	Kingdom of Kartli, Kingdom of Imereti
1610	Acıçay	Safavid Iran
1616	Erivan	Safavid Iran
1618	Tabriz	Safavid Iran
1620	Kars	Samtskhe-Saatabago
1620	Tutora	Poland–Lithuania, Moldavia
1621	Khotyn (1621)	Poland–Lithuania
1624	Baghdad	Safavid Iran
1625-1626	Baghdad	Safavid Iran
1630	Mahidasht	Safavid Iran
1630	Baghdad	Safavid Iran
1634	Abkhazia	Principality of Abkhazia
1635	Erivan	Safavid Iran
1636	Erivan	Safavid Iran
1638	Baghdad	Safavid Iran
1649	Focchies	Venice
1654	Perast	Republic of Venice
1654	Dardanelles (1654)	Venice
1655	Dardanelles (1655)	Venice
1656	Dardanelles (1656)	Venice
1657	Dardanelles (1657)	Venice
1658	Bandza	Kingdom of Imereti, Principality of Mingrelia
1663	Köbölkút	Holy Roman Empire
1663	Érsekújvár	Holy Roman Empire
1663	Zrínyiújvár	Kingdom of Croatia, Kingdom of Hungary
1663	Zrínyiújvár	Kingdom of Croatia, Kingdom of Hungary
1664	Siege of Novi Zrin	Habsburg monarchy, Kingdom of Croatia, Kingdom of Hungary, League of the Rhine
1664	Léva	Holy Roman Empire
1664	Battle of Saint Gotthard	France, Holy Roman Empire
1664	Candia	Republic of Venice, Knights of Malta, France
1673	Khotyn (1673)	Poland–Lithuania
1675	Lwów	Poland–Lithuania
1675	Trembowla	Poland–Lithuania
1676	Żurawno	Poland–Lithuania
1683	Siege of Vienna	Holy Roman Empire, Poland–Lithuania
1683	Párkány	Holy Roman Empire
1684	Vác	Holy Roman Empire
1684	Buda	Holy Roman Empire
1684	Lefkada	Republic of Venice
1685	Érsekújvár	Holy Roman Empire
1685	Eperjes	Holy Roman Empire
1685	Kassa	Holy Roman Empire
1686	Battle of Buda	Holy League, Christian Coalition
1686	Pécs	Holy Roman Empire
1687	Second Battle of Mohács	Holy Roman Empire
1687	Crimea	Tsardom of Russia
1687	Crimea	Tsardom of Russia
1688	Chalkis	Republic of Venice
1688	Belgrade	Holy Roman Empire, Bavaria
1688	Batočina	Holy Roman Empire
1689	Niš	Holy Roman Empire
1689	Crimea	Tsardom of Russia
1690	Zernest	Holy Roman Empire, Transylvania
1690	Mytilene	Republic of Venice
1690	Belgrade	Holy Roman Empire
1691	Slankamen	Holy Roman Empire
1694	Ustechko	Poland–Lithuania
1695	Oinousses Islands	Venice
1695	Azov	Tsardom of Russia
1695	Lugos	Holy Roman Empire
1696	Azov	Tsardom of Russia
1696	Andros	Venice
1696	Cenei	Holy Roman Empire
1697	Ulaş	Holy Roman Empire
1697	Zenta	Holy Roman Empire
1698	Podhajce	Polish–Lithuanian Commonwealth
1698	Samothrace	Venice
1703	Batumi	Kingdom of Imereti, Principality of Mingrelia, Principality of Guria
1703	Kakha	Kingdom of Imereti, Principality of Mingrelia, Principality of Guria
1703	Rukh	Kingdom of Imereti, Principality of Mingrelia, Principality of Guria
1703	Shorapani	Kingdom of Imereti, Principality of Mingrelia, Principality of Guria
1703	Persati	Kingdom of Imereti, Principality of Mingrelia, Principality of Guria
1703	Anaklia	Kingdom of Imereti, Principality of Mingrelia, Principality of Guria
1703	Rukh	Kingdom of Imereti, Principality of Mingrelia, Principality of Guria
1703	Baghdati	Kingdom of Imereti, Principality of Mingrelia, Principality of Guria
1711	Pruth River	Russian Empire, Kingdom of Kartli
1713	Bender	Swedish Empire
1716	Simoneti	Kingdom of Imereti
1716	Petrovaradin	Holy Roman Empire
1717	Belgrade	Holy Roman Empire
1717	Imbros	Venice
1717	Matapan	Venice, Portugal, Knights of Malta, Papal States
1723	Zedavela	Kingdom of Kartli
1724	Zedavela	Kingdom of Kakheti
1724	Ateni	Kingdom of Kakheti, Kingdom of Kartli
1726	Khoramabad	Hotaki Empire
1733	Samarra	Safavid Persia
1733	Kirkuk	Safavid Persia
1734	Magharo	Kingdom of Kakheti
1734	Baghdad	Safavid Persia
1735	Yeghevard	Safavid Persia
1737	Banja Luka	Holy Roman Empire
1739	Grocka	Holy Roman Empire
1739	Stavuchany	Russian Empire
1744	Achabeti	Givi Amilakhvari, Kingdom of Kakheti
1745	Kars	Afsharid Persia
1753	Zoti	Principality of Guria
1755	Georgia	Kingdom of Imereti
1756	Georgia	Principality of Mingrelia
1757	Khresili	Kingdom of Imereti
1758	Georgia	Kingdom of Imereti
1760	Georgia	Kingdom of Imereti
1763	Georgia	Kingdom of Imereti
1763	Georgia	Kingdom of Imereti
1764	Georgia	Kingdom of Imereti
1766	Georgia	Kingdom of Imereti
1768	Georgia	Kingdom of Imereti
1769	Şorapani	Kingdom of Imereti, Kingdom of Kartli-Kakheti, Russian Empire
1770	Sadgueri	Kingdom of Kartli-Kakheti, Russian Empire
1770	Atskuri	Kingdom of Kartli-Kakheti, Russian Empire
1770	Aspindza	Kingdom of Kartli-Kakheti, Russian Empire
1770	Kutaisi	Kingdom of Imereti, Russian Empire
1770	Chesma	Russian Empire
1770	Larga	Russian Empire
1770	Kagul	Russian Empire
1770-1771	Poti	Russian Empire, Principality of Mingrelia
1772	Saidas	Kingdom of Imereti, Russian Empire
1774	Chkheri	Kingdom of Imereti, Kingdom of Kartli-Kakheti
1774	Kozluca	Russian Empire
1774	Kerch	Russian Empire
1775	Algiers	Spanish Empire
1776	Basra	Zand Persia
1779	Rukh	Kingdom of Imereti, Principality of Guria, Principality of Mingrelia
1783	Kartli	Kingdom of Kartli-Kakheti
1784	Nachiskrevi	Kingdom of Imereti, Principality of Guria
1785	Mokhisi	Kingdom of Kartli-Kakheti, Russian Empire
1788	Sebeş	Holy Roman Empire
1789	Fokşani	Holy Roman Empire, Russian Empire
1789	Rymnik	Holy Roman Empire, Russian Empire
1790	Zovreti	Kingdom of Imereti
1790	Kerch	Russian Empire
1791	Kaliakra	Russian Empire
1798	Pyramids	France
1799	Acre	France
1799	Abukir	France
1802	Mingrelia	Principality of Mingrelia, Russian Empire
1805	Derne	United States
1805	Ivankovac	Serbian rebels
1806	Mišar	Serbian rebels
1806	Deligrad	Serbian rebels
1807	Dardanelles (1807)	United Kingdom
1807	Alexandria	United Kingdom
1807	Arpachai	Russian Empire, Principality of Mingrelia
1807	Athos	Russian Empire
1807	Akhalkalaki	Russian Empire, Kutaisi Governorate
1809	Maltakva	Russian Empire, Principality of Guria, Principality of Mingrelia, Principality of Abkhazia
1809	Čegar	Serbian rebels
1810	Sokhumi	Russian Empire, Principality of Mingrelia
1810	Batin	Russian Empire
1812	Al Safra	Emirate of Diriyah
1812	Russo-Turkish war	Russian Empire, Principality of Mingrelia, Principality of Guria, Principality of Abkhazia
1813	Jeddah	Emirate of Diriyah
1815	Ljubić	Serbian rebels
1821	Alamana	Greek rebels
1821	Dragashani	Greek rebels
1821	Erzurum	Qajar Persia
1821	Ottoman occupation of southern Iranian lands (1821)	Qajar Persia
1822	Dervenakia	Greek rebels
1822	Nauplia	Greek rebels
1822	Chios	Greek rebels
1825	Gerontas	Greek rebels
1827	Kamatero	Greek rebels
1827	Navarino	Russian Empire, United Kingdom, France
1828	Ardahan	Russian Empire, Principality of Guria
1828-1829	Akhaltsikhe	Russian Empire, Principality of Guria
1829	Kulevicha	Russian Empire
1829	Limani	Russian Empire, Principality of Guria
1830	Algiers	France
1831	Third Kosovo	Bosnia (rebels)
1832	Konya	Egypt
1832	Sürmene	Laz rebels
1833	Değirmendere	Laz rebels
1833	Trabzon	Laz rebels
1834	Trabzon	Laz rebels
1836	Najd	Emirate of Najd
1839	Nizib	Egypt
1840	Acre	Egypt
1853	Shekvetili	Russian Empire, Principality of Guria
1853	Akhaltsikhe	Russian Empire, Principality of Guria
1853	Oltenitza	Russian Empire
1853	Sinop	Russian Empire
1854	Nigoiti	Russian Empire, Principality of Mingrelia
1854	Choloki	Russian Empire, Principality of Mingrelia
1854	Silistra	Russian Empire
1854	Kurekdere	Russian Empire
1855	Enguri	Russian Empire, Kutaisi Governorate
1855	Eupatoria	Russian Empire
1877	Kızıl Tepe	Russian Empire
1877	Plevna	Russian Empire, Romania, Bulgaria (rebels)
1877	Shipka	Russian Empire, Bulgaria (rebels)
1877	Taşkesen	Russian Empire
1877–1878	Batumi	Russian Empire, Kutaisi Governorate
1878	Plevna	Russian Empire
1878	Mouzaki	Greece
1880	Ulqin	Albanian irregulars
1881	Silvova	Albanian irregulars
1881	Tunisia	France
1893	Al Wajbah	Qatar
1897	Velestino	Greece
1897	Domokos	Greece
1908	Mashkullorë	Albanian irregulars
1910	Agri Pass	Albanian rebels
1910	Kaçanik Pass	Albanian rebels
1910	Carraleva Pass	Albanian rebels
1911	Tobruk	Italy
1911	Drenogllava	Kosovo Vilayet
1912	Kunfuda	Italy
1912	Beirut	Italy
1912	Sarantaporo	Greece
1912	Yenidje	Greece
1912	Kırkkilise	Bulgaria
1912	Burgos	Bulgaria
1912	Çatalca	Bulgaria
1912–1913	Scutari	Montenegro, Serbia
1912–1913	Adrianople	Bulgaria
1912	Prilep	Serbia
1912	Sorovich	Greece
1912	Monastir	Serbia
1912	Dardanelles (1912)	Greece
1913	Lemnos	Greece
1913	Bizani	Greece
1914	Zeitun	Armenian Militia
1914	Black Sea Raid	Russian Empire
1914	Bergmann Offensive	Russian Empire
1914	Al-Faw	British Empire
1914	Basra	British Empire
1914	Qurna	British Empire
1914	Sarikamish	Russian Empire, Democratic Republic of Georgia
1914–1915	Ardahan	Russian Empire
1915	Suez Canal	British Empire
1915–1916	Gallipoli	British Empire, France
1915	Dilman	Russian Empire
1915	Van	Armenian Militia
1915	Zeitun	Armenian Militia
1915	Musa Dagh Resistance	Armenian Militia
1915	Şebinkarahisar	Armenian Militia
1915	Malazgirt	Russian Empire
1915	Kara Killisse	Russian Empire
1915	Battle of Es Sinn	British Empire
1915	Urfa Resistance	Armenian Militia
1915	Ctesiphon	British Empire
1915	Battle of Umm-at-Tubal	British Empire
1915	Kut	British Empire
1916	Battle of Sheikh Sa'ad	British Empire
1916	Erzurum	Russian Empire
1916	Battle of Koprukoy	Russian Empire
1916	Battle of Wadi	British Empire
1916	Battle of Hanna	British Empire
1916	Trabzon	Russian Empire
1916	Battle of Dujaila	British Empire
1916	Bir el Jifjafa	British Empire
1916	Katia	British Empire
1916	Mecca	Hejazi Rebels
1916	Ta'if	Hejazi Rebels
1916–1919	Medina	Hejazi Rebels
1916	Bitlis	Russian Empire
1916	Erzincan	Russian Empire
1916	Battle of Romani	British Empire
1916	Bir al-Abed	British Empire
1916–1917	Yanbu	Hejazi Rebels
1916	Battle of Magdhaba	British Empire
1917	Battle of Rafa	British Empire
1917	Hasna	British Empire
1917	Kut	British Empire
1917	Raid on Nekhl	British Empire
1917	Tell 'Asur	British Empire
1917	Baghdad	British Empire
1917	Samarra offensive	British Empire
1917	Mount Hamrin	British Empire
1917	First Battle of Gaza	British Empire
1917	Second Battle of Gaza	British Empire
1917	Istabulat	British Empire
1917	Stalemate in Southern Palestine	British Empire
1917	Aqaba	Hejazi rebels
1917	Ramadi	British Empire
1917	Wadi Musa	Hejazi Rebels
1917	al-Samn	Hejazi Rebels
1917	Tze'elim	British Empire
1917	Beersheba	British Empire
1917	Third Battle of Gaza	British Empire
1917	Battle of Tel el Khuweilfe	British Empire
1917	Battle of Hareira and Sheria	British Empire
1917	Wadi el Hesi	British Empire
1917	Huj	British Empire
1917	Battle of Mughar Ridge	British Empire
1917	Ayun Kara	British Empire
1917	Jerusalem	British Empire
1917	Nebi Samwil	British Empire
1917	Battle of El Burj	British Empire
1917	Jaffa	British Empire
1918	Jericho	British Empire
1918	Hijla	British Empire
1918	Transjordan	British Empire
1918	Khan al Baghdadi	British Empire
1918	Transjordan	British Empire
1918	Sardarabad	Armenia
1918	Bash Abaran	Armenia
1918	Vanadzor	Armenia
1918	Apollonia–Arsuf	British Empire
1918	Anaria	Transcaucasian Commissariat
1918	German Caucasus Expedition	Russian SFSR
1918	Choloki	Transcaucasian Commissariat
1918	Battle of Abu Tellul	British Empire
1918	Baku	Baku Commune
1918	Mokvi	Democratic Republic of Georgia
1918	Transjordan	British Empire
1918	Wadi Ara	France, British Empire
1918	Tabsor	British Empire
1918	Irbid	British Empire
1918	Damascus	Hejazi Rebels, British Empire
1918	Battle of Jisr Benat Yakub	British Empire
1918	Kaukab	British Empire
1918	Kiswe	British Empire, Hejazi Rebels
1918	Khan Ayash	British Empire
1918	Battle of Sharqat	British Empire
1918	Aleppo	British Empire
1918	Haritan	British Empire
1919–1920	Revolt of Ahmet Anzavur	Turkish National Movement
1919	Ardahan	Democratic Republic of Georgia
1920	Geyve	Grand National Assembly
1920	Greek Summer Offensive	Grand National Assembly

The sultans of the Ottoman Empire participated in some of the battles listed above. For those battles see List of the Ottoman battles in which the sultan participated.

== See also ==
- List of wars involving the Ottoman Empire
- List of Ottoman battles in the 20th century
- List of Ottoman battles in the World War I
- List of treaties of the Ottoman Empire
