= Battle of Manisa (1416) =

Date	1416
Location	Manisa, Turkey
Result	Ottoman victory

Belligerents
Ottoman Empire	Supporters of Sheikh Bedreddin

Commanders and leaders
(Ottoman Empire) Bayezid Pasha (Ottoman Empire) Şehzade Murad	Torlak Kemal (executed)

Strength
Unknown	3,000–5,000

Casualties and losses
Unknown	3,000

The Battle of Manisa, the second rebellion started by the supporters of Sheikh Bedreddin was suppressed by Prince Murad in Manisa.

== Background ==
After Prince Murad defeated Börklüce Mustafa in Battle of Karaburun, the other revolt was to be launched in Manisa by Torlak Kemal, who had gathered 3,000–5,000 men around him.

The second uprising of Sheikh Bedreddin’s disciples was again initiated by his close follower, Torlak Kemal, who was of Jewish origin.

== Battle ==
The execution of Börklüce Mustafa in front of his disciples led to the spread of rumors that he had attained immortality. Stories that he had been resurrected and was hiding in the forests of the island of Samos spread throughout the country. This rebellious community, which confused imagination with reality, did not disperse even after the death of their leader. After Prince Murad left Manisa, 3,000 dervishes exhumed the body of Börklüce Mustafa. Prince Murad immediately returned, but the vast plane-tree forests prevented the uprising from being quickly suppressed. Nevertheless, Torlak Kemal was defeated by Prince Murad and Bayezid Pasha; he and one of his most loyal companions, who had led the revolt, were executed by hanging. The 3,000 dervishes with them were also hanged from the plane trees.
