= List of Ottoman battles in which the sultan participated =

The List of Ottoman Battles In Which The Sultans Participated In is shown below. Note that the sieges are not included in the list. For a complete list of all battles involving the Ottoman Empire see the List of battles involving the Ottoman Empire.

Date	Name	Sultan	Opponents	Commanders of the opponents		
27 July 1302	Bapheus (Koyunhisar)	Osman I	Byzantine Empire	Mouzalon		
1303	Battle of Dimbos	Osman I	Byzantine Empire			
11 June 1329	Maltepe (Pelakonon)	Orhan	Byzantine Empire	Andronicus III		
15 June 1389	Kosovo	Murad I	Principality of Serbia-Kingdom of Bosnia	Prince Lazar		
17 May 1395	Rovine (Arkuş)	Beyazit I	Wallachia	Mircea cel Bătrân		
25 September 1396	Nicopolis (Niğbolu)	Beyazıt I	Crusades	Sigismund		
20 July 1402	Ankara	Beyazıt I	Timurid Empire	Timur		
10 November 1444	Varna	Murat II	Crusades	Władysław III -John Hunyadi		
20 October 1448	Kosovo	Murat II	Kingdom of Hungary–Wallachia	John Hunyadi	Crusades	Władysław III -John Hunyadi
20 October 1448	Kosovo	Mehmed II	Kingdom of Hungary–Wallachia	John Hunyadi		
1454	Ostrvica	Mehmed II	Serbian Despotate	Durad Brankovic		
1458 Autumn	Tahtalu	Mehmed II	Kingdom of Hungary-Serbian Despotate	Matthias Corvinus		
1461	Koyulhisar	Mehmed II	Aq Qoyunlu	Yusufca Mirza		
1462	Târgoviște	Mehmed II	Wallachia	Vlad Dracul		
1463	Kljuc	Mehmed II	Kingdom of Hungary-Kingdom of Bosnia	Stephen Tomasevic		
1464	Zvornik	Mehmed II	Kingdom of Hungary	Matthias Corvinus		
11 August 1473	Otlukbeli	Mehmet II	Akkoyunlu Turkmens	Uzun Hasan		
26 July 1476	Valea Albă (Akdere)	Mehmet II	Moldavia	Ștefan cel Mare		
1505	Trabzon	Selim I	Safavid Persia	Ebrahim		
1507	Erzincan	Selim I	Safavid Persia	Ismail I		
1510	Trabzon	Selim I	Safavid Persia	Ebrahim		
23 August 1514	Chaldiran (Çaldıran)	Selim I	Safavid Persia	Ismail I		
24 August 1516	Marj Dabiq (Mercibabık)	Selim I	Mamluk Egypt	Qansuh al Ghawri		
22 January 1517	Ridaniya	Selim I	Mamluk Egypt	Tuman bay II.		
29 August 1526	Mohacs	Süleyman I	Kingdom of Hungary	Louis II of Hungary		
21 August 1541	Buda	Suleyman I	Holy Roman Empire-Habsburg Austria	Wilhelm von Roggendorf		
26 October 1596	Keresztes (Haçova)	Mehmet III	Holy Roman Empire-Habsburg Austria	Maximilian III, Archduke of Austria		
21 September 1695	Lugos	Mustafa II	Habsburg Austria	Federico Veterani		
26 August 1696	Olasch	Mustafa II	Holy Roman Empire-Habsburg Austria	Augustus II the Strong		
11 September 1697	Zenta	Mustafa II	Holy Roman Empire-Habsburg Austria	Prince Eugene of Savoy		

== Image gallery of the sultans ==
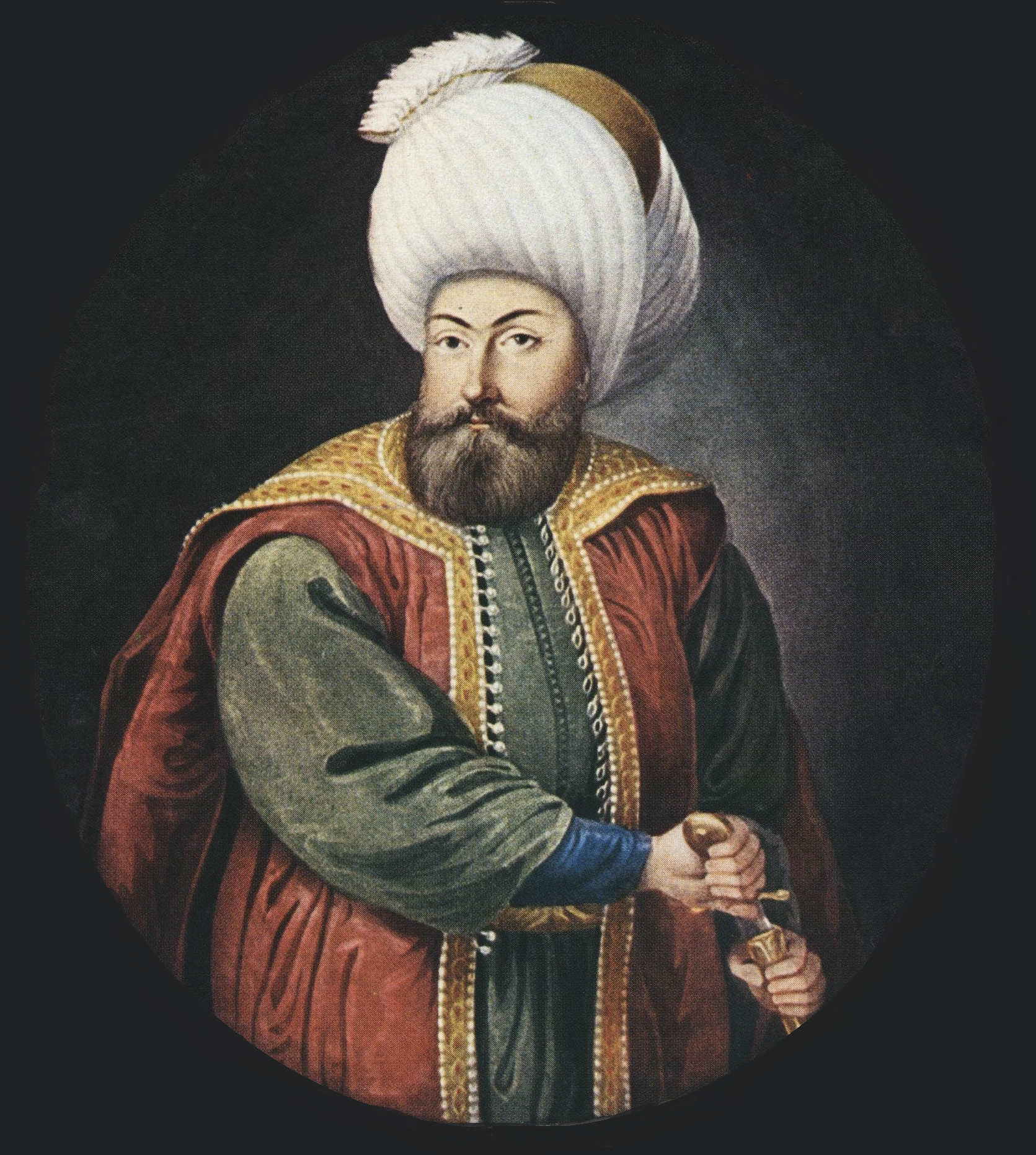
Osman I (Osman Gazi)
1299-1324

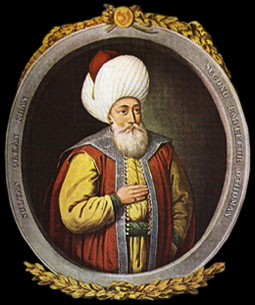
Orhan (Orhan Gazi)
1324-1361

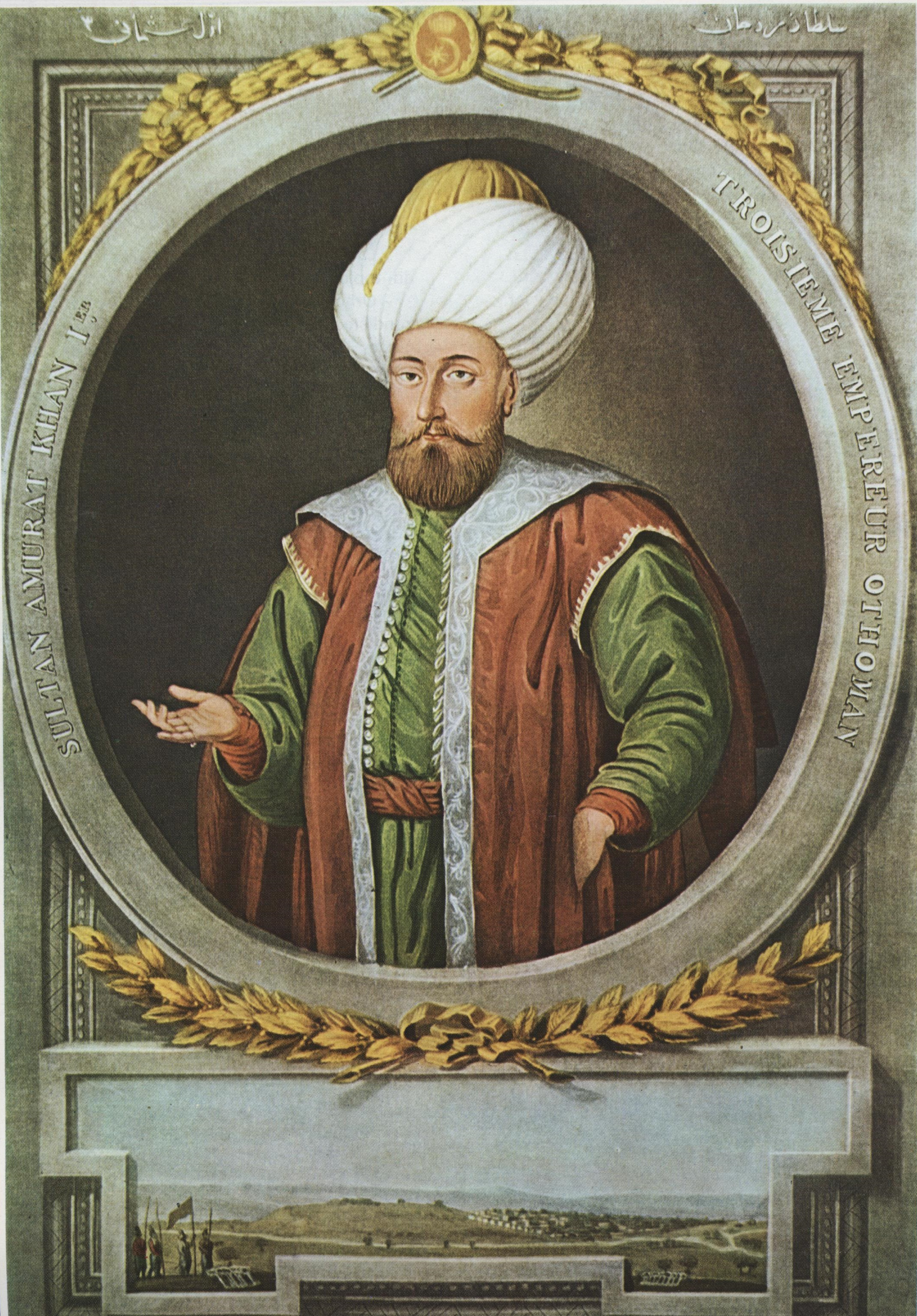
Murat I (Hüdavendigar)
1361-1389

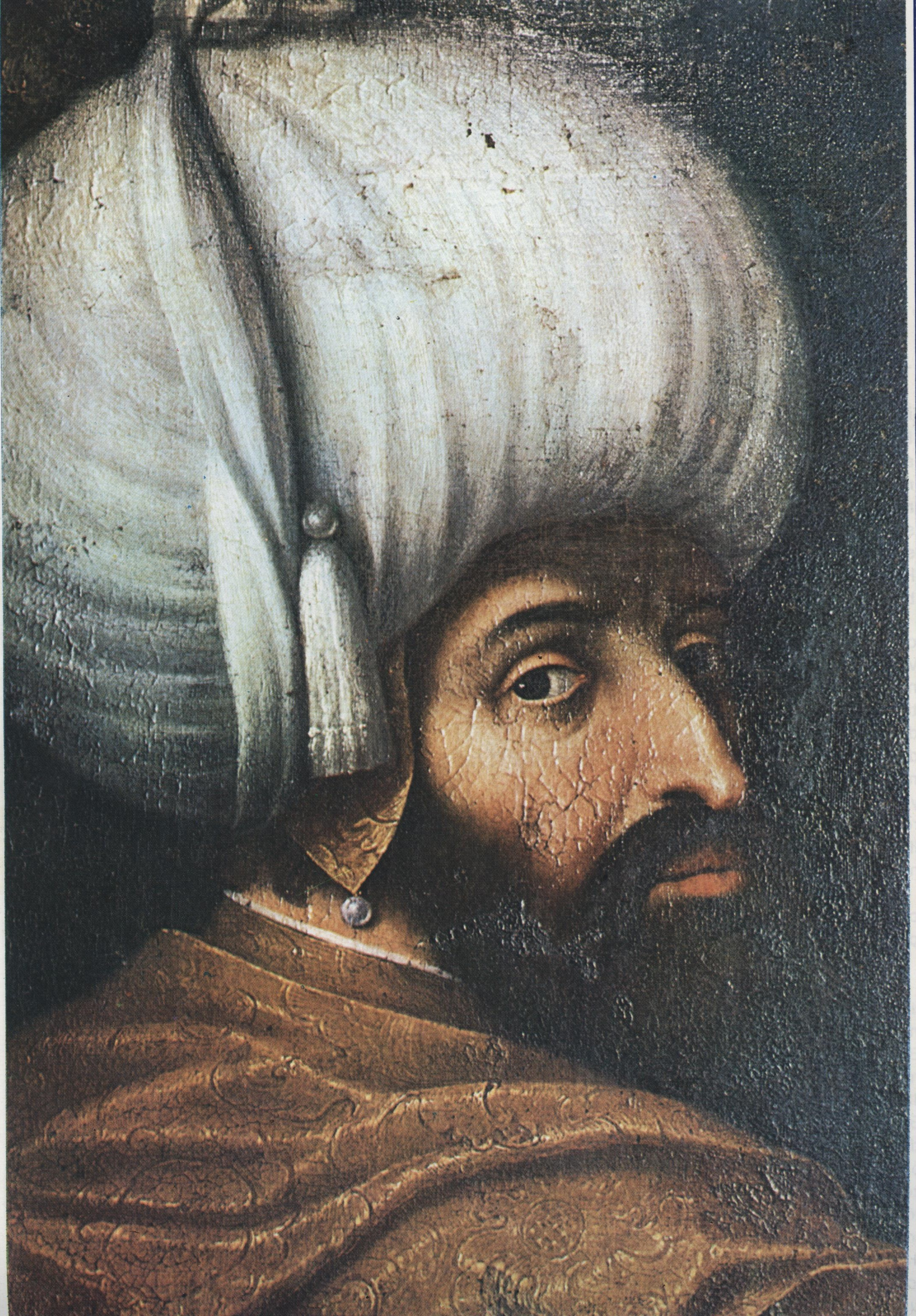
Beyazıt I (Yıldırım)
1389-1402

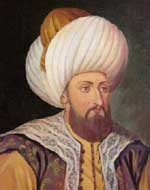
Murat II
1421-1451

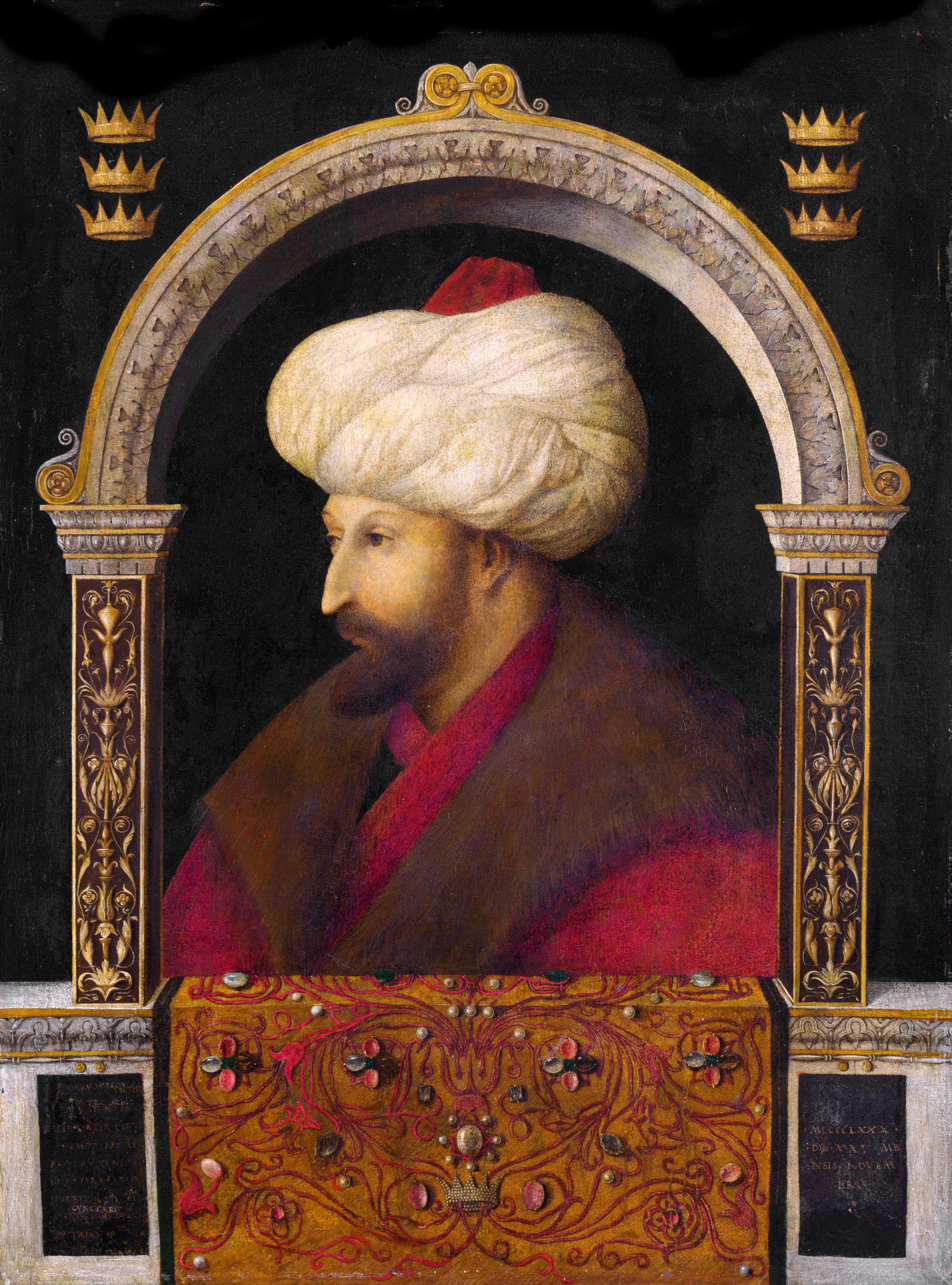
Mehmet II (Fatih)
1451-1481

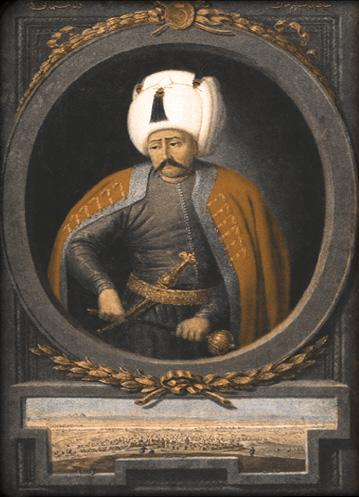
Selim I (Yavuz)
1512-1520

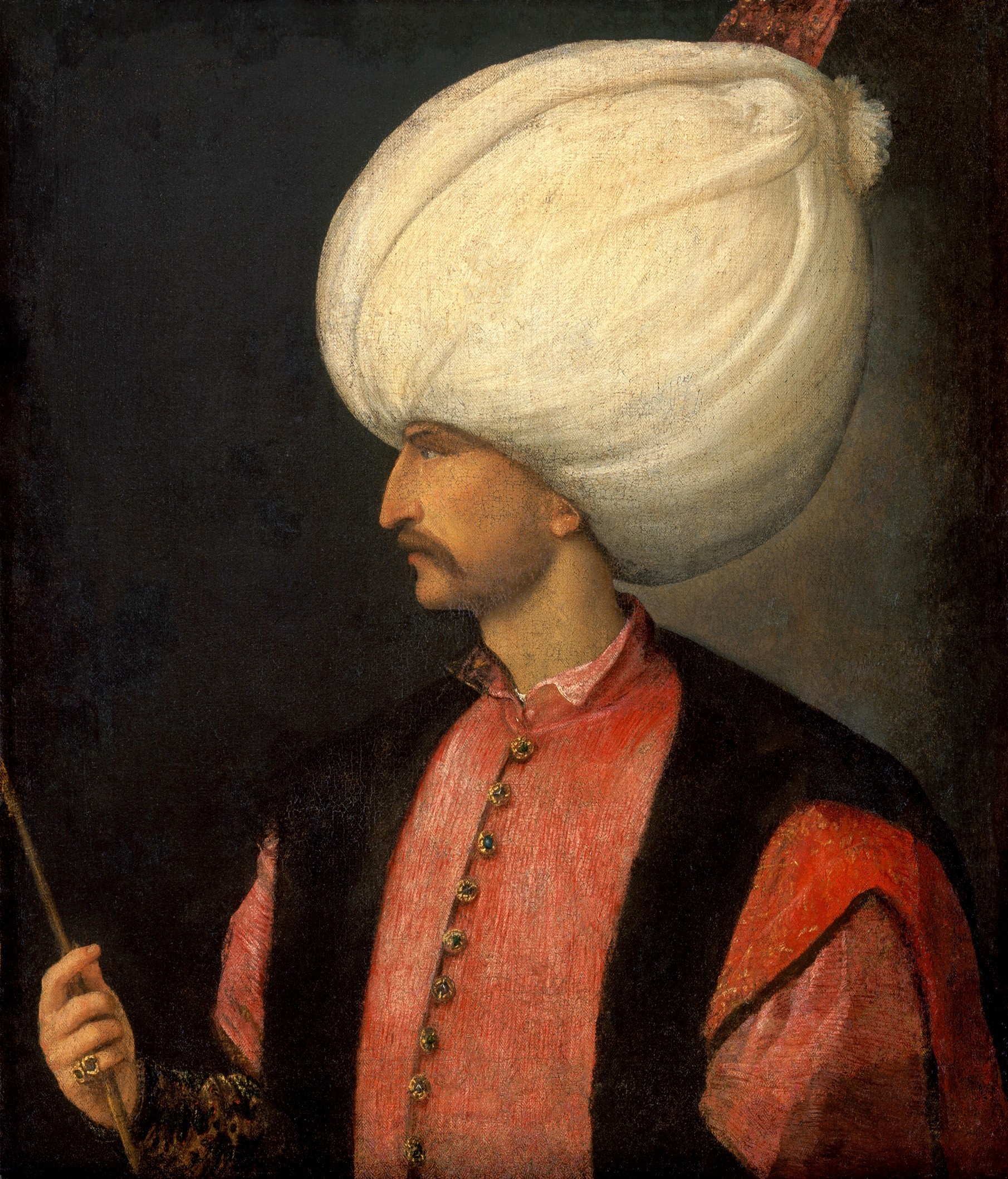
Süleyman I (Kanuni)
1520-1566

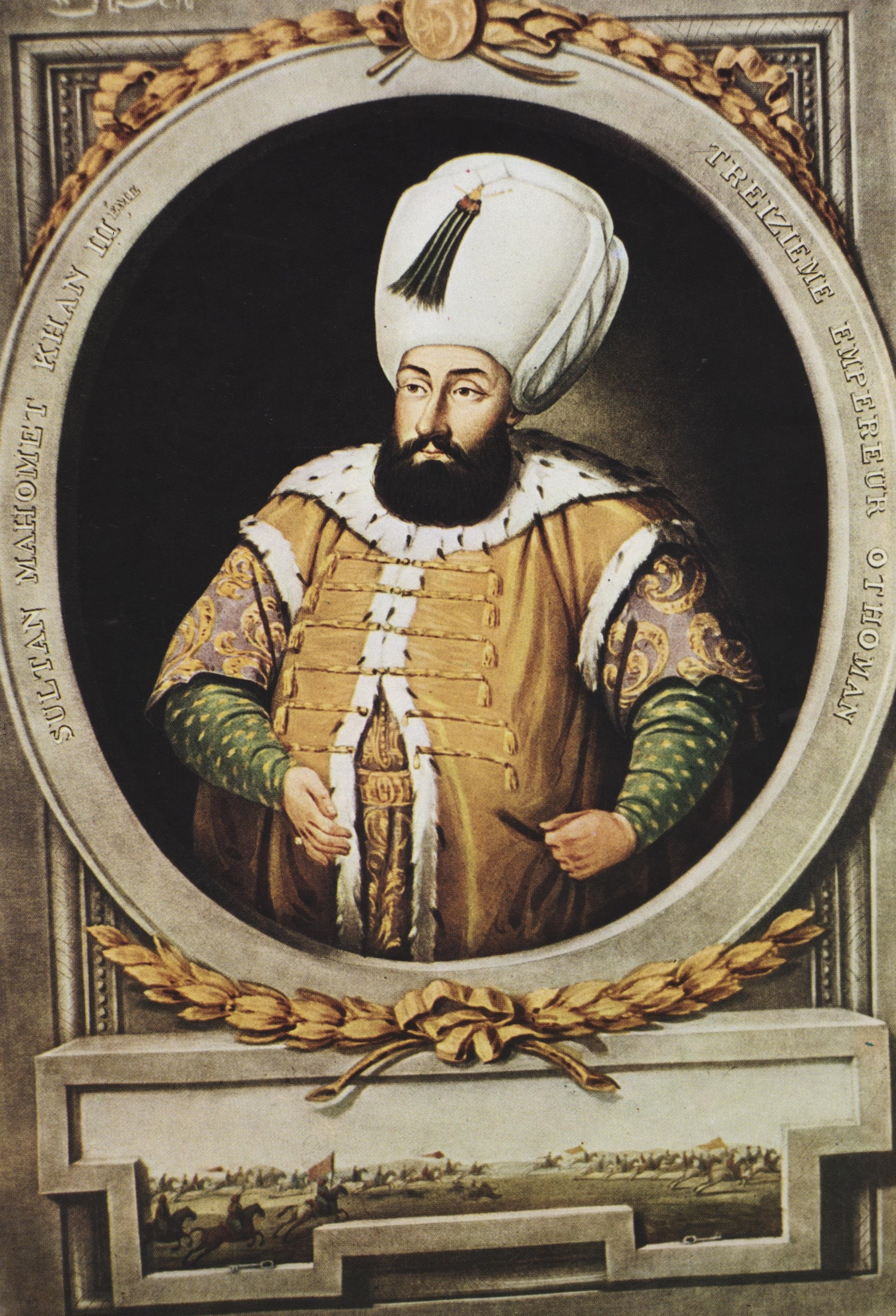
Mehmet III
1595-1603

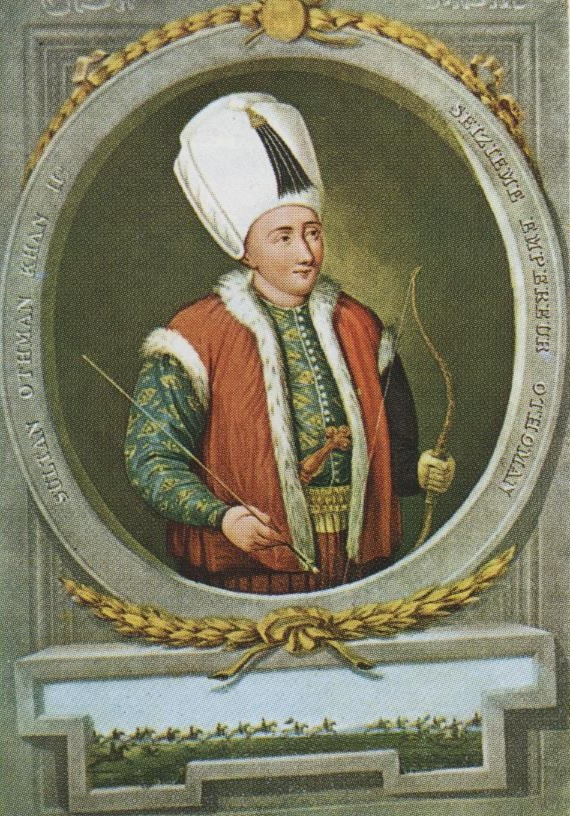
Osman II
1618-1622

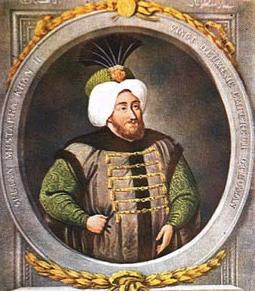
Mustafa II
1695-1703

== Sources ==
- Prof. Yaşar Yüce-Prof. Ali Sevim: Türkiye tarihi Cilt II, AKDTYKTTK Yayınları, İstanbul, 1991
- Prof. Yaşar Yüce-Prof. Ali Sevim: Türkiye tarihi Cilt III, AKDTYKTTK Yayınları, İstanbul, 1991
- Gabor Agoston-Bruce Masters:Encyclopaedia of the Ottoman Empire ISBN 978-0-8160-6259-1
- Nicolae Iorga:Geschiste des Osmanischen Reiches II (translated by Nilüfer Epçeli) Yeditepe yayınevi, İstanbul, ISBN 975-6480-19-X
- Encyclopædia Britannica, Expo'70 ed. Vol 22
