= Trabzon Expedition (1505) =

- Part of Ottoman–Persian War (1505–1517)
Date	1505
Location	Trabzon, Turkey
Result	Ottoman victory

Belligerents
Ottoman Empire	Safavid Iran

Commanders and leaders
(Ottoman Empire) Şehzade Selim	Ebrahim Mirza

Strength
450 men	3,000 men

The Trabzon Expedition was a military expedition undertaken by Selim against the Safavids, following the attack on Trabzon by Shah Ismail's brother Ebrahim Mirza in 1505.

== Battle ==
Ebrahim Mirza, the brother of Shah Ismail, set out with an army of 3,000 men to plunder the province held by Selim. With only 450 soldiers, Selim repelled the Safavids, pursued them as far as Erzincan, slaughtered many of them, and seized their weapons and ammunition. Selim subsequently dispatched a separate force to raid the western territories of the Safavids. Following the conflict of 1505, Shah Ismail sent an envoy to Bayezid II to complain about Selim's excessively aggressive raids and to demand the return of the weapons belonging to the soldiers Selim had captured. Bayezid II did not return the weapons but sent the envoy back with gifts and promises of friendship. Selim fought against the Safavids again in 1507 and defeated Safavid forces in 1510.
