= Lower-Sava campaign =

1445 attack on Turkish camp in Serbia

Lower-Sava campaign (1445)
- Part of the Hungarian–Ottoman Wars
Date	February 1445
Location	Sava river, Serbia
Result	Hungarian victory; The Turkish camp was looted

Belligerents
Kingdom of Hungary	Ottoman Empire

Commanders and leaders
John Hunyadi	Unknown

Strength
Unknown	More than the Hungarians

Casualties and losses
Unknown	Heavy or Entire army killed

The Lower-Sava campaign was a 1445 night-time attack by John Hunyadi in the lower parts of the Sava river on a Turkish raiding force.

== Background ==
After the disastrous defeat at the Battle of Varna, Sultan Murad II launched a raiding force deep into Serbian territory. When John Hunyadi found out about this, he quickly assembled an army of his own in order to deal with the threat.

== Battle ==
Ottoman Campaigns of John Hunyadi, 1440–1456

Hunyadi made camp right in front of the Ottoman army who had their own camp near the river side 1 mile away from Belgrade. Hunyadi silently approached the Ottoman's camp and began to slaughter every single soldier in sight. Some sources state that a few Ottomans had managed to escape while other sources say that the Ottomans were cut down to the last men.

== Aftermath ==
After the "battle" which was more like an ambush, Hunyadi had no time to return home since the Counts of Celje had made some incursions into the Kingdom of Croatia which was in a personal union with Hungary at the time.

== See also ==
- Akinji
- Battle of Varna
- Sultan Murad
