= Battle of Gallipoli (1422) =

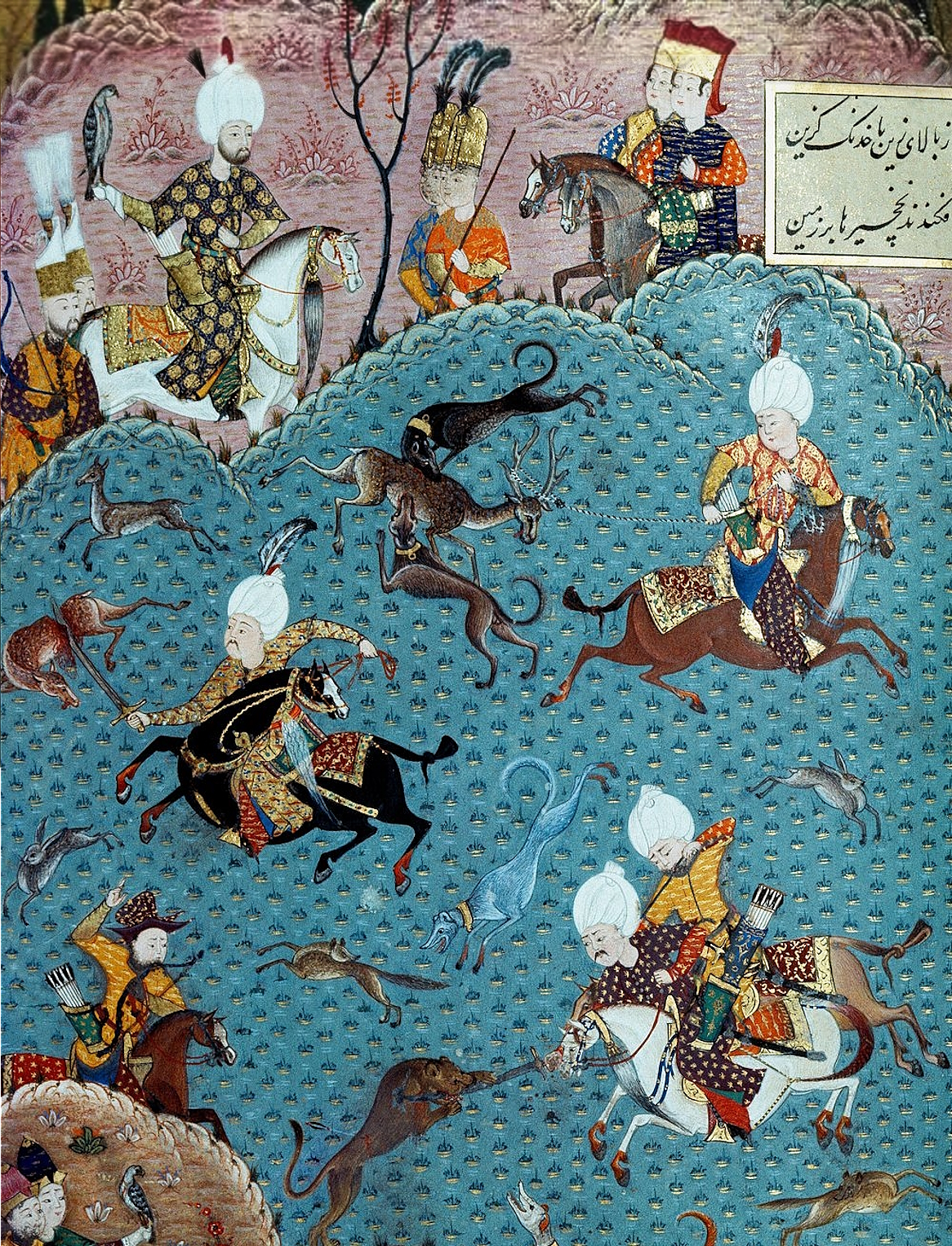
- Murad II is hunting with his army.
Date	1422
Location	Gallipoli, Turkey
Result	Victory for Murad II

Belligerents
Ottoman Empire supported by: Republic of Genoa	(Ottoman Empire) Forces of Mustafa Çelebi

Commanders and leaders
(Ottoman Empire) Murad II (Genoa) Giovanni Adorno	(Ottoman Empire) Mustafa Çelebi (executed)

Strength
3,500 in total (3,000 Ottoman Trops, 500 Genoese Trops); 7 warships 20 small fleets	Unknown

Casualties and losses
Unknown	Heavy

The Battle of Gallipoli was the last battle that took place during Mustafa Çelebi's second rebellion.

== After the battle ==
After achieving victory easily at Ulubad, Murad II’s first task was to reorganize his army, and at the same time he quickly rebuilt what he had previously ordered to be demolished. Then, without wasting time, he set out to cross into Rumelia. He wanted to finish off Mustafa Çelebi before he could recover and regroup. When he arrived in Lapseki, he could not find any naval vessels to transport his soldiers to Rumelia, because Mustafa Çelebi had taken the available ships on the Anatolian side across and had them pulled ashore there.

== Passage to Gallipoli ==
Murad had sent one of his men to Adorno, the Podestà of New Phocaea. Adorno was waiting for the sultan between Gallipoli and Lapseki with a fleet composed of seven warships. Sultan Murad chose the largest of the ships and boarded it together with his 500-man unit. When the Genoese fleet reached the middle of the strait, Adorno fell at the sultan’s feet and asked for forgiveness of the tax he owed. Upon this request, the sultan agreed. Meanwhile, Mustafa Çelebi saw from the walls of Gallipoli that the Genoese ships were approaching one after another with their sails full. Mustafa sent one of his men to Adorno, offering him a bribe of 50,000 ducats in exchange for the surrender of Sultan Murad. However, Adorno refused. When Sultan Murad learned of this situation, he was deeply moved and declared Adorno a true friend.

== Battle ==
Meanwhile, Mustafa Çelebi had gathered his soldiers at the port of Gallipoli, where they were defending the harbor against the ships, trying to prevent them from landing. Adorno dropped anchor on the lower side of the city, a short distance from the port, and began disembarking his troops. Twenty small ships landed about 500 Genoese soldiers on the shore. After that, Sultan Murad came ashore with his 3,000 picked troops. When these forces began to rain arrows and stones upon the defenders with their slings and bows, Mustafa’s soldiers scattered and fled. Faced with this situation, Mustafa himself also fled toward Edirne.

== Mustafa's death ==
Murad pursued him and arrived in Edirne. He sent a group of soldiers after him. They caught up with Mustafa at a place called Kızılağaç. However, before Murad’s men reached him, Mustafa’s own followers bound his hands and feet and handed him over to Murad’s troops. They took Mustafa before Murad. The sultan ordered him to be hanged on the walls of Edirne.
