= Crimean Campaign (1475) =

Part of the Ottoman wars in Europe

- Part of Ottoman wars in Europe
- Crimean peninsula before the campaign
Date	1475
Location	Kaffa, Crimean Peninsula
Result	Ottoman–Crimean victory
Territorial changes	Ottoman Empire annexed Kerch, Kaffa, Azov, Mangup, Crimean Khanate becomes an Ottoman vassal in 1478

Belligerents
Genoa; Theodoro	Ottoman Empire; Crimean Khanate

Commanders and leaders
Alexander of Theodoro (executed)	Gedik Ahmed Pasha (Crimean Khanate) Meñli I Giray

Strength
2,250–3,000; 2,000–3,000 Genoese; 250–300 Theodoro	5,000–10,000; 200 ships

The Crimean Expedition in 1475 (Note: Turkish: Kırım Seferi 1475), orchestrated under the command of Gedik Ahmed Pasha, stands as a pivotal naval campaign conducted by the Ottoman navy in 1475. Its primary objective was the seizure of the Genoese colonies nestled within Crimea, thereby asserting Ottoman authority over the region and placing the Crimean Khanate under Ottoman protection.

== Background ==
Following the momentous Conquest of Constantinople in 1453, Sultan Mehmed II strategically prioritized the consolidation of Ottoman control along the Black Sea coastline. This vision materialized through a series of conquests, notably the vassalization of the Principality of Moldavia in 1454, followed by the annexation of Amasra in 1459, Sinop, and the Greek Empire of Trebizond in 1461. However, despite these territorial gains, Crimea remained a coveted prize due to its strategic location along vital trade routes, predominantly controlled by the Genoese. Despite earlier Ottoman naval forays aimed at bolstering influence, such as expeditions against the Genoese stronghold of Kaffa in 1454 and 1469, the Genoese continued to wield considerable influence in Crimean affairs.

The year 1469 marked a turning point as tensions escalated following the Ottoman navy's incursion, led by Yakup Bey, resulting in the plunder of Genoese settlements and the capture of men loyal to Menli Giray, the Khan of Crimea. This incited a rift between Mehmed II and Menli Giray, the latter being perceived as an unfavorable candidate for the Crimean throne by Mehmed. Concurrently, the Genoese, though reducing their annual tribute, escalated their involvement in Crimean politics. Notably, their dismissal of Eminek Bey, suspected of Ottoman sympathies, ignited a rebellion against Menli Giray, prompting Mehmed II to conceive a military intervention in Crimea.

== Campaign ==
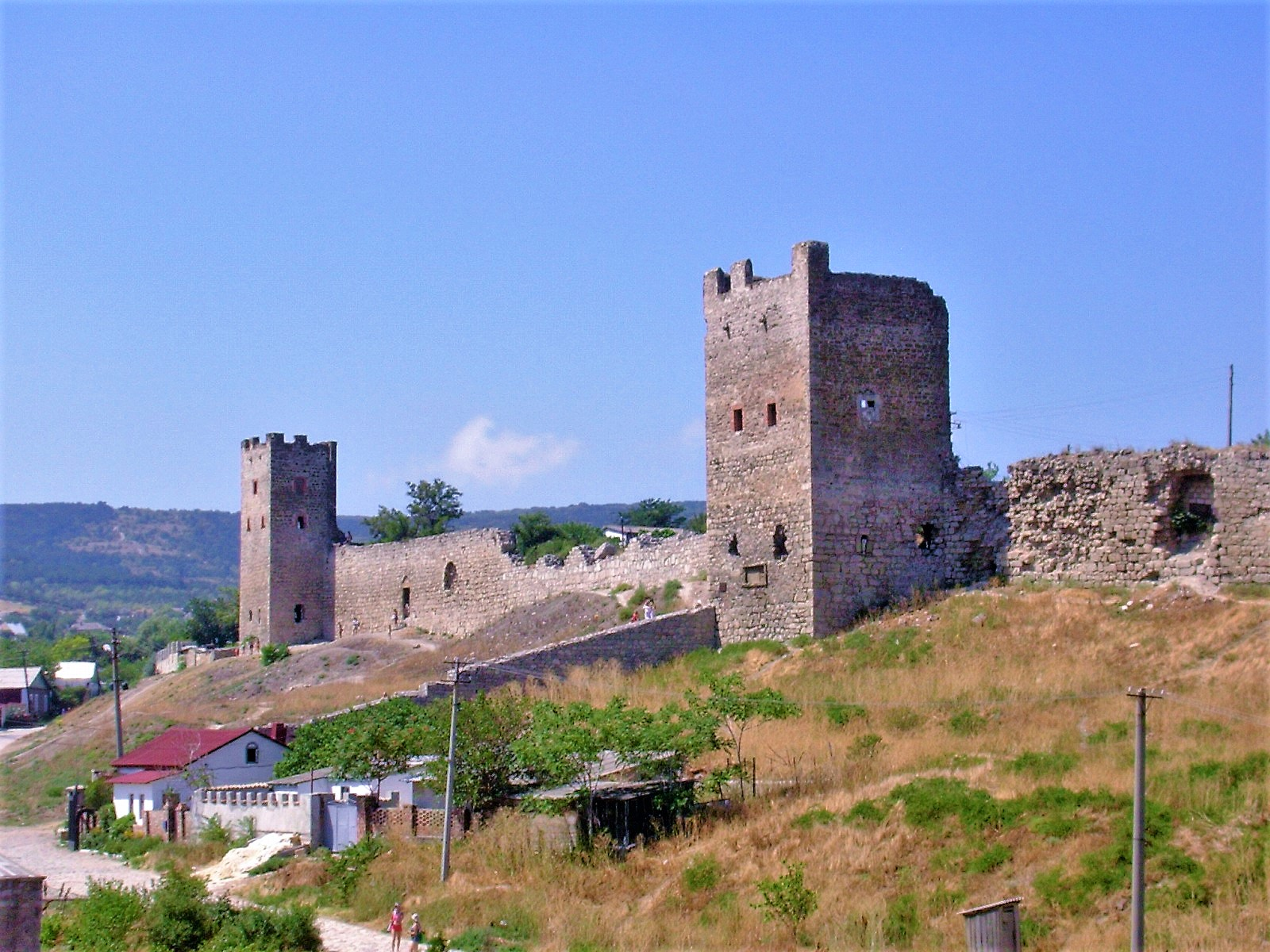
Caffa castle

In the summer of 1475, Mehmed II dispatched the Rumelian army, led by Hadım Suleiman Pasha, to engage the Moldavian Principality while concurrently deploying the Ottoman fleet, under the command of Gedik Ahmed Pasha, to confront the Genoese presence in Crimea. A fleet comprising approximately 200 ships, alongside transport vessels, embarked on the expedition and landed on the Crimean peninsula in early June. Despite initial attempts at peaceful negotiations for the surrender of the castle of Caffa, Turkish forces, under Gedik Ahmed Pasha, resorted to a siege when their entreaties were rebuffed. The castle ultimately capitulated on June 9, following pressure exerted on the Genoese tekfur, the castle's garrison commander. This marked a significant victory as Turkish troops entered and secured the fortress.

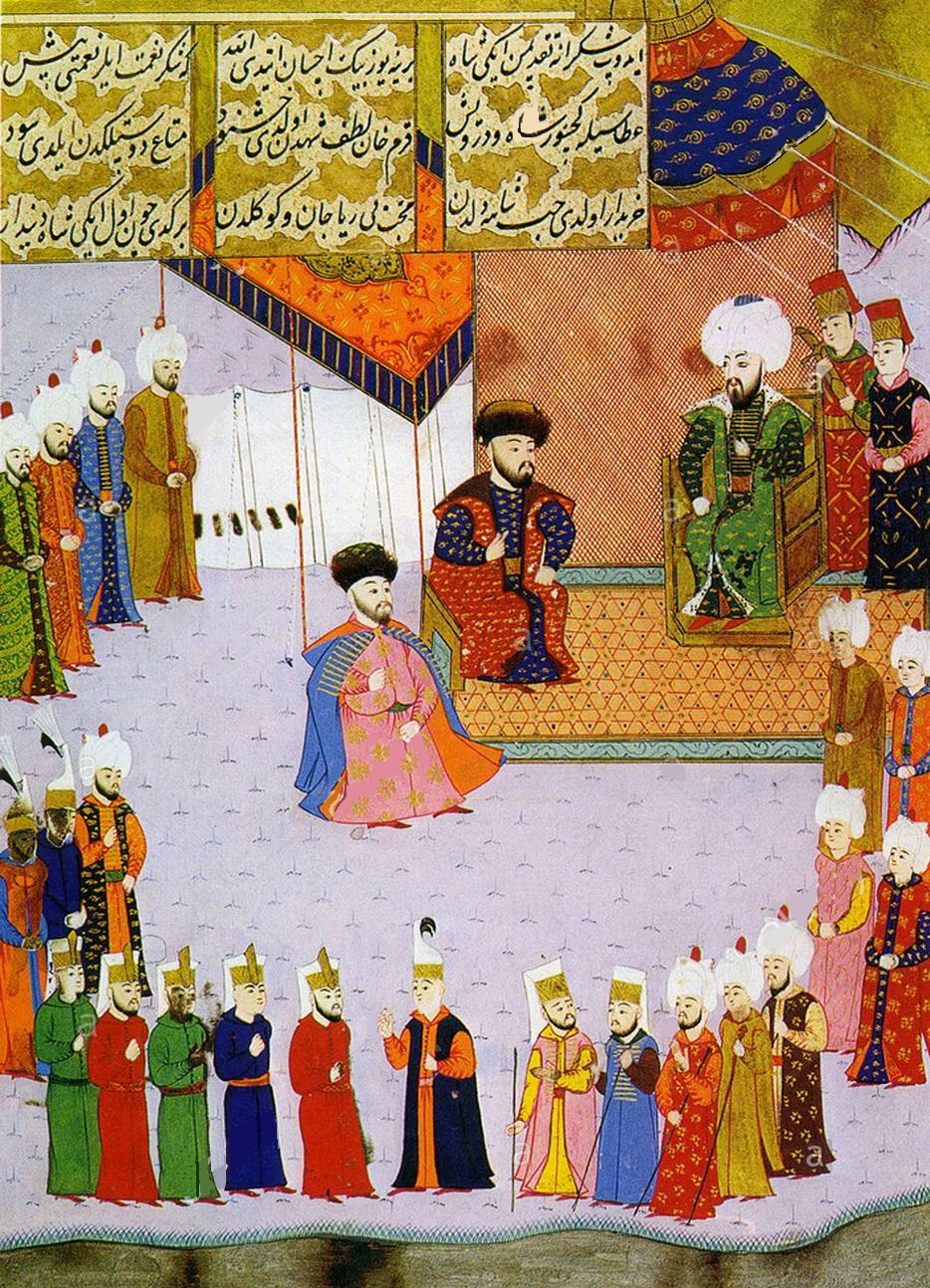
Menli I Giray and Bayezid II

Subsequent to the capture of Caffa, Gedik Ahmed Pasha facilitated the release of Menli Giray from Genoese captivity and forged a treaty establishing Ottoman protectorate over the Crimean Khanate. The Ottoman navy swiftly expanded its conquests, capturing strategic strongholds such as Caffa, Sudak, Kerch, and Azov, effectively dismantling Genoese dominance in Crimea.

== Aftermath ==
The Crimean Expedition of 1475 emerged as a watershed moment, representing the Ottoman navy's second major overseas military endeavor following the Siege of Negroponte in 1470. This triumph solidified Ottoman hegemony over Crimea and secured control over crucial Northern Black Sea trade routes. Furthermore, the Crimean Khanate's integration into the Ottoman protectorate heralded a transformative shift in regional geopolitics, granting the Khanate strategic leverage over neighboring adversaries while affording the Ottoman Empire an avenue to extend its influence through proxy intervention.

== See also ==
- Mengli I Giray
- Gedik Ahmed Pasha
- Siege of Negroponte (1470)

== Sources ==
- Nur Akbaş, Gedik Ahmed Pasha's Crimean Expedition According to Ottoman Sources, International Journal of Historical Studies ISBN 214995351X
- Âşık Paşazâde, History of the Ottomans ISBN 9754284954
- Alexander A. Vasiliev, The Goths in the Crimea ISBN 091095609X
- Selahattin Tansel, Sultan the Conqueror Mehmet's Political and Military Activities, Istanbul 1999
- Encyclopedia of Islam, Gedik Ahmed Pasha, Turkish Religious Foundation 1996
