= Battle of Karaburun =

Date	1416
Location	Karaburun, İzmir, Turkey
Result	Ottoman victory

Belligerents
Ottoman Empire	Supporters of Sheikh Bedreddin

Commanders and leaders
(Ottoman Empire) Bayezid Pasha (Ottoman Empire) Şehzade Murad	Börklüce Mustafa (executed)

Strength
Unknown	10,000

Casualties and losses
Unknown	8,000

The Battle of Karaburun was a battle fought between the rebels who supported Sheikh Bedreddin and the Ottoman army.

== Battle ==
The number of men gathered around Börklüce Mustafa, who had settled in Karaburun near İzmir, increased rapidly. Börklüce Mustafa was one of Sheikh Bedreddin's most powerful disciples.

While Mehmed I was occupied with the Balkans, he learned that Börklüce Mustafa had rebelled. Thereupon, he sent word to his son, Şehzade Murad, who was in Amasya, instructing him to eliminate the problem. Şehzade Murad, together with Bayezid Pasha, marched against Börklüce Mustafa.

Börklüce Mustafa had gathered 10,000 soldiers around him, consisting of both cavalry and infantry. Şehzade Murad confronted him in a place called Karaburun and, after a fierce battle, defeated him. Mustafa and the rebels lost 8,000 soldiers. Börklüce Mustafa himself was captured, taken to Ayasuluğ, subjected to various forms of torture, and finally executed.
