= Capture of Damascus (1516) =

1516 Ottoman capture of Damascus

- Part of Ottoman–Mamluk War (1516–1517)
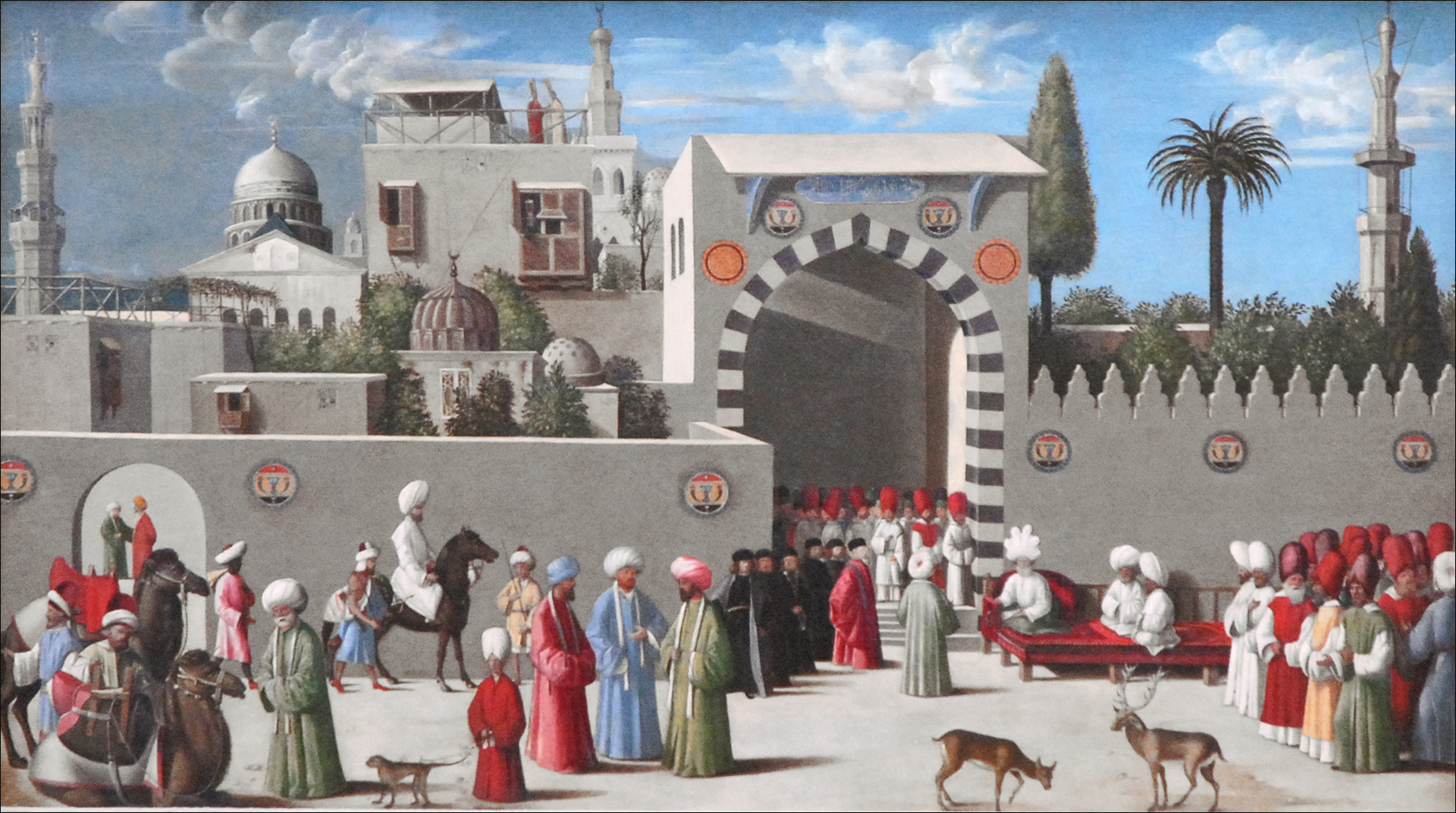
- Damascus at the beginning of the 16th century (c. 1511)
Date	27 September – 3 October 1516
Location	Damascus
Result	Ottoman victory
Territorial changes	Damascus and Lebanon annexed by the Ottoman Empire

Belligerents
Ottoman Empire	Mamluk Sultanate

Commanders and leaders
(Ottoman Empire) Selim I	Nasireddin Bey (surrendered)

The Capture of Damascus was a phase of the Ottoman–Mamluk War (1516–1517). After defeating the Mamluk army under Qansuh al-Ghawri at the Battle of Marj Dabiq on 24 August 1516, the Ottoman army under Selim I continued its advance and reached the outskirts of Damascus on 27 September 1516, entering the city center on 3 October.

== Campaign and establishment of Ottoman rule in Damascus ==
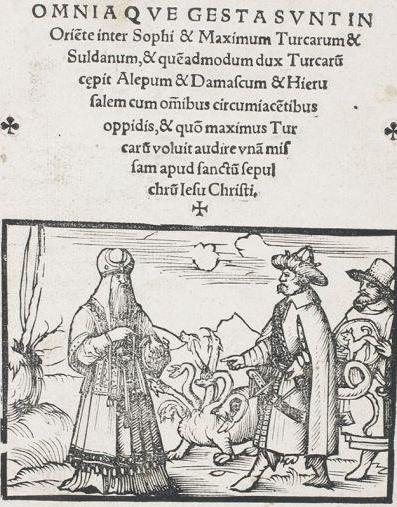
An illustration of the Ottoman–Mamluk War

The Ottoman army under Selim I departed from Aleppo on 15 September 1516 and marched toward Damascus. On 19 September, they received the surrender of Hama, and on 21 September, Homs. The Mamluk beys, having convened in Damascus to choose a new Sultan after the death of Qansuh al-Ghawri at Marj Dabiq, dispersed without decision on 22 September and left for Cairo. The Ottoman army continued its advance and reached Mastaba, on the outskirts of Damascus, by late September. The Mamluk emir of Damascus, Nasireddin, surrendered under the persuasion of Hayır Bey, who had defected to the Ottomans. On 3 October 1516, the Ottoman army entered the city center. At Kasr al-Ablak, commanders of various Mamluk fortresses in Syria, Arab emirs, and Druze leaders from Lebanon pledged allegiance to Selim. Selim appointed Iskenderpashazade Mustafa Bey to Tripoli (Lebanon), Evrenosoğlu to Jerusalem, and Mustansiroğlu to Safed as sanjak-beys. Ibn al-Hanash was appointed leader of the Druze. İsabeyzade Mehmed Bey was dispatched with 2,000 cavalry toward Gaza Strip. Selim remained in Damascus for two and a half months during the winter of 1516–1517. During his stay, he established Ottoman administration and restored damaged sites, including the tomb of Ibn Arabi.

== Diplomatic efforts ==
Upon learning that Tuman Bay II had ascended to the Mamluk throne, Selim I sent envoys from Damascus with a nâme-i hümâyûn (imperial letter), offering to recognize him as Sultan if he agreed to have the khutbah read in Selim's name and coinage minted under Selim's authority. Selim advised against further bloodshed among Muslims and cited the fate of Qansuh al-Ghawri as a warning. However, when the Ottoman envoys were killed upon their arrival in Cairo, further war became inevitable. On 15 December 1516, Selim resumed his campaign and marched toward Cairo.

== See also ==
- Battle of Khan Yunis
- Battle of Ridaniya
