= Fall of Durrës =

Fall of Durrës (1501)
- Part of Ottoman–Venetian War (1499–1503)
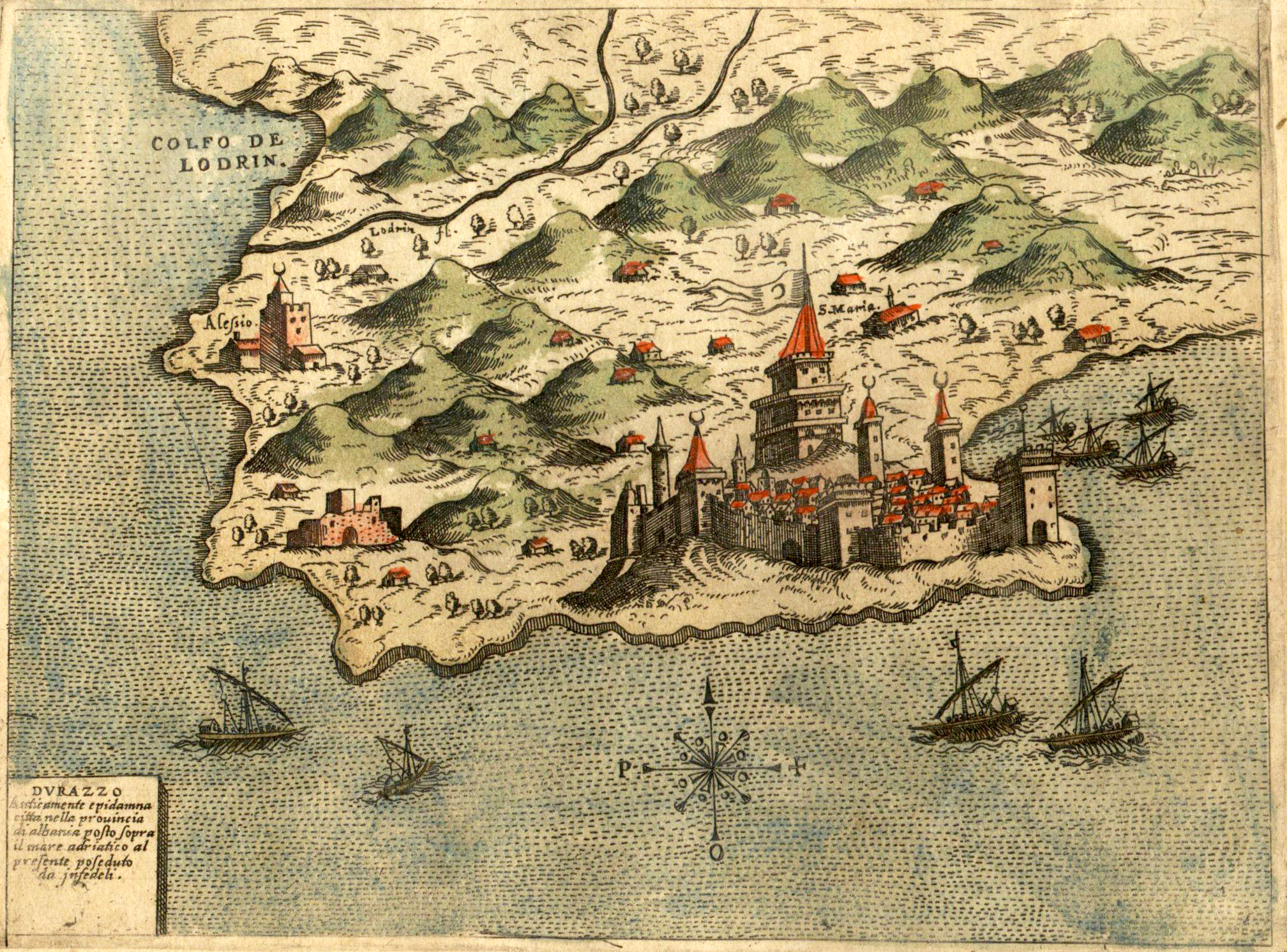
- Durazzo in 16th century
Date	17 August 1501
Location	Durrës, Albania
Result	Ottoman victory

Belligerents
Ottoman Empire	Republic of Venice

Commanders and leaders
Gazi Mehmet Bey Çelebi	Unknown

Strength
Unknown	200 men

Casualties and losses
Unknown	Garrison destroyed

The Fall of Durrës happened on 1501, when an Ottoman force was dispatched to capture the Venetian stronghold Durrës in Albania. The Ottomans successfully captured it, ending the Venetian presence in Albania.

== Background ==
In the year 1392, the overlord of Durazzo handed over the seaport to the Venetians hoping to keep the Ottomans at bay. Durrës was already declining before the Ottoman rule due to Black Death plague in 1348 as well as warfare and fevers from swamps nearby. Venice valued Durrës because it had important salt deposits central to Venetian Mediterranean trade dominance. Because of depopulation, Venice attempted to repopulate the fort by offering tax exemptions in 1423 and 1428 but this failed.

From October 1500 to April 1501, the city could only support 200 men garrison and 1,000 population. The residents' request to the Venetian political and military administration to bring at least 40 stratiotes to their aid was met with rejection. In this situation, the captain had tried to make some adjustments to the castle with the aim of resisting the enemy attack due to recent Ottoman– Venetian war.

== Fall ==
In summer 1501, an Ottoman force led by Gazi Mehmet Bey Çelebi was dispatched to capture the fort. The inhabitants of Durrës expected the attack would come from the sea and directed all their preparations in that direction. The attack came from Skopje, a direction thought considered impassable for a large army. Because the Venetian garrison trusted their natural environment, namely the swamps and valleys surrounding their city, and the town walls, the Ottomans made a plan. Mehmet Bey had divided his troops, having small part of them to lure the garrison out in a feigned retreat, while he had the rest of the army hidden for an ambush. This proved successful and the garrison sallied out chasing the small Ottoman force only to be ambushed and destroyed. Thus the fort fell easily to the Ottomans on August 17.

== Aftermath ==
The Ottomans converted the cathedral of the fort into a mosque. From 1501 to 1512, they strengthened and expanded the town walls, and made a few other improvements. However, the town sank into oblivion and Ottoman administrators preferred to live elsewhere from swamps and decay.

== Sources ==
- Nenad Filipović (2012), The Conquest of Durrës (1501): The Chronicle of Oruç bin Âdil and İsabey-oğlu Mehmet Çelebi (In Turkish).
- E. Shehu & R. Ruka & E. Caka (2020), Observations on Durrës fortifications in the Ottoman period (In Albanian).
- Eduart Caka (2020), Characteristics of a bordering town: Durrës during the first two centuries of the Ottoman rule (16th-17th centuries) (In Albanian).
- Noelle Watson & Paul Schellinger & Trudy Ring (2013), Southern Europe, International Dictionary of Historic Places.
