= Trabzon Expedition (1510) =

- Part of Ottoman–Persian War (1505–1517)
Date	1510
Location	Trabzon, Turkey
Result	Ottoman victory

Belligerents
Ottoman Empire	Safavid Iran

Commanders and leaders
(Ottoman Empire) Şehzade Selim	Ebrahim Mirza

Strength
Unknown	Unknown

The Trabzon Expedition refers to the event in 1510 when Shah Ismail sent a military force to Trabzon.

== Background ==
In 1510, as a response to Selim's invasion of Georgia, Shah Ismail I sent another army to Trabzon. This army, under the command of Ebrahim Mirza, was once again defeated by Prince Selim, marking the fourth consecutive defeat that Selim had inflicted on the Safavids.

== Battle ==
In 1510, Shah Ismail sent another military unit to the province that Selim had successfully defended in 1505. Shah Ismail's brother crossed Ottoman territory and marched to Trabzon, but was defeated by Selim. Tensions between the Safavids and the Ottomans continued, and in 1511, Şahkulu, sent by Shah Ismail, led a rebellion in Anatolia, but was eventually defeated and killed by the Ottomans. After Selim ascended the throne as sultan, he marched against Shah Ismail's army in the Battle of Chaldiran in 1514 and defeated the Safavids.

== Sources ==
- Mikhail, Alan (2020). God's Shadow: The Ottoman Sultan Who Shaped the Modern World. Faber & Faber. Archived from the original on 19 May 2022.
