= Siege of Caffa (1475) =

- Part of the Crimean Campaign (1475)
- The crimean peninsula before the Ottoman campaign
Date	June 1475
Location	Caffa, Crimean Peninsula
Result	Ottoman victory

Belligerents
Ottoman Empire	Republic of Genoa

Commanders and leaders
Gedik Ahmed Pasha	Unknown

The Third Ottoman Siege of Caffa took place in June 1475. This military operation was part of the Crimean Campaign of 1475 which aimed to bring the southern part of the peninsula under direct Ottoman control. Caffa, which was besieged both by sea and land by the Ottoman army under the command of Gedik Ahmed Pasha, surrendered after resisting for several days.
