= Ottoman campaign against Abkhazia =

Abkhazia Campaign
- Principalites of Abkhazia and Migrelia in the 15th century
Date	June 1454
Location	Sukhumi, Abkhazia, Georgia, Black Sea
Result	Ottoman victory • The Principality of Abkhazia swore allegiance to the Ottoman Empire.

Belligerents
Ottoman Empire	Republic of Genoa; Principality of Abkhazia

Commanders and leaders
Hamza Bey	Prince Levan

Strength
56 galleys	Unknown

The Abkhazian Expedition was a successful naval operation of the Ottoman navy under the command of Admiral Hamza Bey, which resulted in the annexation of Sukhumi to the Ottoman Empire and the subordination of the Principality of Abkhazia in June 1454.

== Expedition ==
After Sultan Mehmed conquered Istanbul on May 29, 1453, he sent letters to the Greek Empire of Trebizond and the Georgian lords in the Eastern Black Sea region, asking them to come to Istanbul, present their allegiance and pay annual tribute. In this context, Prince Liparit I of Mingrelia Dadiani became the first Georgian prince to offer his allegiance.

Then, the Ottoman navy, consisting of 56 ships under the command of Admiral Hamza Bey, sailed out to the Black Sea in 1454 and in June captured Sukhumi, an important coastal town of the Principality of Abkhazia, where a Genoese trading port called Sebastopolis was located. Thereupon, Prince Levan from the Georgian Shervashidze Dynasty, which had ruled the Principality of Abkhazia since 1325, also pledged his allegiance to the Ottoman Empire.
