= Battle of İznik =

Date	February 1423
Location	İznik, Turkey
Result	Ottoman victory

Belligerents
Ottoman Empire	(Ottoman Empire) Forces of Küçük Mustafa supported by: Byzantine Empire; Karamanids; Germiyanids; Emirate of Limnia

Commanders and leaders
(Ottoman Empire) Murad II (Ottoman Empire) Mehmed Bey † (Ottoman Empire) Ali Bey	(Ottoman Empire) Küçük Mustafa (executed) (Ottoman Empire) İlyas Pasha (Ottoman Empire) Mahmud Bey †

The Battle of İznik was a battle that took place during the Küçük Mustafa rebellion.

== Background ==
During Sultan Murad II's siege of Istanbul, the Byzantine rulers launched a new intrigue. Şarabdar İlyas was educating Murad II's two younger brothers in Bursa. The elder of these boys, Mustafa, was 12 years old, and the younger was 8. Influenced by Byzantine provocations, İlyas kidnapped the two children and took them to the Karaman beys. There, they recognized Little Mustafa as sultan and gave him an army composed of Turks under his command.

== Bursa and Iznik operations ==
Küçük Mustafa, together with Şarabdar İlyas, marched toward Bursa at the head of the forces provided by the Karamanids and the Germiyanids. Ahi Yakup from among the people of Bursa came to Küçük Mustafa and informed him that they would remain loyal to Sultan Murad. Upon this, Little Mustafa turned toward İznik and began to lay siege to the city. Little Mustafa's siege of İznik lasted for 40 days. The garrison commander, Firuzbeyoğlu Ali Bey, surrendered the city to Mustafa. When Mustafa entered İznik, he declared himself sultan there.

== Battle ==
Sultan Murad lifted the Siege of Constantinople and crossed into Anatolia to confront this rival who claimed the Ottoman throne. During this time, Sultan Murad was attempting to win over Şarabdar İlyas. He instructed him to delay Little Mustafa and deliver him to Murad, promising to grant him the governorship of Anatolia if he succeeded. Murad was successful in this stratagem as well. For this reason, İlyas began to stall Mustafa in İznik, even though the Turgutlu and Germiyan commanders were trying to take him back to Karaman.

Afterward, Sultan Murad dispatched Mihaloğlu Mehmed Bey as the vanguard toward İznik. Mehmed Bey engaged in battle with one of Mustafa's men, Taceddinoğlu Mahmud Bey. Mehmed Bey was killed during this clash. Then the Sultan's main army arrived on the battlefield. Mustafa's forces began fleeing into the fortress of İznik. The fortress fell and was plundered. Şarabdar İlyas took Mustafa and set out to deliver him to Sultan Murad. When Mustafa asked İlyas where he was taking him, İlyas replied, “To your brother.” Mustafa begged, saying, “Do not take me to my brother; my brother will kill me,” but it was of no use. İlyas handed Mustafa over to Murad. After Little Mustafa was strangled, his body was hung from a fig tree outside the walls of İznik. Taceddinoğlu Mahmud Bey was also found in his hiding place by Mihaloğlu's men and was torn to pieces. Thus, the rebellion of Little Mustafa came to an end.
