= Siege of Trepča =

Siege of Trepca
Date	1455
Location	Trepča, Serbian Despotate
Result	Ottoman victory

Belligerents
Ottoman Empire	Serbian Despotate

Commanders and leaders
Mehmed II	Unknown

Strength
50,000	Unknown

The siege of Trepča was a successful assault by Mehmet the Conqueror in the second Serbian campaign in 1455.

== Background ==
While those in the West gave up the crusade, Sultan Mehmet started his second Serbian expedition, despite the peace treaty. Because of preparations in Hungary, he considered his promises and all related obligations invalid.

In addition, as soon as Mehmet returned to Edirne, Hungarians and Serbs took up arms and captured the environs of Niš and Kosovo. The Sultan went on a campaign with his army again.

== Siege ==
The Serbian leader, as in 1454, did not offer open resistance. Cities and forts were equipped with troops and supplies. Villagers were advised to flee either to the castles or to the forests and mountains. The new capital of the state, Smederevo, was ready for a long siege. Georg took his wife and children and a few people from the palace and crossed the Danube to Hungary, where he had lands and castles in the south. He was sure that no danger awaited there, since he had made peace with John Hunyadi.

Mehmed directed his forces towards Southern Serbia in 1455. He captured the Trepça, Novo Brdo and silver mines.

== Sources ==
- Jorga, Nicolae (2018). Büyük Türk - Fatih Sultan Mehmed. Yeditepe Yayinevi. ISBN 9786052070383.
