= Battle of Hrastovica (1561) =

- Part of the Ottoman wars in Europe; Ottoman–Croatian Wars
| Date | 1561 |
| Location | Hrastovica, Kingdom of Croatia, Habsburg monarchy (near Petrinja) |
| Result | Croatian victory |
| Territorial changes | Ottoman expansion halted |

Belligerents
| Ottoman Empire | Habsburg Monarchy: Kingdom of Croatia |

Commanders and leaders
| Malkoč-beg of Bosnia Eyalet | Local castellan |

Strength
| Few thousand yamaks | Up to 120 soldiers and some armed serfs |

Casualties and losses
| Light | Light |

The Battle of Hrastovica (Croatian: Bitka kod Hrastovice) was an unsuccessful Ottoman raid into Croatia led by Malkoč-beg, Beylerbey of Bosnia Eyalet. The battle was a part of the Croatian–Ottoman wars and Ottoman–Habsburg wars between the Ottoman Empire and the Habsburg monarchy.

== Prelude ==
Hrastovica (now a village near Petrinja) was a fortified market town and a property of the Bishop of Zagreb in the Middle Ages. Due to Ottoman raids, the market town was fortified with a wall and two castles (the Upper and the Lower Castle), manned by two castellans with their crew. After the first Ottoman raids into Banija, in the middle of 16th century, Hrastovica was reinforced with two watchtowers on adjacent hills and became an important post in the Military Frontier and a seat of Hrastovica captaincy (regional military command).

== Battle ==
Map of Croatia and Ottoman expansion at the beginning of 1558

According to the chronicle of Nikola Tomašić, the forces of Malkoč-beg, Beylerbey of Bosnia, were defeated near Hrastovica in 1561. The Ottoman raiders were defeated by local serfs and the minor garrison from the fort.

== Aftermath ==
Beylerbey of Bosnia Ferhad-bey Sokolović unsuccessfully attacked Hrastovica in 1576 with 7,000 men. In 1577, the fort had had a captain, a governor, 20 German mercenaries, and 100 uskoks. After the fortress of Karlovac was built, Hrastovica lost its military importance, so in 1582, the Lower Castle was slated, and the inhabitants were resettled in Turopolje in 1583. Hasan Pasha Predojević conquered Hrastovica in 1592, in 1594, and in 1595. It changed hands several times but was finally liberated from the Ottomans together with Petrinja who took on its former military role.

== Bibliography ==
- Vojna enciklopedija (1970–76), 10 volumes, Vojno izdavački zavod Beograd, book 3, p. 498, article Hrastovica (in Serbo-Croatian)
