= Siege of Ohrid (1395) =

Siege of Ohrid (1395) Rrethimi i Ohrit
- Part of the Ottoman wars in Europe
Date	1395
Location	Ohrid
Result	Ottoman victory

Belligerents
Principality of Albania	Ottoman Empire

Commanders and leaders
Konstantin Balšić	(Ottoman Empire) Ali Pasha

Casualties and losses
Heavy	Unknown

The siege of Ohrid (Albanian: Rrethimi i Ohrit) was a successful siege by the Ottoman army on city of Ohrid (present-day North Macedonia) in 1395.

== History ==
The Ottoman army under the command of Çandarlızade Ali Pasha attacked the city of Ohrid. The Albanian forces, who lost many soldiers in the conflicts, had to surrender the city to the Ottoman army, and Turkish domination began in Ohrid.

== See also ==
- Principality of Albania
