= Ottoman invasion of Imereti and Guria (1509) =

1508 campaign by Selim I

Date	1509
Location	Georgia
Result	Ottoman victory
Territorial changes	Imereti and Guria were brought under Ottoman rule

Belligerents
Ottoman Empire	Kingdom of Imereti; Principality of Guria

Commanders and leaders
(Ottoman Empire) Şehzade Selim	Alexander II; George I

Casualties and losses
Unknown	More than 10,000 enslaved

The Ottoman invasion of Imereti and Guria (1509) was an attack against the Georgian states Kingdom of Imereti and Principality of Guria led by Selim, who was then the governor of Trabzon.

In 1507, Selim defeated the Safavid army at Erzincan. In 1509, he organised an attack against the Georgian states Imereti and Guria. He invaded and captured the western of Georgia, bringing Imereti and Guria under Ottoman rule. During his campaign he enslaved a large number of women, girls and boys, reportedly more than 10,000 Georgians.
