= Battle of Khan Yunis =

Battle of Khan Yunis may refer to:

- Siege of Khan Yunis
- Second battle of Khan Yunis
- Third battle of Khan Yunis
- Fourth Battle of Khan Yunis
