= Sultan Murad =

Sultan Murad may refer to:

== Rulers ==
- Sultan Murad (Aq Qoyunlu) (1483–1514)
- Murad I (1326–1389)
- Murad II (1404–1451)
- Murad III (1546–1595)
- Murad IV (1612–1640)
- Murad V (1840–1904)

== Armed groups ==
- Sultan Murad Division
