= Siege of Šabac (1521) =

Coordinates: 44.7642°N 19.7036°E

- Part of the Ottoman wars in Europe and Hungarian–Ottoman Wars
Date	7 July 1521
Location	Šabac
Result	Ottoman victory

Belligerents
Kingdom of Hungary	Ottoman Empire

Commanders and leaders
Unknown	Suleiman I Ahmed Pasha

Casualties and losses
All defenders killed	Unknown

The siege of Šabac or Szabács occurred on 7 July in the year 1521 when the Ottoman Empire conquered the Šabac fortress.

In 1520 Suleiman the Magnificent ascended to the throne. The Ottomans under the leadership of Ahmed Pasha conquered the fortress of Šabac on 7 July in 1521. All of its defenders were killed. After its conquest Suleiman said that it was one of the cities he had conquered and that it must be improved. He ordered towers to be built around the fortress and a moat around it filled with water from Sava. Suleiman spent 10 full days on the Sava at Šabac overseeing the construction of the pontoon bridge.
