= Battle of Užice (1458) =

Battle of Tahtalu/Užice
- Part of the Hungarian–Ottoman Wars
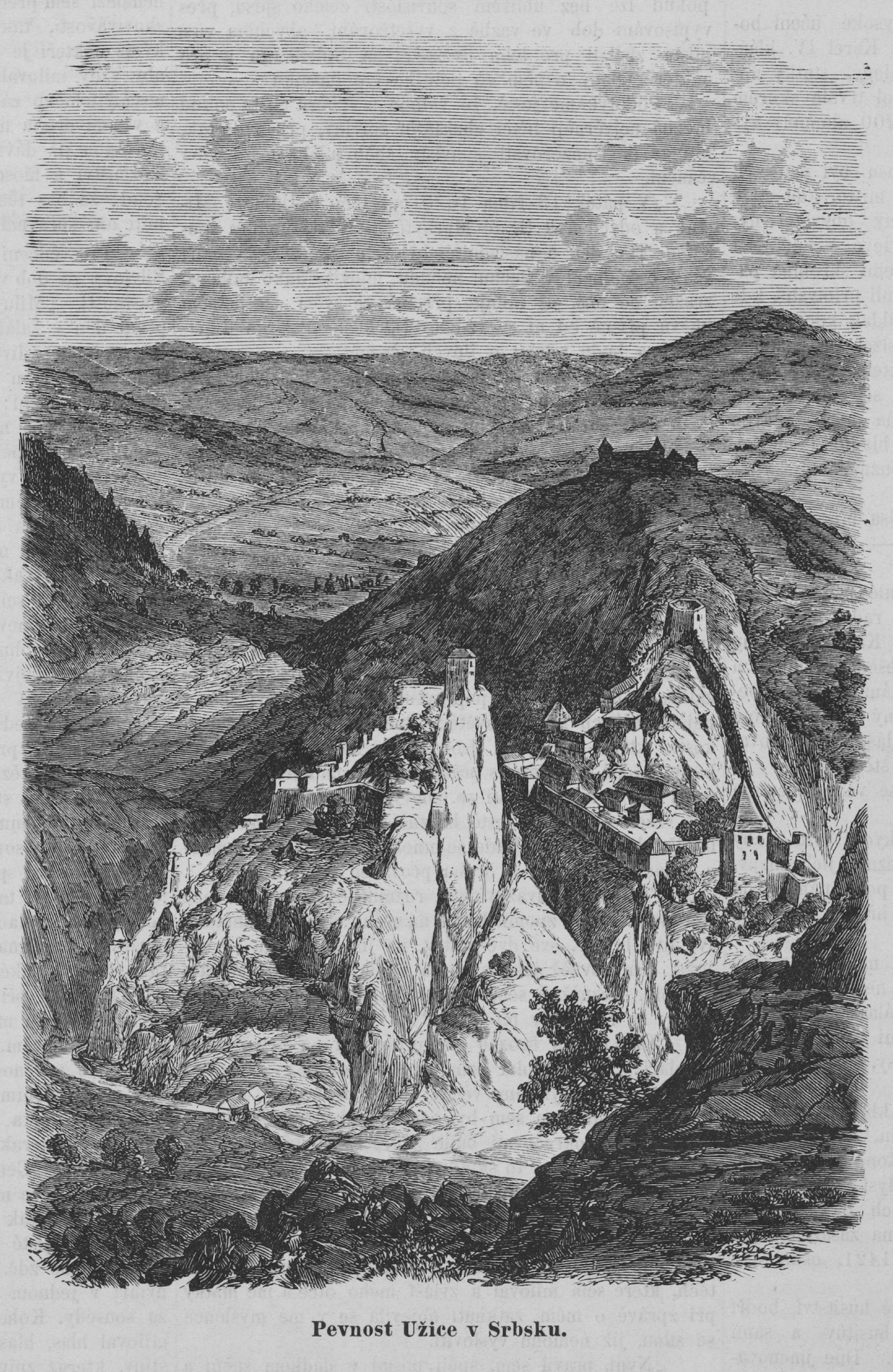
- Uzice Fortress
Date	1458, Autumn
Location	Serbia, Užice
Result	Ottoman victory

Belligerents
Ottoman Empire	Kingdom of Hungary

Commanders and leaders
Mehmed the Conqueror; Mahmud Angelović	Unknown

Strength
Unknown	Unknown

Casualties and losses
Unknown	Most of the army killed or taken prisoner

The Battle of Tahtalu/Užice was a land battle that took place between the forces of the Ottoman Empire and the Kingdom of Hungary in 1458.

== Background ==
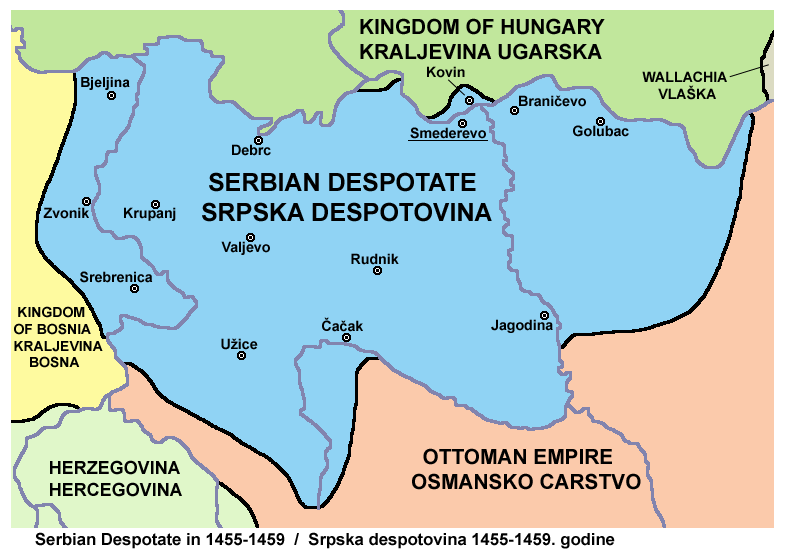
Serbian Despotate

Following turmoil in the Serbian Despotate after the deaths of the Serbian rulers Đurađ Branković on 24 December 1456 and his successor Lazar Branković (who swore allegiance to Mehmed II in 1457) on 20 February 1458, Mehmed decided to send an army under the command of the Grand Vizier Mahmud Pasha to Serbia while he was campaigning in the Peloponnese. Mahmud Pasha added Güzelcehisar, Sivricehisar (Ostrvica), Böğürdelen (Šabac), and Rudnik to Ottoman lands. The Ottoman army would continue its conquests and capture Güvercinlik (Golubac) in mid-August. Mahmud then conducted a raid north of the Danube into the Kingdom of Hungary. Following this, the Grand Vizier came to Skopje and met with Mehmed II, who had returned from his campaign in the Peloponnese.

== Battle ==
During the meeting between Mahmud Pasha and the Sultan, reports were received about a Hungarian army assembling near the Danube to launch an offensive on Ottoman lands. The Hungarians waited until the onset of autumn (when a part of the Ottoman forces would annually disband following the end of the summer campaign season) to launch their offensive, a tactic commonly employed by John Hunyadi. The Pasha and Mehmed the Conqueror ensured that some units were kept under arms instead of being disbanded in case the Hungarian army attacked before winter set in after the Ottomans withdrew.

During autumn, the Hungarian army crossed the Danube near Belgrade and entered Ottoman lands in Serbia. In response, the Sultan instructed the Ottoman troops in the region to hold the various local mountain passes. A contingent of Ottoman troops was ordered to ascertain where the invaders were marching towards. The Hungarians soon marched on the Ottoman castle of Tahtalu (near Drvengrad) in the Mokra Gora - Užice region and began to plunder the surrounding areas.

In the course of their plundering, the Hungarian troops spread out over a large area, not expecting the presence of Ottoman troops in the region. This caused them to lose contact with each other, which enabled the local Ottoman forces to ambush them. The Hungarian army suffered heavy casualties and was forced to retreat back to Hungary. Following the victory, during which a significant number of Hungarian troops and commanders had been captured as prisoners, the local Ottoman troops were disbanded as was customary. Mehmed and Veli Mahmud Pasha then returned to Edirne in December 1458.

== Aftermath ==
The Battle of Tahtalu, although not a military engagement directly won by the main Ottoman army, was a significant development in the history of the Despotate of Serbia, as it paved the way for the Despotate's annexation by the Ottoman Empire the following year. Since Helena, the Despotess of Serbia and the widow of Lazar Branković, did not want the Orthodox Serbian people to be under the command of Catholic Hungarians, she handed Smederevo Castle to the Ottomans in 1459, bringing the Serbian Despotate to an end.
