= Sheikh Bedreddin =

Mystic and revolutionary (1359–1420)

Sheikh Bedreddin Mahmud bin Israel bin Abdulaziz (Ottoman Turkish: شیخ بدرالدین; 1359–1420) was an influential sheikh, scholar, theologian, proto-communist and revolutionary. He is best known for his role in a 1416 revolt against the Ottoman State, in which he and his disciples posed a serious challenge to the authority of Sultan Mehmet I and the Ottoman state.

== Early life ==
Many details of Bedreddin's early life are disputed, as much of it is the subject of legend and folklore. He was born in 1359 in the town of Simavna (Kyprinos), near Edirne. His father was the ghazi of the town, and his mother was the daughter of a Byzantine fortress commander. He was born in a family with political and intellectual prominence. His grandfather was a high-ranking Seljuk officer. Notably, Bedreddin was of mixed Muslim and Christian parentage, with a Christian mother and a Muslim father; this contributed to his syncretic religious beliefs later in life. Turkish scholar Cemal Kafadar opined that Bedreddin's ghazi roots may also have contributed to his commitment to religious coexistence. In his youth he was a kadi to Ottoman warriors on the marches, which gave him ample experience in jurisprudence, a field of study in which he would become well-versed. Bedreddin was exposed to a variety of different cultures during his education, traveling far from his birthplace in Thrace. He studied theology in Konya, and then in Cairo, which was the capital of the Mamluk Sultanate. After this, he traveled to Ardabil, in what is now Iranian Azerbaijan. Ardabil was under the control of the Timurids, and was home to the mystic Safavid order. Surrounded by mystics and far removed from the religious norms of the Ottoman Empire, Bedreddin was in an excellent place to cultivate his unconventional religious ideology. There he found an environment sympathetic to his pantheistic religious beliefs, and particularly the doctrine of "oneness of being". This doctrine condemned oppositions such as those of religion and social class as interference in the oneness of God and the individual, and such doctrine ran contrary to increasing Ottoman efforts to establish Sunni Islam as the state religion. By adopting it, Bedreddin further established himself as a subversive.

During the Ottoman Interregnum after the defeat of sultan Bayezid I by Tamerlane in 1402, Bedreddin served as the kadiasker, or chief military judge, of the Ottoman prince Musa as Musa struggled with his brothers for control of the Ottoman sultanate. Along with the frontier bey Mihaloglu, he was a chief proponent of Musa's revolutionary regime. While kadiasker, Bedreddin gained the favor of many frontier ghazis by distributing timars among them. Through this he aided these unpaid ghazis in their struggle against centralization, a clear indication of his subversive side.

== Revolt of 1416 ==
After Musa's defeat by Ottoman sultan Mehmed I in 1413, Bedreddin was exiled to İznik, and his followers were dispossessed of their timars. However, he soon decided to capitalize on the climate of opposition to Mehmed I following the disorder of the still-fresh interregnum. Leaving his exile in Iznik in 1415, Bedreddin made his way to Sinop and from there across the Black Sea to Wallachia. In 1416, he raised the standard of revolt against the Ottoman state.

Most of the revolts that ensued took place in regions of İzmir, Dobruja, and Saruhan. The majority of his followers were Turcomans. The rest included frontier ghazis, dispossessed sipahis, medrese students, and Christian peasants. The first of these rebellions was kindled in Karaburun, near İzmir. There, Borkluje Mustafa, one of Bedreddin’s foremost disciples, instigated an idealistic popular revolt by preaching the communal ownership of property and the equality of Muslims and Christians. Most those who revolted were Turkish nomads, but Borkluje's followers also included many Christians. In total, approximately 6,000 people revolted against the Ottoman state in Karaburun. Torlak Kemal, another of Bedreddin’s followers, led another rebellion in Manisa, and Bedreddin himself was the leader of a revolt in Dobruja, in contemporary northeastern Bulgaria. The heartland for the Dobruja revolt was in the Deliorman region south of the Danube Delta. Bedreddin found disciples among many who were discontent with sultan Mehmed; he became a figurehead for those who felt they had been disenfranchised by the sultan, including disgruntled marcher lords and many of those who had been given timars by Bedreddin as Musa's kadiasker, which had been revoked by Mehmed.

These uprisings posed a serious challenge to the authority of Mehmed I as he attempted to reunite the Ottoman Empire and govern his Balkan provinces. Although they were all eventually stifled, the series of coordinated revolts instigated by Bedreddin and his disciples was suppressed after only great difficulty. Torlak Kemal's rebellion in Manisa was crushed and he was executed, along with thousands of his followers. Borkluje's rebellion put up more of a fight than the others, defeating first the army of the governor of Saruhan and then that of the Ottoman governor Ali Bey, before it was finally crushed by the Vizier Bayezid Pasha. According to the Greek historian Doukas, Bayezid slaughtered unconditionally to ensure the rebellion's defeat, and Borkluje was executed along with two thousand of his followers. Sheikh Bedreddin's own Dobruja rebellion was a short-lived one, and came to an end when Bedreddin was apprehended by Mehmed's forces and taken to Serres. Accused of disturbing the public order by preaching religious syncretism and the communal ownership of property, he was executed in the marketplace.

== Thought and writings ==
Sheikh Bedreddin was a prolific writer and religious scholar, and a distinguished member of the Islamic religious hierarchy. He is often regarded as a talented voice in religious sciences, particularly for his thoughts on Islamic law. For his works on jurisprudence he is classed among the great scholars of Islamic thought. On the other hand, many condemn him as a heretic for his radical ideas on religious syncretism. Bedreddin advocated overlooking religious difference, arguing against zealous proselytism in favor of a utopian synthesis of faiths. This latitudinarian interpretation of religion was a major part of what allowed him and his disciples to instigate a broad-reaching popular revolt in 1416, unifying a very heterogeneous base of support.

Bedreddin's religious origins were as a mystic. His form of mysticism was greatly influenced by the work of Ibn al-‘Arabi, and he is known to have written a commentary of Ibn al-‘ Arabi's book Fusus al-hikam (The Quintessence of Wisdom). Through his writings, he developed his own form of mysticism. His most significant book, Varidat, or Divine Inspirations, was a compilation of his discourses which reflected on his ideas about mysticism and religion. Bedreddin was a monist, believing that reality is a manifestation of God's essence, and that the spiritual and physical worlds were inseparable and necessary to one another. As he writes in Varidat, he believed that "This world and the next, in their entirety, are imaginary fantasies; Heaven and Hell are no more than the spiritual manifestations, sweet and bitter, of good and evil actions."

Bedreddin's metaphysical beliefs greatly influenced many of his political and social ideas, particularly the doctrine of Wahdat al-wujūd, or "Oneness of Being". This doctrine condemns worldly divisions which its adherents believe hinder the oneness of the individual with God, including social discord between religious communities and divisions between the privileged and the powerless. This belief system is reflected in the beliefs of Bedreddin and his disciples, who, among other things, preached that all religions stemmed from the same fundamental truth, as well as that ownership of property should be communal. Such ideas appealed greatly to those who felt marginalized in Ottoman society, and this egalitarian ideology played a major role in inspiring popular revolt in 1416.

Bedreddin's sympathy towards and popularity among Christians might have been influenced by his Greek heritage. While Bedreddin was himself a distinguished Islamic scholar and theologian, his mother had been a Greek Christian, who allegedly converted to Islam when she married his Muslim father. Bedreddin was born in Dimoteka, and grew up familiar with the culture, religion, and sociopolitical plight of his mother's people. He considered national divisions, including the division between Greek and Turk, to be another distraction from achieving Wahdat al-wujūd.

The 15th-century Ottoman historian Idris of Bitlis alleged that Bedreddin claimed to be the Mahdi, founding a heretical sect which made "many forbidden things lawful", and won the support of the ignorant masses through "latitudinarian" promises. Idris' account is partial, and few other sources state that Bedreddin claimed to be the Mahdi. This allegation of Mahdism is possibly slanderous; but millenarianism was popular in folk religious movements and peasant rebellions of the time (e.g., in the Safavid movement, or the rebellion of Şahkulu), so it might be true.

== Impact ==
Sects of Bedreddin's followers continued to survive long after his death. His teachings remained influential, and his sectarians were considered a threat until the late sixteenth century. Known as the Simavnis or the Bedreddinlus, a sect of his followers in Dobruja and Deliorman continued to survive for hundreds of years after his execution. Unsurprisingly, the Ottoman government viewed this group with great suspicion. In the sixteenth century, they were regarded as identical to the Qizilbash, and persecuted along with them. Some of Bedreddin's doctrines also became common among some other mystic sects. One such sect was the Bektashi, a dervish order commonly associated with the Janissaries.

Sheikh Bedreddin continues to be known in Turkey, especially among socialists, communists, and other political leftists. In the twentieth century, he was brought back into the spotlight by the communist Turkish writer Nâzım Hikmet, who wrote The Epic of Sheikh Bedreddin to voice opposition to the rise of fascism in the 1930s. Hikmet's work popularized Bedreddin as a historical champion of socialism and an opponent of royal tyranny, and his name has remained well known to those on the left of the political spectrum. His bones were exhumed in 1924, but his devotees were so fearful of a backlash against Bedreddin's newfound political significance by the Turkish government that he was not buried until 1961. He was finally put to rest near the mausoleum of Mahmud II, in Istanbul.

Like Abu Dharr al-Ghifari, Sheikh Bedreddin is looked to as an example by Islamic socialists.
