= Torlak Kemal =

Ottoman rebel (died 1419)

Torlak Kemal, born as Samuel of Manisa (died 1419 in Manisa), was one of the followers of Sheikh Bedreddin. Together with Börklüce Mustafa, he led the Sheikh Bedreddin revolt.

== Identity ==
Torlak Kemal, a murid of Sheikh Bedreddin (1359–1420), was known by his birth name, Samuel of Manisa. He later converted to Islam and changed his name to Kemal and became a Torlak, a Kalenderis.

== Death ==
Probably around the same time as Börklüce Mustafa, he started a rebellion in Manisa, Ottoman Empire. The uprising was a small one. It was crushed with violence by the Ottomans, and all the rebels were killed. It is unknown whether the rebellion was committed with the approval of Sheikh Bedreddin, but all sources agree on the fact that Börklüce Mustafa and Torlak Kemal were followers of Sheikh Bedreddin, a Muslim Sufi theologian, who led a rebellion against the Ottoman Empire in 1416. In 1419, the rebellion was defeated, and Torlak Kemal was captured and executed by hanging in Manisa.
