= Battle of Ostrvica =

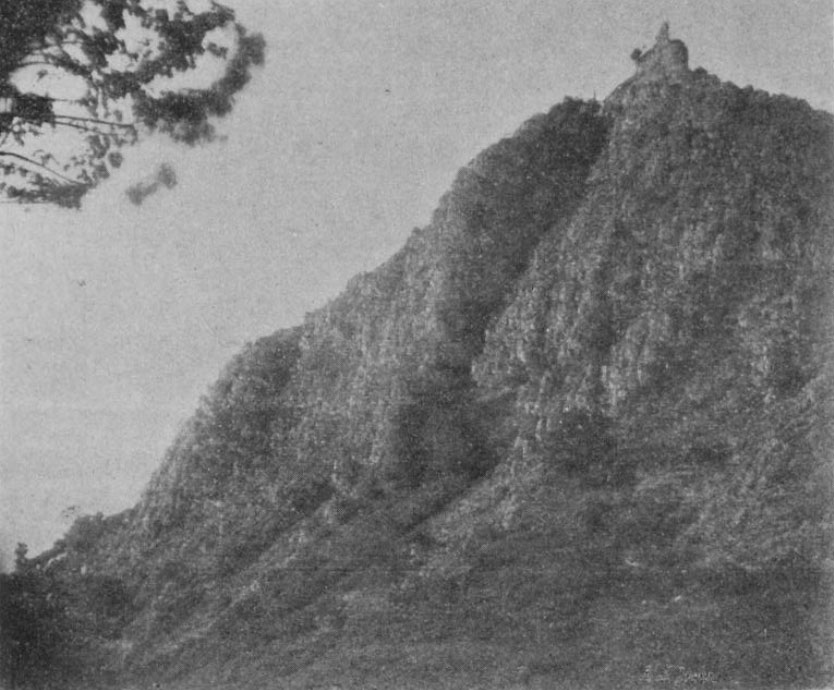
- Mount Ostrvica
Date	April 1454
Location	Serbian Despotate
Result	Ottoman victory

Belligerents
Ottoman Empire	Serbian Despotate

Commanders and leaders
Mehmed II; Ishak Hranić	Đurađ Branković

Strength
10,000 cavalry	9,000 cavalry (relief army); Unknown garrison forces

The Battle of Ostrvica was Mehmed the Conqueror's successful capture of the Ostrvica Fortress in 1454 during his first Serbian campaign.

== Before ==
After the death of Sultan Murad II and the conquest of Istanbul, the Serbian despot Đurađ Branković sent a delegation to the Ottoman ruler Mehmed II who at the time was in Edirne. Mehmed was presented with the keys to some Serbian castles that had formerly belonged to the Ottomans, as well as being congratulated for his success in taking Constantinople. At the same time, with the encouragement of the Pope, the Despot was in negotiations with the Hungarians to participate in a new Crusade, which was intended to be against the Ottomans. The Ottomans learned about the Hungarian contacts of the Serbian despot aimed against them through their spies and prepared to retaliate accordingly.

After the Ottoman court asked the Serbian delegation for the keys to other castles which had belonged to the Ottomans but were passed onto the Serbs, they were refused. Thereupon, a campaign against Serbia was made in the spring of 1454.

== Battle ==
Mehmed led the expedition in 1454. His intention was to cross into enemy territory and destroy everything on his path. During this quick expedition, thousands of prisoners were taken and settled in Istanbul as a new Christian population for the city. The cavalry (9,000 strong as per a Venetian visiting John Hunyadi) sent against the Ottoman army by the Serbian despot trapped in Smederevo was easily repulsed. Mehmed the Conqueror then arrived at the Ostrvica Fortress, (Note: Known as Sivricehisar in Ottoman sources) where the Serbian Despot had left his kingdom's treasury to prevent it from falling into Ottoman hands. After the Ottoman cannoneers took their positions, they started firing upon the castle's walls. Initially, the city's garrison put up resistance, even launching a number of sorties against the besieging forces which were unsuccessful. However, after heavy Ottoman bombardment resulted in the destruction of the city walls, the inhabitants decided that their situation had become untenable, agreeing to surrender in exchange for their lives being spared. The inhabitants of the city were left untouched, however the city's garrison which had resisted the Ottomans were turned into prisoners. Mehmed had been able to easily capture the castle, along with Đurađ's assets present inside it.

== Aftermath ==
After the conquest of Ostrvica along with another Serbian fortress known as Omolhisar in Ottoman sources, Mehmed marched on the Serbian capital of Smederevo and put it under siege. However, the news of an approaching relief army under the command of John Hunyadi caused Mehmed to lift the siege and march back to Bulgaria, effectively ending the 1454 campaign by August.
