= Battle of Erzincan (1507) =

Ottoman victory over Safavid Iran

- Part of Ottoman–Persian War (1505–1517)
Date	1507
Location	Erzincan, Turkey
Result	Ottoman victory
Territorial changes	Status quo ante bellum

Belligerents
Ottoman Empire	Safavid Iran

Commanders and leaders
(Ottoman Empire) Şehzade Selim	Ebrahim Mirza

Strength
Unknown, but less	10,000

The Battle of Erzincan was fought against the Safavids in 1507 led by Selim, who was then the governor of Trabzon.

== Background ==
In 1505, Shah Ismail's brother Ibrahim set out with an army of 3,000 men to plunder Selim's province; however, the Safavid army was routed, and Selim pursued them as far as Erzincan, slaughtering many and seizing their weapons and ammunition.

== Battle ==
In 1507, the Safavids, under the command of Shah Ismail, launched a new raid into Anatolia against Ala al-Dawla Bozkurt of the Dulkadirids. This constituted a violation of Ottoman sovereignty, considering that Shah Ismail had encroached upon Ottoman territory and recruited Turkmen warriors, who were Ottoman subjects into his army.

== Aftermath ==
Despite this victory, his father, Sultan Bayezid II, ordered him to return the territory to the Safavids for diplomatic reasons.

In 1509, Selim led a campaign against the Georgian states Imereti and Guria, capturing them and incorporating Imereti and Guria into Ottoman territory. In 1510, Shah Ismail's brother returned to Trabzon with an army but was defeated by Selim.
