= Battle of Ulubad (1422) =

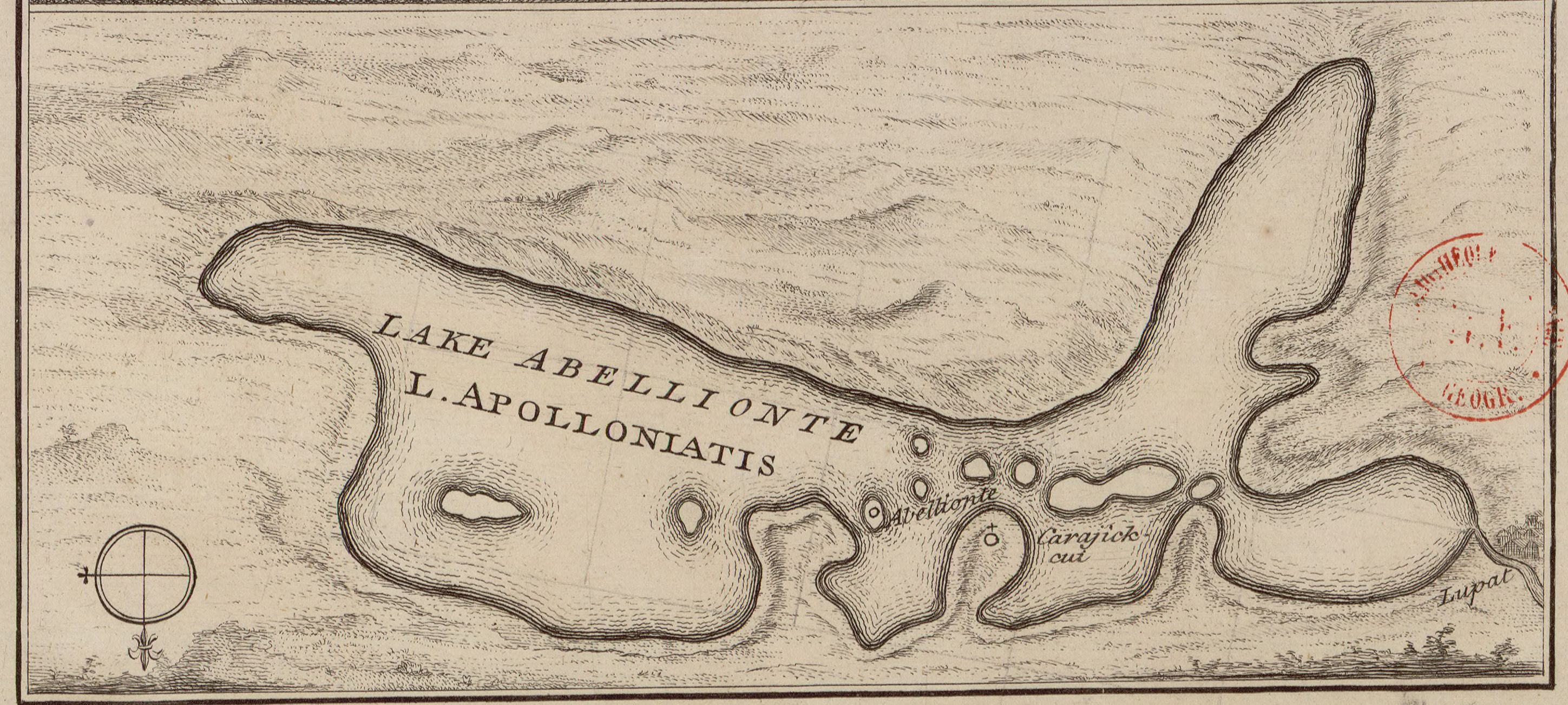
- Lake Ulubad
Date	1422
Location	Lake Uluabat, Bursa, Turkey
Result	Victory for Murad II

Belligerents
Ottoman Empire	(Ottoman Empire) Forces of Mustafa Çelebi supported by: Byzantine Empire

Commanders and leaders
(Ottoman Empire) Murad II (Ottoman Empire) Mehmed Bey (Ottoman Empire) İvaz Pasha (Ottoman Empire) Umur Bey	(Ottoman Empire) Mustafa Çelebi; Junayd Bey (AWOL)

Strength
2,000 Jannisary (participating in the battle)	17,000 (12,000 cavalry, 5,000 ınfantry)

Casualties and losses
Unknown	5,000

The Battle of Ulubad was the second clash that took place during Çelebi Mustafa's second rebellion.

== Background ==
After Murad II ascended the throne, Emperor Manuel sent envoys to Bursa and demanded hostages from the Ottoman dynasty, threatening Murad II. When Bayezid Pasha rejected this proposal, Manuel released Mustafa Çelebi and Cüneyt Bey, who had been kept on Lemnos. According to the agreement Mustafa Çelebi made with the emperor, once he seized the throne, he would return all the cities on the Thracian and Western Anatolian coasts, as well as the Black Sea shores, to the Byzantine Empire. Byzantine ships disembarked Mustafa and Cüneyt Bey in the vicinity of Gallipoli. Believing that a 17-year-old boy (Murad II) could not rule the empire, a large portion of the Thracian population began to side with Mustafa. Within a few days, Mustafa gathered a large force composed of Thracians, Macedonians, and Epirotes in the plain of Thessaloniki.

== Battle ==
Upon hearing that Mustafa Çelebi had come to Anatolia, Murad II left Bursa and advanced toward Lake Ulubat. He positioned himself behind the river there. Since he had destroyed the bridge connecting the two banks, his left flank rested on the sea, and his right flank was secured by Lake Ulubat and its marshes; to bypass the lake and the swamps, one had to march for three days along the foothills of Mount Uludağ. Stationed in a very strong position and accompanied by his most loyal viziers, the sultan carefully observed the movements of Mustafa Çelebi, who had taken up position on the opposite bank. On the advice of his commanders, Murad II released Mihaloğlu Mehmed Bey, who had been imprisoned in the Castle of Tokat, and brought him to his side.

Mihaloğlu Mehmed Bey, the famous raider commander of Rumelia, met secretly at midnight with members of the Evrenos family—the renowned commanders on Mustafa Çelebi's side—and with several other Rumelian beys, attempting to persuade them to join Murad. They were excited to meet this celebrated commander of Rumelia. Mehmed Bey called out across the river in the night, urging his comrades-in-arms and their soldiers to come over to Murad's side, and his appeal proved effective: the Rumelian beys crossed over with their troops and joined Murad. Their defection greatly weakened Mustafa's forces.

However, the Azaps, who were among Mustafa's most loyal troops, remained on his side. Five thousand of them planned to cross the river where it was fordable and launch a night attack on the sultan's army. But since Sultan Murad was aware of their preparations, he ordered Umur Bey, together with two thousand janissaries, to lie in ambush in a forest stretching along the river crossings. When the Azaps reached the ford, the janissaries attacked them, killing many and capturing the survivors, who were brought back to camp.

Hacı İvaz Pasha sent a letter to Cüneyt Bey, the most powerful man at Mustafa Çelebi's side, in order to draw him away. In the letter, he promised that if Cüneyt abandoned Mustafa and defected, the Beylik of Aydın would be restored to him. At the same time, he wrote a separate letter to Mustafa, claiming that Cüneyt was preparing to defect with his troops and deliver him into Sultan Murad's hands. This stratagem proved just as successful as the first.

While Mustafa Çelebi was troubled by such suspicions among his men, he awoke one morning to find that Cüneyt Bey had indeed deserted him. Realizing that his army was melting away on its own, Mustafa Çelebi found no choice but to flee.
