= Börklüce Mustafa =

Börklüce Mustafa was one of the principal disciples of Sheikh Bedreddin. He lived around the turn of the 14th/15th centuries, and preached a system that can be compared to modern Communism. Between 1415–1416 he gathered Turkish peasants, Greek sailors and Jewish merchants on the Karaburun peninsula in order to rebel against high taxes and other injustices.

== Primary accounts ==
Börklüce Mustafa's life is relatively obscure, and well into the 20th century scarcely covered by scholarship, except in the context of his mentor, Sheikh Bedreddin. The main primary account on his activities is that of the Byzantine historian Doukas, along with a few scattered references in other sources. As a result, not even his name is certain, "Börklüce Mustafa" being but one of the suggested original names for Doukas' Hellenized rendering Περκλιτζία Μουσταφᾶ.

== Origin and teachings ==
Mustafa himself possibly hailed from Samos Island, since a Cretan hermit on Chios maintained to Doukas that he had known Mustafa, who was then living as a hermit or dervish on that island. Eventually, Mustafa was won over by the teachings of Sheikh Bedreddin, a supporter of Musa Çelebi during the Ottoman Interregnum, who had been exiled by Sultan Mehmed I to Iznik.

Mustafa however moved beyond his master in his efforts to approach the common people, and his teachings were "nothing short of revolutionary": apart from the renunciation of wealth and common ownership of goods, he also espoused the rapprochement and complete equality between Muslims and Christians. According to Doukas, he urged his followers to treat Christians as fellow believers and show them hospitality. Doukas even attributes to him the formulation "Every Turk [i.e., Muslim] who says that the Christians are not faithful to God, is himself an unbeliever". Mustafa himself set the example for his followers by living as a simple hermit, devoting his life entirely to prayer and the propagation of his ideas. For the latter purpose, he established a missionary organization, sending forth "apostles" or "stylarioi" (after the location of the mountain where he lived). These missionaries were obliged to poverty, and went about clad only in a tunic, without shoes, and with shorn heads.

When Sheikh Bedreddin fled from Iznik to Sinop, Mustafa too abandoned this area, seeking to establish himself and his followers in a place of greater safety than the former Ottoman capital. For this reason, he chose the Karaburun peninsula on the Aegean coast, where he and his followers settled in large numbers. In his nightly prayers, he claimed to mystically communicate with the Cretan hermit on Chios, who in turn told Doukas in person that Mustafa came to visit him every other night.

== Revolt ==
According to different sources he gathered around 4.000-10.000 people. In the beginning of the rebellion İskender Paşa tried to crush the revolt, but he couldn't because of the narrow alleys of the Karaburun peninsula. The people of Karaburun managed to crush the army of İskender Paşa. After this more Turkmen Muslims and Christians joined the rebellion.

After the defeat Mehmed sent Timurtaş Paşazade Ali Bey with all the troops of the Saruhan province and Aydin to Karaburun. These troops were also defeated by the peasants. Ali Bey managed to flee to Manisa.

Mehmed who heard the news this time sent his son Murat and Bayezid paşa with the troops of Rumelia and reinforcements from Anatolia on Börklüce. On his road to a mountain which was arbitrated by dervishes Bayezid paşa massacred all the people including women, children and old people. On one hand there was a bloody conflict at the Cehennem valley and on the other hand the Ottoman army controlled the harbors of the Sakiz island in order to prevent people from fleeing. A large number of the followers of Börklüce were massacred. Börklüce tried to flee to the Sakiz island with the rest of the people, but when he arrived he noticed the Ottoman navy. After a bloody battle Börklüce and his men couldn't flee and moved to the north of the peninsula where they were captured. Börklüce was taken hostage and after a lot of torturing he still insisted on his beliefs and demands. As a result, he was tortured, crucified and bound on the back of a camel to be ridiculed and shown around. The dervishes who stayed loyal to him were killed in front of his eyes. Meanwhile, there was a similar rebellion in Manisa which was probably linked with the rebellion of Karaburun. The rebellion in Manisa was under the leadership of Torlak Kemal.

Some of his followers saw him as a messiah and doubted his death.

== Philosophy and his works ==
Börklüce Mustafa was considered as an important philosopher by many theologians and philosophers in the Islamic world. He wrote Tasvîrü'l- Kulûb.

== Sources ==
- Cotsonis, H. I. (1957). "Aus der Endzeit von Byzanz: Bürklüdsche Mustafa. Ein Märtyrer für die Koexistenz Zwischen Islam und Christentum". Byzantinische Zeitschrift (in German). 50 (2): 397–404. doi:10.1515/byzs.1957.50.2.397. S2CID 194100470.
- Şaban Er, "Edirne-Simâvne Kâdîsı ve Emîri İsrâ’îl Oğlu Şeyh Bedreddîn Hakkında Son Söz", Kutupyıldızı Yayınları, İstanbul, Hazîran 2016 ( Cildli 657 Sayfa, ISBN 978-605-5291-65-5 )
- Kemal Derin : Kalplerin Işığı: Börklüce Mustafa, Destek Yayınları 2014
- Yılmaz Gruda : Köylü Devrimci Börklüce Mustafa Berfin Yayınları, 2008
- Ernst Werner : Şeyh Bedreddin ve Börklüce Mustafa Kaynak Yayınları
- Michel Balivet : Şeyh Bedreddin Tasavvuf ve İsyan Tarih Vakfı Yurt Yayınları, 2000
- Abdülbâki Gölpınarlı, Melâmilik ve Melâmîler, Gri Yayın, İstanbul, 1992
- Dr. Mesut Keskin : Das Toleranzverständnis der anatolischen Heterodoxie am Beispiel Scheich Bedreddin Mahmud Israils, 2 cilt, Berlin 1999
