= Battle of Giurgiu =

Battle of Giurgiu may refer to:

- Battle of Giurgiu (1462), during Vlad the Impaler's expedition across the Danube
- Battle of Giurgiu (1595), during the Long Turkish War
- Battle of Giurgiu (1771), during the Russo-Turkish War of 1768–1774
- Battle of Giurgiu (1854), Crimean War
