= Rise of Empires: Ottoman =

Turkish historical television series

- Poster
- Genre: Docudrama
- Written by: Kelly McPherson
- Directed by: Emre Şahin
- Starring: Cem Yiğit Üzümoğlu; Tommaso Basili; Daniel Nuță; Selim Bayraktar; Tuba Büyüküstün; Damla Sönmez; Osman Sonant
- Narrated by: Charles Dance (English); Halit Ergenç (Turkish); Marcel Iureș (Romanian)
- Country of origin: Turkey
- Original languages: English; Turkish
- No. of seasons: 2
- No. of episodes: 12

Production
- Producers: Kelly McPherson; Emre Şahin; Sarah Wetherbee
- Production location: Istanbul
- Editors: Alex Durham; Alessandro Soares
- Running time: 45 minutes
- Production companies: Karga Seven Pictures; STX Entertainment

Original release
- Network: Netflix
- Release: 24 January 2020 – 29 December 2022

Rise of Empires: Ottoman is a Turkish historical docudrama, starring Cem Yiğit Üzümoğlu, Tommaso Basili and Daniel Nuță. Its first season, which consists of 6 episodes, is directed by Emre Sahin and written by Kelly McPherson. It became available for streaming on Netflix on 24 January 2020. It deals with the Ottoman Empire and Mehmed the Conqueror and tells the story of the Fall of Constantinople. The second season also has 6 episodes and premiered on 29 December 2022, focusing on the 1462 campaign against Vlad the Impaler in Wallachia (in present-day Romania).

== Premise ==
=== Season 1 ===
In the first season,Sultan Mehmed the Conqueror wages a campaign to take the Eastern Roman capital of Constantinople in 1453, resulting in the capture of the city and establishment of the Ottoman Empire.Following the death of his father Murad II, the young Sultan Mehmed II ascends to the throne with an unwavering ambition to capture the Byzantine capital. The series chronicles the technical challenges of the siege, including the construction of the massive Orban cannons and the innovative transport of the Ottoman navy over land to enter the Golden Horn. Amidst internal friction with Grand Vizier Çandarlı Halil Pasha and guidance from his stepmother Mara Branković(played by Tuba Büyüküstün), Mehmed faces off against Emperor Constantine XI and the Genoese defender Giovanni Giustiniani. The season culminates in the successful Ottoman breach of the Theodosian Walls, marking the end of the Byzantine Empire and the rise of the Ottoman Empire as a global power.

=== Season 2 ===
Mehmed vs. Vlad, Mehmed the Conqueror and Vlad the Impaler, childhood companions in the Ottoman court, go head-to-head in the 1462 Ottoman invasion of Wallachia. Years after conquering Constantinople, Sultan Mehmed II faces a direct challenge to his authority from his childhood friend, Vlad Dracula (the Voivode of Wallachia), who refuses to pay his annual tribute.Mehmed dispatches the senior diplomat Hamza Bey to Wallachia to forcibly bring Vlad to Constantinople. Instead, Vlad ambushes the Ottoman delegation, capturing and executing them by impalement.The show utilizes flashbacks to explore the childhood of Mehmed, Vlad, and Radu when the Wallachian princes were held as royal hostages under Sultan Murad II, establishing the deep personal roots of their bitter rivalry.To isolate Vlad from Western aid, Mehmed sends his trusted stepmother, Mara Hatun, on a dangerous mission to Buda to negotiate directly with Hungarian King Matthias Corvinus , successfully convincing him to stay neutral.The Ottoman forces reach the strategic port city of Nicopolis along the Danube River . Vlad utilizes high-ground positioning and water-tactics to gain an early upper hand, forcing the Ottomans to plan a risky river crossing. In June 1462, Mehmed's army successfully breaches the river barrier under the cover of night and enters Wallachia, with Radu assisting as a tactical guide.Knowing he cannot defeat the Ottoman military in a standard pitched battle, Vlad retreats into the dense Carpathian forests and unleashes brutal psychological and scorched-earth tactics—burning his own crops, destroying shelters, and poisoning water supplies. The narrative introduces a parallel storyline in Constantinople. With Mehmed away on campaign, Gülbahar Hatun is left in charge of the imperial palace to protect the young Şehzade Bayezid, as political tension builds. As the Ottoman army's resources dwindle and the soldiers suffer from dehydration, Vlad escalates his tactics by launching biological warfare. He purposely sends plague-ridden civilians into the path of the advancing Ottoman ranks, causing the bubonic plague to breakout among Mehmed's troops. Vlad extends this biological strike to the capital. He sends secret, infected operatives to infiltrate the Grand Bazaar and slip into the imperial palace, planning to assassinate the royal lineage by spreading the disease.Seeking to break Vlad's resolve, Radu leads a specialized detachment to close in on Vlad's fortress. He attempts to capture Vlad's wife, Anastasia(fictional character), as a political hostage, but she chooses to commit suicide by jumping from the battlements rather than surrender. As Mehmed reorganizes his surviving forces for a final advance toward the capital of Târgoviște, his commanders discover a Wallachian spy deep within the Ottoman military war camp.In a desperate bid to end the war in a single strike, Vlad and his elite knights disguise themselves in Ottoman armor and launch the historic, chaotic Night Attack directly on the center of the imperial camp.Parallel to this, Gulbahar Hatun - Sultan Mehmed II's consort- alongside Mara Hatun discover the enuch working as a spy for Vlad.Upon which,they corner the infiltrator and force him to consume poison, successfully neutralizing the threat and preventing the outbreak from reaching the inner sanctum of the palace.The season concludes with an epilogue set in 1476 . Following years of exile and a failed attempt to reclaim his throne, Vlad Dracula is killed in battle. The final sequence depicts Sultan Mehmed II viewing Vlad's severed head impaled on a stake outside the walls of Constantinople, symbolizing the definitive end of their decades-long rivalry and the total consolidation of Ottoman authority over the region.

== Cast and Characters ==
- Cem Yiğit Üzümoğlu as Mehmed the Conqueror:The 7th Ottoman Sultan,son of Sultan Murad II and Huma Hatun.He successfully conquers Costantinople.Driven by a lifelong obsession to fulfill a prophecy and cement his legacy, he orchestrates the historic 1453 Siege of Constantinople in Season 1. In Season 2, his reign faces a severe internal and external threat as he leads a grueling military expedition into Wallachia to depose his rival, Vlad the Impaler.
- Tommaso Basili as Constantine XI Palaiologos (season 1):The last emperor of Byzantine Empire. He dies saving his capital during the siege of 1453.
- Daniel Nuță as Vlad the Impaler (season 2):The Voivode (Prince) who ruled the principality of Wallachia, located in modern-day Romania.
- Radu Andrei Micu as Dimitrie (season 2)
- Ali Gözüşirin as Radu the Beautiful (season 2):The Younger brother of Vlad and prince of the principality of Wallachia.He defeated his brother Vlad supporting the Ottomans under Sultan Mehmed II.
- Tuba Büyüküstün as Mara Branković: She was a Serbian princess who was married to Murad II and the stepmother of Mehmed II.She had no children but she became an important figure in her stepson's government, where she was his trusted advisor. Her major role was as a diplomat for the empire with missions to Venice and Hungary.
- Yasemin Eti as Gülbahar Hatun :The primary consort of Mehmed II and the mother of his prince, Beyazed II.She plays a crucial role in the Ottoman Imperial Harem as shown in the docudrama.
- Damla Sönmez as Ana
- Osman Sonant as Loukas Notaras (season 1)
- Tolga Tekin as Murad II:Father of Mehmed II and the 6th Ottoman Sultan himself.
- Ushan Çakır as Zaganos Pasha:The Sultan's right hand in the first season.
- Nik Xhelilaj as Mahmud Pasha (season 2):The Sultan's Grand Vizier in the second season.He is of Albanian descent.
- Selim Bayraktar as Çandarlı Halil Pasha (season 1):The Grand Vizier of Ottoman Empire in season 1 of the show. He opposes Mehmed's decision to besiege Constantinople due to concerns over economic stability, imperial overextension, and the risk of triggering a massive European military alliance against the young state. He is executed at the finale of Season 1.
- Birkan Sokullu as Giovanni Giustiniani (season 1)
- Tansu Biçer as Orban (season 1)
- Nail Kırmızıgül as Hızır Çelebi (season 1)
- Eva Dedova as Katarina (season 1)
- Tuğrul Tülek as George Sphrantzes (season 1)
- İlayda Akdoğan as Therma Sphrantzes (season 1)
- Erdal Yıldız as Suleiman Baltoghlu (season 1)
- Baki Davrak as Đurađ Branković (season 1)
- Ryan OL as Genovese Nobleman (season 1)
- Roger Crowley, historian (season 1)
- Lars Brownworth, historian (season 1)
- Jason Goodwin, historian (season 1)
- Marios Philippides, historian (season 1)
- Michael Talbot, historian (season 1)
- Emrah Safa Gürkan, historian (season 1)
- Andrei Pogăciaș, historian (season 2)
- Mihai-Florin Hasan, historian (season 2)
- Celâl Şengör, geologist
- James Waterson, author of Dracula's Wars (season 2)

== Episodes ==
=== Series overview ===
Series	Episodes	Originally released
1	6	24 January 2020
2	6	29 December 2022

=== Season 1 (2020) ===
No. overall	No. in season	Title	Directed by	Written by	Original release date
1	1	"The New Sultan"	Emre Şahin	Liz Lake, Kelly McPherson, Emre Şahin	24 January 2020
Following an interregnum when he was a child ruler, Mehmed II inherits the Ottoman throne at the age of 19 in 1451. His Grand Vizier is Halil Pasha. The Ottoman capital at the time is Adrianople. The Greek-speaking eastern Romans in Constantinople nurture Prince Orhan who is a claimant to rule the Ottoman Empire. Mehmed II orders the "Throat-Cutter Fortress" to cut off all supplies and military aides from the Roman allies in the Black Sea. Loukas Notaras, the Grand Duke under Constantine XI, distrusts the Catholic Church based in western Rome under the Pope's control. The Eastern Romans have had―for over 400 years―their own Greek-speaking Orthodox Church following the East–West Schism in 1054. After claiming the Ottoman throne, Mehmed II sends an unmistakable signal to Byzantine emperor Constantine XI. Genoese mercenary Justinianus comes to the aid of the vastly under-staffed Eastern Romans with barely 7,000 troops to defend 14 miles of Theodosian Walls. Unlike the dis-united Crusades from western Europe to Jerusalem, the Ottoman army was highly centralized under the leadership of Mehmed II focused on breaking into Constantinople.
2	2	"Through the Walls"	Emre Şahin	Kelly McPherson, Emre Şahin, Liz Lake	24 January 2020
Mehmed II uses the Basilica cannon to penetrate the Theodosian Walls. In a flashback to Mehmed's childhood, the narration goes back to when Murad II appoints his teenage son as the governor of the Amasya Province. Afterwards, Mehmed II starts with first reign of the Ottoman Empire at the age of 13—becoming the youngest king in Ottoman history. His ministers (viziers) informed him that John Hunyadi is a major threat in the west. Mehmed launches an ambitious siege to break through the walls of Constantinople, but Giustiniani's mercenaries manage to forestall the Janissaries.
3	3	"Into the Golden Horn"	Emre Şahin	Emre Şahin, Liz Lake, Kelly McPherson	24 January 2020
The seaward walls of the Golden Horn was vulnerable to Ottoman attacks The Galata Tower is a colony of Genoa serving as a watchtower over the Golden Horn. Baltoghlu, an Ottoman admiral, wants to stop the reinforcements from Genoa. John Grant susses out the localities of the Ottoman sappers undermining the city walls. Upon locating the Ottoman tunnels, Grant and his men torch them with Greek fire. Đurađ Branković, the ruler of Serbia, is hosting her daughter Mara who is also Mehmed II's stepmother. Mehmed's men dig underground tunnels in an attempt to shatter city walls. The tides turn against the Ottomans when a naval blockade founders.
4	4	"Loose Lips Sink Ships"	Emre Şahin	Liz Lake, Kelly McPherson, Emre Şahin	24 January 2020
The Eastern Roman Empire is essentially the walled-off city-state of Constantinople in 1453. Mehmed moves his ships overland to the Golden Horn in a daring, visionary feat. In the shadow of betrayal, Giustiniani attacks the Ottoman fleet.
5	5	"Ancient Prophecies"	Emre Şahin	Kelly McPherson, Emre Şahin, Liz Lake	24 January 2020
Amid a spiral of brutality and low morale, Mehmed makes Giustiniani an enticing monetary offer. The coffers of the city-state of Constantinople have become empty since the last ruler John VIII; the old hub of the Roman Empire can't trade to generate any revenue. Constantine XI can't pay the few remaining soldiers fighting to keep the Roman Empire afloat while no aid arrives from western Roman Catholics. Constantine announces that "God will pay" the soldiers, ordering a raid on the assets and artifacts of the Greek Orthodox churches. The grand vizier urges Mehmed to seek a truce with his rival.
6	6	"Ashes to Ashes"	Emre Şahin	Emre Şahin, Liz Lake, Kelly McPherson	24 January 2020
Ottoman cannons reduce the city walls to rubble, and Venetian reinforcements arrive too late. Catholic Europeans don't answer the Crusade calls of the Greek-speaking Romans in Constantinople (although back in 1203 when the 4th Crusaders arrived, they overthrew the Roman Emperor to set up the Latin Empire.) Mehmed II named himself the Caesar of Rome since Constantinople had become the new Roman capital a 1,000 years prior. Mehmed orders the execution of Notaras. Finally, Mehmed executes Halil Pasha, his Grand Minister, for not believing in him when he was a teenage king.

=== Season 2 (2022) ===
No. overall	No. in season	Title	Directed by	Written by	Original release date
7	1	"House Of War"	Emre Şahin	Liz Lake, Kelly McPherson, Emre Şahin	29 December 2022
Mehmed II solidifies his reign, but in nearby Wallachia, childhood friend Vlad the Impaler gains notoriety and seeks to challenge Mehmed's hegemony. Hamza Bey is dispatched to forcibly bring Vlad to Constantinople. Vlad travels to Buda to solidify a military alliance with Matthias Corvinus.
8	2	"Troubled Waters"	Emre Şahin	Kelly McPherson, Emre Şahin, Liz Lake	29 December 2022
Mehmed sends Mara to coax Hungarian King Matthias Corvinus into an alliance. Mehmed's forces reach the port city of Nicopolis; an epic battle along the Danube River looms, and Vlad has the upper hand. In a flashback, Radu and his brother Vlad the Impaler are being raised by Murad II in Constantinople to ensure that their father Vlad II Dracul doesn't join forces with Hungary to fight against Ottomans.
9	3	"Land of Dracula"	Emre Şahin	Emre Şahin, Liz Lake, Kelly McPherson	29 December 2022
In June 1462, Mehmed II's troops have crossed the Danube River into Wallachia; As the night attack at Târgoviște unfolds, Vlad employs guerrilla tactics to weaken his rival. A threat lurks in the imperial palace. Radu, Vlad's brother who was raised in the Ottoman royal court, is in Mehmed's camp.
10	4	"Brothers No More"	Emre Şahin	Liz Lake, Kelly McPherson, Emre Şahin	29 December 2022
As the war drags on and resources dwindle, Vlad wages biological warfare on Mehmed's army. Radu closes in on Vlad's castle to take Anastasia, Vlad's wife, hostage. However, she commits suicide.
11	5	"Night Attack"	Emre Şahin	Kelly McPherson, Emre Şahin, Liz Lake	29 December 2022
Mehmed prepares to strike a fatal blow to Vlad's army. A spy is found in Mehmed's camp. Vlad launches a nighttime attack, but a surprise awaits.
12	6	"Destiny"	Emre Şahin	Emre Şahin, Liz Lake, Kelly McPherson	29 December 2022
Vlad and Mehmed face off. Mara and Gülbahar foil the Wallachian plot. Ottoman troops march into a scorched Târgoviște and face a gruesome sight. Vlad impales Hamz Bey. Radu is crowned in Wallachia after Vlad Dracula flees to Transylvania

== Critical response ==
Generally, the reception is positive. Rise of Empires: Ottoman delivers, with a similarly novel approach, a chronicle of historical events. Daily History concludes that "the series uses correct timeline and description of the attack on Constantinople is incredibly accurate from the Ottoman perspective." However, "despite the historical accuracy of the show, the dramatized events are more geared towards a captivating watching experience rather than an actual depiction of events." Some historians, such as Florian George Calian, suggest that the historical accuracy of at least the first session might be open to question: "In the Netflix production Mehmed enters an empty Hagia Sophia alone, thus converting the most wanted building in the world into a mosque. The scene is dubbed by interviews with contemporary scholars, making viewers interested in acquiring historical knowledge believe that the series is well documented. But unfortunately, everything depicted here is inaccurate." Critics praised the series for its high production values and engaging pacing, with Amanda Guarragi of Ready Steady Cut noting that the show possesses a "cinematic feel equivalent to Game of Thrones while educating viewers." While some historians nitpicked specific costume choices, media critics like Johnny Loftus of Decider lauded the dramatization for "putting faces with the names that rise out of the historical record," creating a highly accessible and visually impressive entry point into Ottoman history.

On the review aggregator website Rotten Tomatoes, the first season holds an approval rating of 87% based on 66 reviews, and an average rating of 4.3/5.

== See also ==
- Fall of Constantinople
- Night Attack at Târgoviște
