= Hate speech laws in Turkey =

Turkey laws relating to hate speech

Hate speech laws in Turkey refer to legislation in Turkey that criminalizes speech or actions that insult, degrade, or incite violence against individuals or groups based on their statue, race, religion, ethnicity, gender, sexual orientation, language, sect, or similar characteristics. The purpose of these laws is to prevent discrimination, hostility and social exclusion created through written, verbal or visual expressions.

Although these laws were designed to prevent discrimination and social exclusion, their enforcement has been a subject of criticism from domestic and international observers. Various human rights organisations, including Amnesty International, have documented that such provisions are often applied selectively, being used to prosecute government critics, journalists, and academics rather than protect vulnerable groups. The European Court of Human Rights (ECtHR) has repeatedly found Turkey in violation of Article 10 of the European Convention on Human Rights, which protects freedom of expression, further ruling against the country in cases involving the prosecution of individuals for perceived anti-government speech under provisions relating to insult and incitement.

This has led to raised concerns about the weaponisation of the law, and consequently, the country's legal landscape is characterised by the systematic restriction of freedom of expression under the guise of maintaining public order.

== What is hate speech? ==
The Committee of Ministers of the Council of Europe, in its 1997 Recommendation R(97)20, describes hate speech as any form of expression in speech, writing, or behaviour that spreads, incites, promotes, defends, or justifies racial hatred, xenophobia, antisemitism, or other forms of intolerance-based hatred, including aggressive nationalism, ethnocentrism, and discrimination against minorities, migrants, or people of immigrant origin.

== Historical developments ==
=== Ottoman period ===
During the Ottoman period, restrictions concerning expression were generally connected to the maintenance of public order, religious harmony, and the protection of state authority rather than a modern legal concept of hate speech. The Ottoman legal system regulated relations among religious communities through the millet system, under which different communities possessed varying degrees of legal autonomy. Expressions perceived as threatening intercommunal coexistence or political stability could be subject to legal or administrative sanctions. Historians have noted that Ottoman governance prioritized social order and religious coexistence over modern conceptions of individual freedom of expression.

=== Early republican period ===
Following the establishment of the Republic of Turkey in 1923, legal approaches to speech increasingly emphasized national unity, secularism, and the protection of state institutions. Although modern hate speech terminology was not used during the early Republican period, legal restrictions concerning expression affecting national cohesion became more prominent. Historians of modern Turkey have observed that the republican legal framework prioritized the consolidation of the new state and social transformation through a more centralized legal system.

=== Contemporary developments ===
From the late twentieth century onward, as part of its ongoing integration efforts with European institutions, the Turkish legal system has increasingly incorporated aspects of international legal frameworks concerning hate speech, in particular those of the Council of Europe and the ECtHR. Contemporary regulation of hate speech-related conduct operates primarily through provisions of the Turkish Penal Code concerning incitement, discrimination, and public order. In its jurisprudence concerning Turkey, the ECtHR restrictions on expression must remain proportionate and compatible with freedom of expression protections under Article 10 of the European Convention on Human Rights.

== Legislative framework ==
=== Absence of a unified framework ===
Turkish law does not include a single consolidated legal instrument specifically dedicated to hate speech. Instead, relevant provisions are distributed across multiple articles of the Turkish Penal Code and related legislation.

=== Constitutional foundations ===
The Turkish Constitution provides the fundamental legal basis for regulating hate speech through various provisions related to equality, freedom of thought, and protection of religious beliefs:

- Article 10 guarantees equality before the law and prohibits discrimination based on language, race, color, sex, political opinion, philosophical belief, religion, or other similar grounds. This underpins the application of hate speech laws targeting discrimination and hostility among groups.
- Article 24 protects freedom of religion and conscience, allowing for limitations necessary to protect public order and prevent hatred against religious groups.
- Article 26 ensures freedom of thought and expression but permits restrictions for reasons such as protecting national security, public order, or the rights and reputation of others.
- Article 28 covers freedom of the press subject to similar restrictions to safeguard social harmony.

=== Penal code provisions ===
Based on these constitutional principles, hate speech in Turkey is primarily regulated under the Turkish Penal Code (Law No. 5237 of 2004) with key articles as follows:

- Article 61 requires courts to consider hate motives in the determination of penalties, reinforcing the constitutional prohibition on discrimination and hostility.
- Article 115 punishes coercion or obstruction of religious beliefs and practices, using force or threats, with imprisonment between one and three years.
- Article 122 criminalizes discrimination by denying or obstructing rights based on language, race, nationality, gender, belief, or religion, with penalties of one to three years' imprisonment.
- Article 125 criminalizes insult against individuals. Although not classified as a hate speech provision, it has been applied in cases involving allegedly discriminatory or offensive expression.
- Article 216 criminalizes the public incitement of hatred and hostility between different segments of society on the basis of social class, race, religion, sect, or regional origin, where such conduct poses a clear and imminent threat to public order. This article prescribes imprisonment from six months to three years if the act places public safety at risk.
- Article 218 outlines extended penalties for offences defined in the aforementioned articles committed through the press or broadcasting, but explicitly states that the expression of thoughts in the form of criticism do not constitute an offence.
- Article 299 criminalizes insults against the President of Turkey and has been applied in a significant number of prosecutions in recent years.
- Article 301 of the Turkish Penal Code criminalizes insults directed at the Turkish nation, the State of the Republic of Turkey, and its institutions.

According to Human Rights Watch, these provisions are frequently discussed in the context of broader restrictions on freedom of expression in Turkey, although they are not formally categorized as hate speech legislation.

=== Legal bodies ===
The Human Rights and Equality Institution of Türkiye (HREIT) was established in 2016 by Law No. 6701 and functions as the national equality body, in line with various European Commission directives. Subordinate to the Ministry of Justice and operating with administrative and financial autonomy, its mandate includes the protection and promotion of human rights, guaranteeing individuals' right to equal treatment, the prevention of torture and ill-treatment, as well continuing the implementation of international human rights conventions to which Turkey is party. However, the European Commission Against Racism and Intolerance (ECRI) highlights various legislative gaps with respect to the independence and impartiality of the HREIT as a legal body due to the fact that the President of Turkey has discretionary authority to exercise administrative institutional powers and directly appoint its members.

=== Enforcement and case law ===
Reports by Human Rights Watch indicate that Article 216 of the Turkish Penal Code has been applied in cases involving alleged incitement to religious or ethnic hatred, although prosecutions under this provision remain relatively limited. By contrast, broader speech-related provisions, particularly those concerning insult, have been applied more frequently in practice. According to the same organization, legal actions involving expression in Turkey often rely on general criminal provisions rather than narrowly defined hate speech laws.

=== International comparison ===
Comparative legal analyses demonstrate that Turkey’s approach differs from several European countries. In Germany, for example, hate speech is addressed through specific criminal provisions, while in the United States such speech is generally protected under constitutional free speech guarantees unless it incites imminent unlawful action. Meanwhile, Turkish law places a stronger emphasis on the protection of public order, requiring that incitement reach a threshold of clear and imminent danger before criminal liability arises, a standard that has been discussed in the jurisprudence of the European Court of Human Rights.

The European Court of Human Rights, such as in Erbakan v. Turkey (2006), held that restrictions on political speech must be proportionate and that even controversial expressions are protected under Article 10 unless they incite hatred or violence.

== Reports of human rights organizations ==
Reports from human rights and civil society organizations indicate that hate crimes are highly prevalent in Turkey. The absence of a comprehensive legal framework addressing hate speech and hate crimes has created significant gaps in the law. These shortcomings allow such attacks to continue and hinder the development of effective prevention measures.

The Human Rights Association (İHD) emphasizes in its report on hate speech and hate crimes that legal measures must be applied effectively to combat these offenses. Authorities at all levels, including political leaders, should refrain from using any form of hate speech. The report stresses that unless discriminatory, divisive, and polarizing language is curtailed, hate crimes in Turkey are likely to persist. Such rhetoric can influence nationalist and racist groups and may escalate into acts of violence. Law enforcement agencies and public prosecutors should collaborate closely with victims throughout the reporting, investigation, and prosecution of racist, homophobic, and transphobic crimes, ensuring their protection at all times. Additionally, these professionals should receive regular, specialized training to manage these cases effectively and uphold justice.

In addition, country information reports prepared by the Netherlands and Australian governments (such as the Netherlands Country of Origin Information Reports and the Australian DFAT Country Information Reports) have identified the effectiveness of laws and measures to combat hate crime and hate speech in Turkey.

== Criticism and abuse of anti-hatred laws ==
Various human rights organisations have documented widespread misuse of the country’s hate speech laws. A 2024 report from the ECRI detailed a general rise in reported incidents of hateful rhetoric against religious and ethnic minorities, especially in the media during election periods. Targeted groups include Alevis, Kurds, refugees and migrants, and LGBT+ individuals. Although Articles 122 and 216 of the Turkish Penal Code criminalise discrimination and incitement to hatred, these laws were found to be “rarely used to their fullest extent”.

The Hrant Dink Foundation, a human rights and peace-building organization established in 2007 in Istanbul advocating for democracy, pluralism, and minority rights for all people in Turkey, regardless of their ethnic, cultural, or religious backgrounds, regularly publishes cases of hate speech appearing in both national and local print media. In 2020 alone, the organisation recorded 1,286 such cases. As recently as 2024, cases include a Yeni Akit article referring to German media as ‘Nazi remnants’ in response to their criticism of footballer Merih Demiral making the ‘gray wolf’ gesture whilst representing the national team; a Yeniçağ column criticising LGBT+ representation at the opening ceremony of the 2024 Olympic Games, characterising members of the community as ‘deviant’ and ‘satanic’; and a Yeni Mesaj piece asserting the non-existence of a Kurdish ethnic identity, where such a conception is a fabrication designed to ‘divide the Turkish nation’.

Critics argue that authorities have weaponised these provisions to target dissent rather than to protect vulnerable groups. In April 2025, the Istanbul Chief Public Prosecutor's Office initiated criminal investigations against citizens calling for a boycott of pro-government businesses in response to the detention and subsequent arrest of Istanbul mayor Ekrem İmamoğlu, citing Articles 122 and 216 of the penal code as the legal basis for their actions. Some observers, including actor Cem Yiğit Üzümoğlu, pointed out that boycotting is a legal form of protest, as Articles 25, 26, and 34 of the Turkish Constitution guarantee the freedom of thought and opinion, the freedom of expression and dissemination of thought, and the right to hold meetings and demonstration marches respectively. Dr Aytekin Kaan Kurtul, a lecturer in Law at the University of Huddersfield, warns of the precedent set in which legal frameworks designed to abide by international human rights conventions can be used to suppress dissent under the guise of combatting hate speech.

Journalists and academics are frequent targets of this legal mechanism. In October 2024, Turkish journalist Can Ataklı received a 10‑month deferred prison sentence for statements made about the father of a soldier killed in an attack by the Kurdistan Workers’ Party (PKK), a designated terrorist organisation by the Turkish government. He was found guilty of violating Article 216 to ‘[incite] hatred and enmity’ and remains accused of disparaging those who don’t agree with his views, further illustrating how the provision has been used to punish critical commentary rather than genuine hate speech. A 2007 report from the Kurdish Human Rights Project documented that Articles 216 and 220 were regularly used to target Kurdish and pro-Kurdish journalists, with the Turkish state dismissing detained journalists as working for ‘terrorist newspapers’.
