= Grudge =

Grudge may refer to:

- Resentment

== Arts ==
=== Film ===
- Ju-On (franchise), aka The Grudge, a Japanese-American film franchise
  - Ju-On: The Grudge, a 2002 Japanese horror film
  - The Grudge (film series), an American horror film series
    - The Grudge, an American horror film
    - The Grudge (2020 film), formerly Grudge, an American horror film
- Grudge (2021 film), a Turkish thriller film

=== Music ===
- The Grudge (album), a 2004 album by Mortiis
- "The Grudge", a song by Tool from Lateralus
- "The Grudge" (song), a 2023 song by Olivia Rodrigo from the album Guts
- "Grudges", a 2017 song by Paramore from the album After Laughter
- "Grudges", a 2026 song by Melanie Martinez from the album Hades

== Other uses ==
- Project Grudge, a project by the U.S. Air Force to investigate unidentified flying objects (UFOs)
- Al Ba'sa or The Grudge, a spite house in Beirut
- Grudge, a character in Making Fiends

== See also ==
- Ressentiment
