= Battle near the Danube (1458/1462) =

Part of Ottoman–Wallachian wars

- Part of Ottoman–Wallachian wars
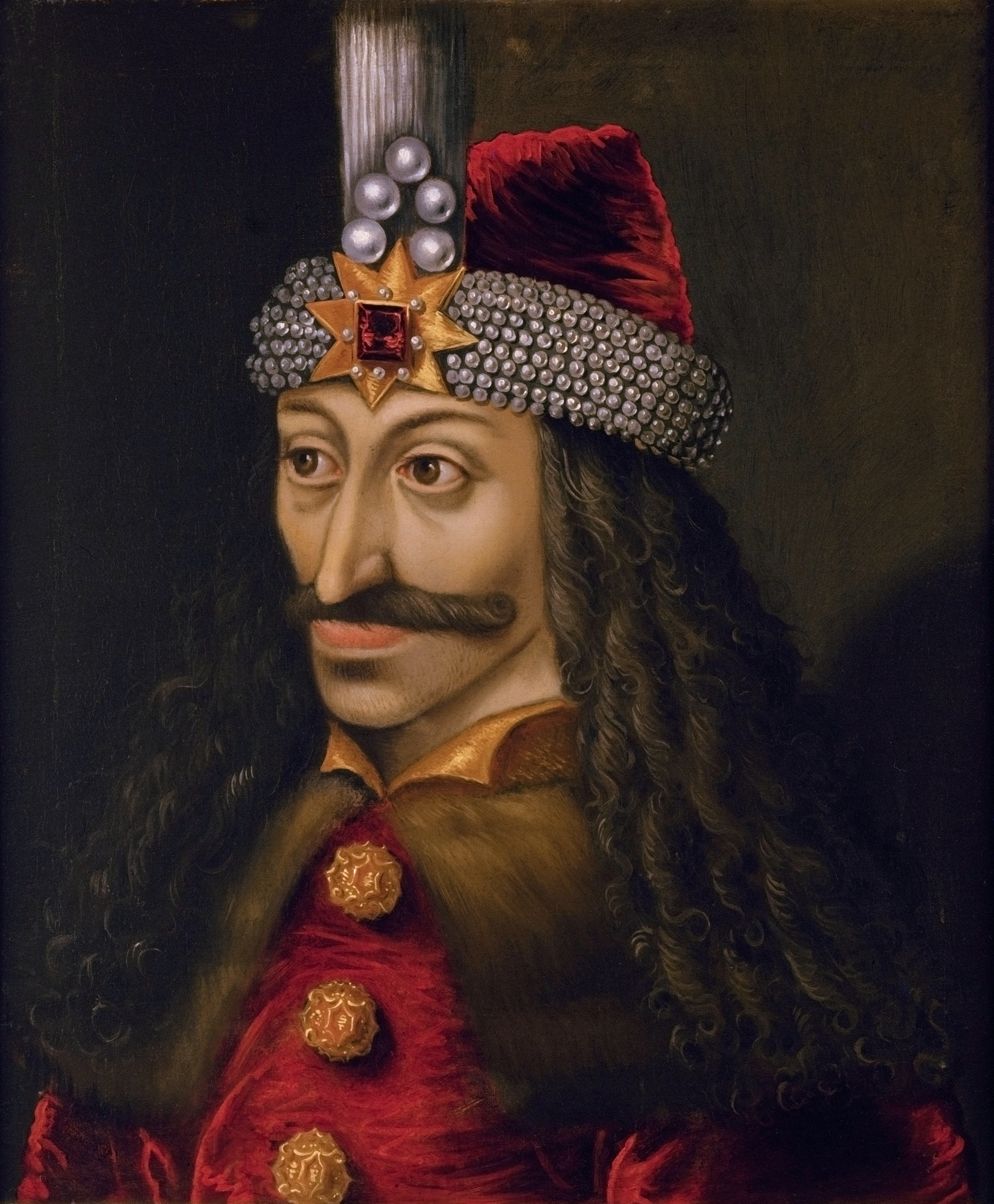
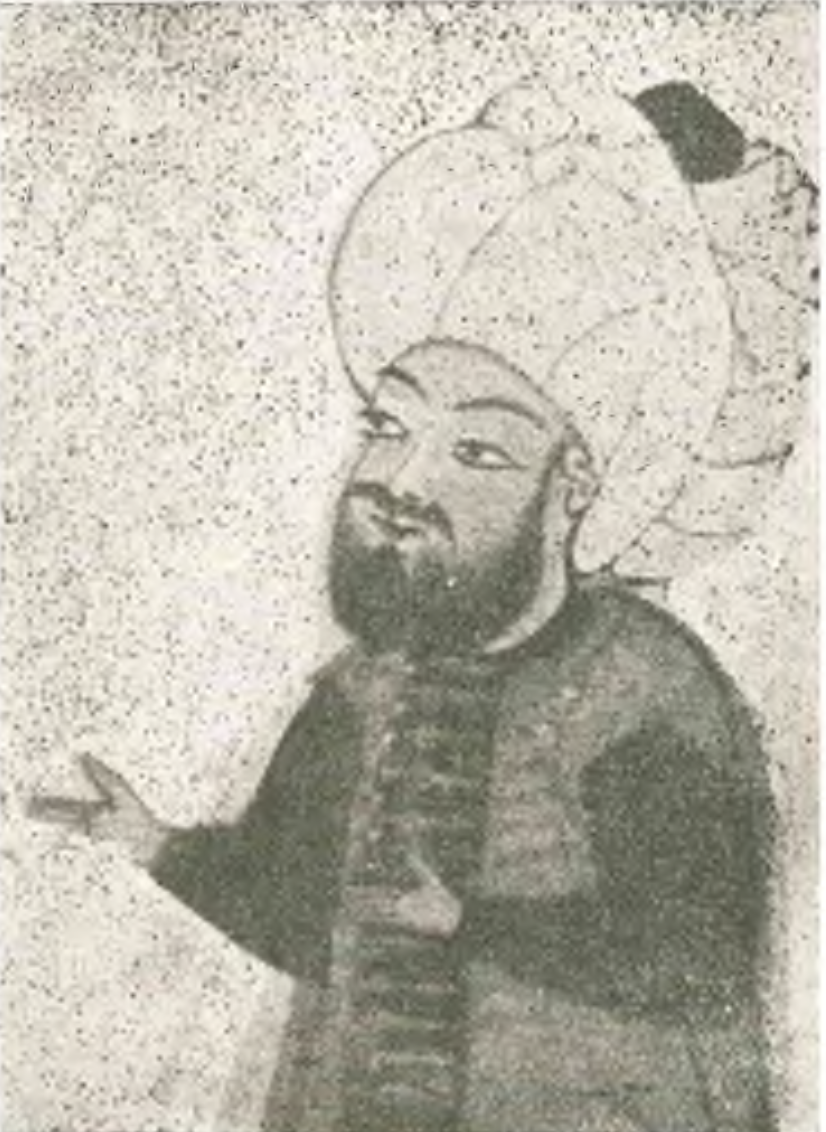
- Vlad Dracula Mahmud Pasha
Date	1458 or 1462
Location	Lower Danube River; possibly near Brăila
Result	Wallachian victory

Belligerents
Wallachia	Ottoman Empire

Commanders and leaders
(Wallachia) Vlad III	(Ottoman Empire) Mahmud Pasha

Strength
5,000	18,000–30,000

Casualties and losses
Unknown	Over 10,000 killed or drowned

The Battle near the Danube was a battle between Wallachian forces under Vlad III and Ottoman forces under Mahmud Pasha. Grand vizier Mahmud Pasha was sent to guard the Danube River by Sultan Mehmed II, to prevent a potential crossing by the Hungarians or to punish Vlad for attacks on Ottoman land. The battle took place near the Lower Danube River, possibly near Brăila in 1458, or more likely sometime in early 1462 following Vlad's invasion of Ottoman territory. The battle resulted in the retreat of Mahmud Pasha's forces after suffering heavy losses.

== Background ==
Sultan Mehmed II was departing from Edirne to invade the Peloponnese. Before doing so, he sent Grand Vizier Mahmud Pasha with a force of 30,000 to guard a ford along the Danube river in case of a Hungarian invasion.

The chronology is debated, with many historians arguing the battle actually took place sometime after Vlad's invasion of Ottoman territory. Vlad crossed the Danube river, attacking forts and towns in Ottoman controlled Bulgaria. Sultan Mehmed II, being preoccupied at the time, sent Mahmud Pasha to attack the Wallachian fort at Brăila.

Vlad's army consisted of loyal courtiers and boyars, as well as a few hundred Hungarian mercenaries from Transylvania.

== Battle ==
Mahmud crossed the Danube river, where he raided and ransacked villages and a fortress (possibly Brăila), as well as taking 5,000 Christian hostages. Mahmud returned to the Danube with the captives and stolen loot. Vlad, who was nearby at the time, after hearing about the attack on the fortress, set out for the Turkish army. Mahmud crossed the river with half of his army, the other half, as well as the captives and loot, remained on the other side. Vlad attacked Mahmud's army on the side of the river that was abandoned, reclaiming the stolen goods and freeing the captives. He pursued the remaining army, catching up with them and slaughtering many. Some reportedly drowned attempting to cross the river. Mahmud, fearing that Vlad's army was much bigger than it seemed, retreated and fled with his remaining forces to Sofia. Of the 18,000 Turks involved in the battle, less than 8,000 escaped.

== Aftermath ==
After the retreat, Mahmud Pasha notified the Sultan of the defeat; he was reportedly furious. The defeat caused the Sultan to focus more personally on Vlad as a threat. News of the defeat spread throughout Constantinople reportedly causing mass panic, with many residents allegedly fleeing. The 5,000 captives were rescued and the stolen goods were reclaimed by Vlad.

== Disputed details ==
The original source for the battle, a Venetian chronicle titled "La progenia della casa de' Octomani", states that the Battle occurred in 1458, while Sultan Mehmed II was invading Peloponnese. It specifically states that after receiving the news of Mahmud Pasha's defeat, the Sultan personally abandoned the Siege of Corinth, angrily returning to Edirne.

For a few reasons, modern historians such as Ştefan Andreescu state that the battle must have actually occurred in early 1462, in between Vlad's invasion of Ottoman territory, and Mehmed II's invasion of Wallachia. Andreescu considers it unlikely that the Sultan would wait four years to respond to such a massive defeat. The original chronicle also states that the battle took place somewhere around the beginning of the hostilities between Wallachia and the Ottoman empire, when Vlad owed 3 years worth of tribute payment to the Sultan. It is now known that this rise in tensions occurred around 1461-1462, making the date of 1458 unlikely. The original source also incorrectly states that 1459 was the year Vlad died and the year his brother Radu would take the Wallachian throne. This mix up of dates also leads historian Nicolae Stoicescu to similarly believe the battle took place after Vlad's expedition across the Danube, which started in 1461. Andreescu also believes that it's unbelievable, yet plausible given the context, that a great number of Turks would have fled Constantinople out of fear following the battle.

Likewise, Romanian historian Eugen Denize, when reporting on a Spanish source covering the same battle, clarifies that the events took place in the year 1462. Historians Radu Florescu and Raymond T. McNally also place the battle after Vlad's invasion of Ottoman territory, which occurred during 1461–1462.

Romanian historian Nicolae Iorga accepted the date of 1458 as the first major confrontation between Vlad and the Turks. Likewise, French-Romanian historian Matei Cazacu, also accepts the accuracy of the 1458 claim. He reconstructed a chronological timeline of Mahmud Pasha's expedition as ordered by Mehmed II. In this reconstruction, he places Mahmud's Wallachian incursion around late August or early September of 1458, with the targets being either of the Hungarian controlled locations of Severin or Orșova.
