= Night attack at Târgoviște =

1462 Wallachian battle with the Ottomans

- Part of the Wallachian campaign and the Ottoman–Wallachian wars
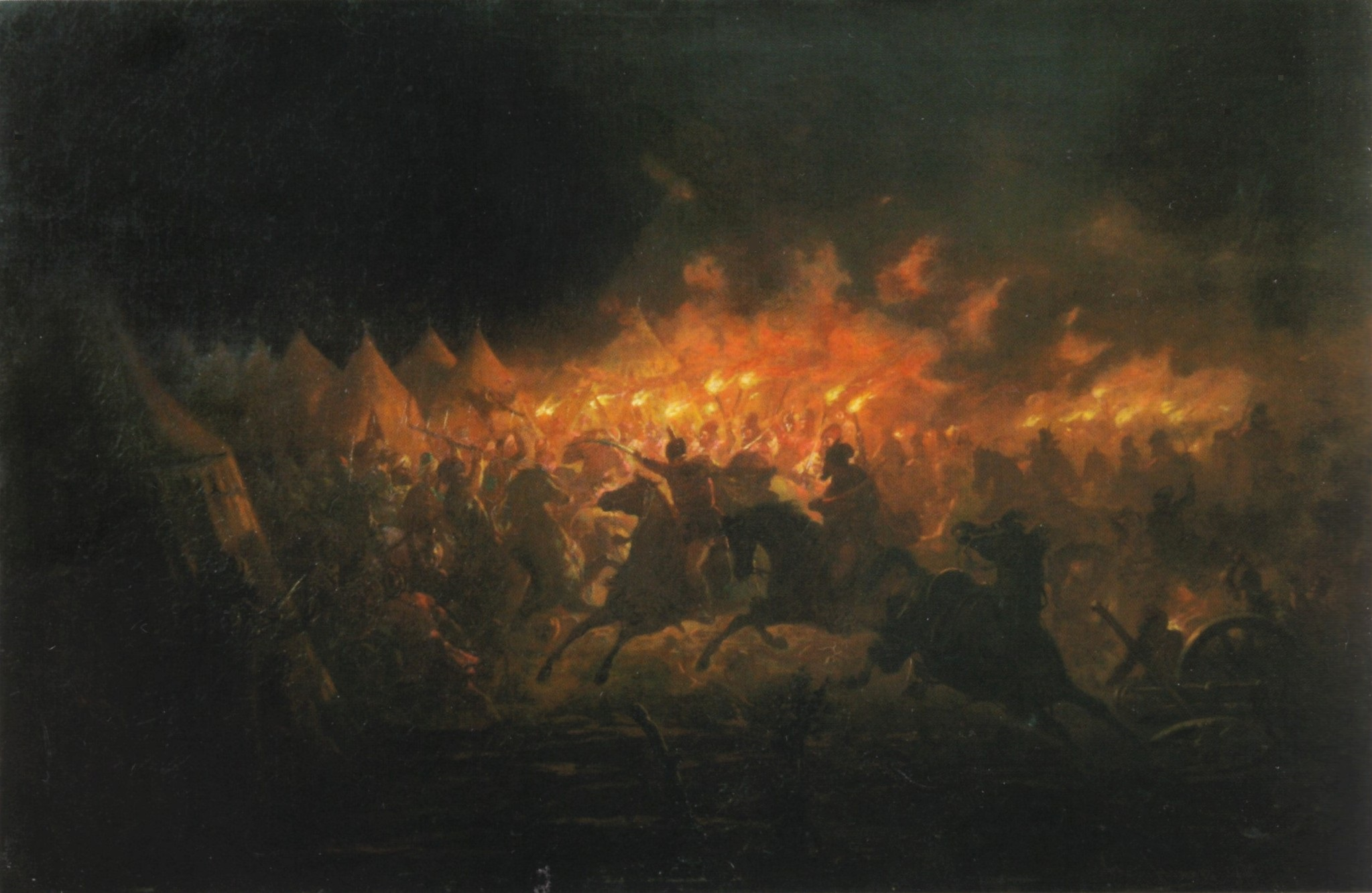
- The Battle With Torches by Romanian painter Theodor Aman (1866)
Date	17 June 1462
Location	present-day Târgoviște, Romania
Result	Inconclusive

Belligerents
Wallachia	Ottoman Empire

Commanders and leaders
Vlad III	Mehmed II

Strength
30,000; 7,000–10,000 in battle	Contemporary estimates vary from 90,000 to 300,000; consisting of 15 tumens according to Mehmed II himself 34,000–39,000 (modern estimate)

Casualties and losses
5,000 dead 2,700 captured	10,000–15,000 insignificant military losses, consisting of many horses, camels, and mules Several thousand Turks, as well as many horses and camels, according to Janissary Konstantin Mihailović

The night attack at Târgoviște (Romanian: Atacul de noapte de la Târgoviște) was a battle fought between forces of Prince Vlad III of Wallachia and Sultan Mehmed II of the Ottoman Empire on Thursday, 17 June 1462. The battle started after Mehmed II, who already had tense relations with Vlad, discovered his alliance with Hungary's king Matthias Corvinus and ordered his forces to ambush him. Vlad foiled the attack and invaded Bulgaria. In response, Mehmed raised a great army with the objective to conquer Wallachia. The two leaders fought a series of skirmishes, the most notable one being the conflict where Vlad attacked the Turkish camp in the night in an attempt to kill Mehmed. The assassination attempt failed and Mehmed marched to the Wallachian capital of Târgoviște, where he found a few men with cannons. After leaving the capital, Mehmed discovered 23,844 impaled Turks whom Vlad had killed during his invasion of Bulgaria. The number is mentioned by Vlad himself in a letter to Matthias Corvinus. The sultan and his troops then sailed to Brăila and burned it to the ground before retreating to Adrianople. Mehmed's forces returned home with many captured slaves, horses, and cattle.

== Background ==
After the fall of Constantinople to the Ottoman Empire in 1453, Mehmed set his sights on other campaigns. In Anatolia, the Greek Empire of Trebizond was still resisting the Ottomans, and to the East the White Sheep Turkomans of Uzun Hasan, together with other smaller states, threatened the Ottomans. In the West, Skanderbeg in Albania continued to trouble the Sultan, while Bosnia was sometimes reluctant in paying the jizya. Wallachia controlled the left bank of the Danube, and Mehmed wanted to have control over the river, as naval attacks could be launched against his empire all the way from the Holy Roman Empire. On 26 September 1459, Pope Pius II called for a new crusade against the Ottomans and on January 14, 1460, at the Congress of Mantua, the Pope proclaimed the official crusade that was to last for three years. His plan, however, failed and the only European leader that showed enthusiasm for the crusade was Vlad Țepeș, whom the Pope held in high regard. Because of a lack of enthusiasm shown by Europeans for the crusade, Mehmed took the opportunity to take an offensive stand. Later that same year (1460), he captured the last independent Serbian city, Smederevo, and in 1461, he convinced the Greek despot of Morea to give up his stronghold; soon thereafter, its capital, Mistra, and Corinth followed suit and surrendered themselves without struggle.

Vlad Țepeș's only ally, Mihály Szilágyi, was captured in 1460 by the Turks while traversing Bulgaria. Szilágyi's men were tortured to death, while Szilágyi was sawed in half. Later that year, Mehmed sent envoys to Vlad to urge him to pay the delayed jizya. Vlad Țepeș provoked Mehmed by having the envoys killed and in a letter dated 10 September 1460, addressed to the Transylvanian Saxons of Kronstadt (today: Brașov), he warned them of Mehmed's invasion plans and asked for their support. Vlad Țepeș had not paid the annual jizya of 10,000 ducats since 1459. In addition to this, Mehmed asked him for 1,000 boys that were to be trained as janissaries. Vlad Țepeș refused the demand, and the Turks crossed the Danube and started to do their own recruiting, to which Vlad reacted by capturing the Turks and impaling them. The conflict continued until 1461, when Mehmed asked the Prince to come to Constantinople and negotiate with him.

At the end of November 1461, Vlad Țepeș wrote to Mehmed that he could not afford to pay the jizya, as his war against the Saxons of Transylvania had emptied his resources, and that he could not leave Wallachia and risk having the Hungarian king take over his domains. He further promised to send the Sultan plenty of gold when he could afford to and that he would go to Constantinople if the Sultan would send him a pasha to rule over Wallachia in his absence. Meanwhile, the Sultan received intelligence reports that revealed Vlad's alliance with Hungarian king, Matthias Corvinus. He sent the bey of Nicopolis, Hamza Pasha, to stage a diplomatic meeting with Vlad at Giurgiu, but with orders to ambush him there; and thereafter, take him to Constantinople. Vlad was forewarned about the ambush and planned to set an ambush of his own. Hamza brought with him 1,000 cavalry and when passing through a narrow pass north of Giurgiu, Vlad launched a surprise-attack. The Wallachians had the Turks surrounded and fired with their handgunners until the entire expedition-force was killed. Historians credit Vlad Țepeș as one of the first European crusaders to use gunpowder in a "deadly artistic way". In a letter to Corvinus, dated 11 February 1462, he wrote that Hamza Pasha was captured close to the former Wallachian fortress of Giurgiu. He then disguised himself as a Turk and advanced with his cavalry towards the fortress where he ordered the guards in Turkish to have the gates open. This they did and Vlad Țepeș attacked and destroyed the fortress. In his next move, he went on a campaign and slaughtered enemy soldiers and populations that might have sympathized with the Turks; first in southern Wallachia, then, in Bulgaria by crossing the frozen Danube. While in Bulgaria, he divided his army into several smaller groups and covered "some 800 kilometers in two weeks", as they killed over 23,000 Turks. In a letter to Corvinus, dated 11 February 1462, he stated:

I have killed peasants men and women, old and young, who lived at Oblucitza and Novoselo, where the Danube flows into the sea, up to Rahova, which is located near Chilia, from the lower Danube up to such places as Samovit and Ghighen. We killed 23,884 Turks without counting those whom we burned in homes or the Turks whose heads were cut by our soldiers...Thus, your highness, you must know that I have broken the peace with him (Sultan Mehmet II).

The Christian Bulgarians were spared and many of them were settled in Wallachia. His precise numbers were counted as such: At Giurgiu there were 6,414 victims; at Eni Sala, 1,350; at Durostor 6,840; at Orsova, 343; at Hârsova, 840; at Marotin, 210; at Turtucaia, 630; at Turnu, Batin, and Novograd, 384; at Sistov, 410; at Nicopolis and Ghighen, 1,138; at Rahova, 1,460. When hearing about the devastation, Mehmed—who was busy besieging a fortress in Corinth—sent his grand vizier, Mahmud, with an army of 18,000 to destroy the Wallachian port of Brăila. Vlad Țepeș turned back and defeated the army, and according to the Historia Turchesca of Giovanni Maria Angiolello, sometimes attributed to an Italian chronicler Donado da Lezze, only 8,000 Turks survived. Vlad Țepeș's campaign was celebrated among the Saxon cities of Transylvania, the Italian states, and the Pope. A Venetian envoy, upon hearing about the news at the court of Corvinus on 4 March, expressed great joy and said that the whole of Christianity should celebrate Vlad Țepeș's successful campaign. An English pilgrim to the Holy Land, William Wey, passing through the island of Rhodes while on his way home, wrote that "the military men of Rhodes, upon hearing of Vlad Țepeș's campaign, had Te Deum sung in praise and honour of God who had granted such victories....The lord mayor of Rhodes convened his brother soldiers and the whole citizenry feasted on fruit and wine." The Genoese from Caffa thanked Vlad Țepeș, for his campaign had saved them from an attack of some 300 ships that the sultan planned to send against them. Many Turks were now frightened of Vlad and left the European side of their empire and moved into Anatolia. Mehmed, when hearing about the events, abandoned his siege at Corinth and decided to go against Vlad Țepeș himself.

== Preparations for war ==
=== Turks ===
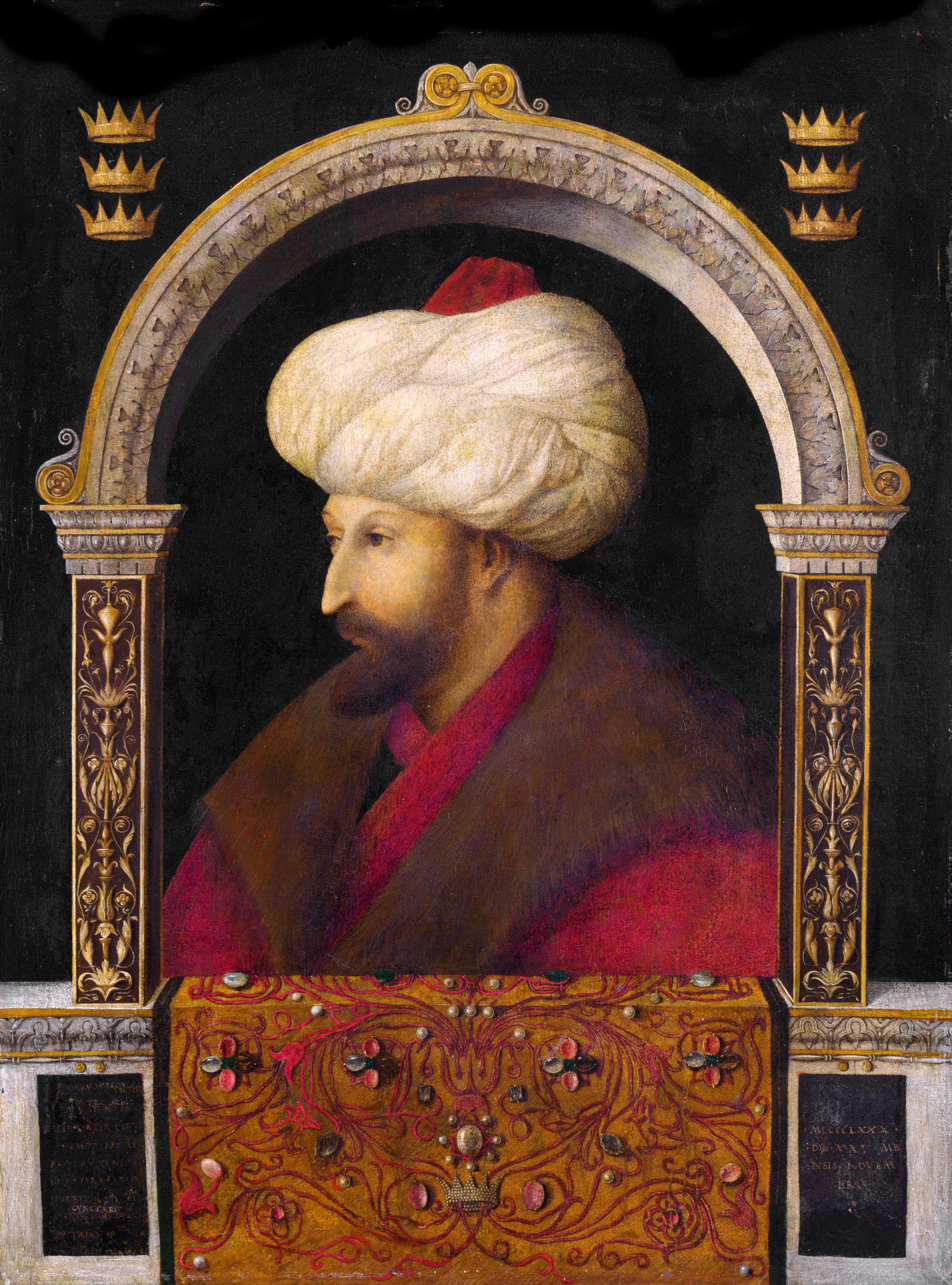
Mehmed II, picture by Gentile Bellini

Mehmed sent messengers in all directions to assemble an army, "which in numbers and armaments must have been equal to that which he had employed on the siege of Constantinople." On 26 April or 17 May 1462, the sultan moved with his army from Constantinople with the objective of conquering Wallachia. The Sultan himself wrote in a letter addressed to Ibrahim Bey of Qaraman that he had gone on the expedition with 15 tumens, a Turco-Mongol military unit traditionally consisting of 10,000 men at full strength. The Greek historian Laonikos Chalkokondyles wrote of Mehmed's army as "huge, second in size only to the one that this sultan had led against Constantinople." He estimated the force at 250,000, while the Turkish historian Tursun Bey mentioned 300,000. The same numbers were put by an anonymous Italian chronicle found in Verona, believed to have been written by a certain merchant named Cristoforo Schiappa. A letter of a Leonardo Tocco to Francesco I Sforza, duke of Milan, wrote that Mehmed had recruited 400,000 men from Rumelia and Anatolia, with 40,000 being constructors of bridges armed with axes. A smaller estimate of the size of the Turkish forces was made by the Venetian envoy at Buda, Tommasi, who mentioned a regular force of 60,000 and some 30,000 irregulars. These consisted of the janissaries (the elite slave troops); infantry soldiers; sipâhis (the feudal cavalry); saiales (the sacrificial units composed of slaves who would win their freedom if they survived); Akinji (the archers); silahdârs (the custodians of the sultan's weapons who also protected the flanks); azabs (the pikemen); beshlis (who handled the firearms) and the sultan's personal bodyguards. Vlad's half-brother, Radu the Handsome, who willingly served the sultan, commanded 4,000 horsemen. In addition to this, the Turks brought with them 120 cannon, engineers and workers that would build roads and bridges, priests of Islam (ulema) and muezzin, who called the troops to prayer, astrologers who consulted Mehmed and helped him make military decisions; and women "reserved for the night pleasures of the men." Chalkokondyles reported that the Danube shipowners were paid 300,000 gold pieces to transport the army. In addition to this, the Ottomans used their own fleet that consisted of 25 triremes and 150 smaller vessels.

=== Wallachians ===
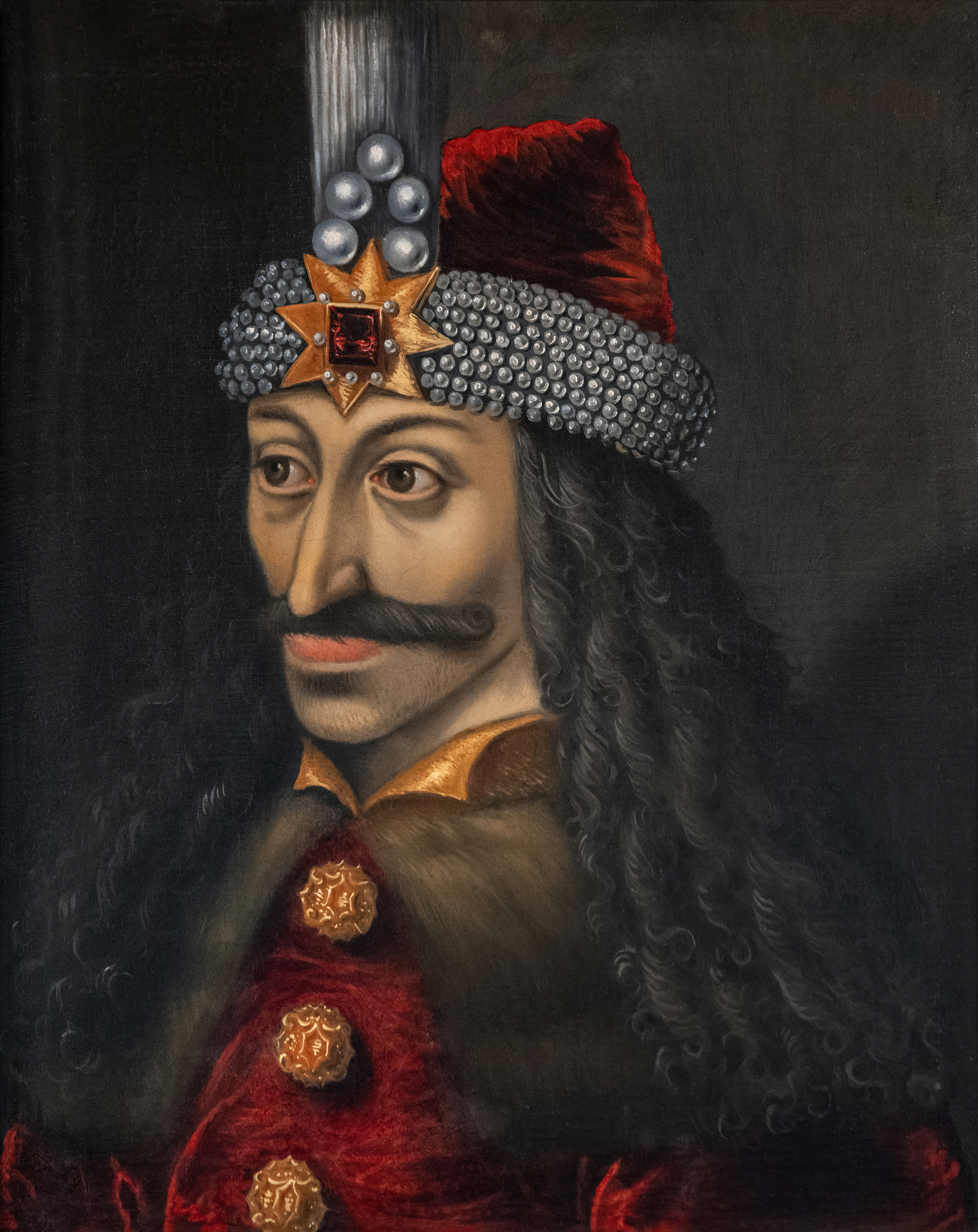
Vlad's portrait at Schloss Ambras, Innsbruck

Vlad Țepeș asked the Hungarian king for assistance. He received no support despite promises made by Corvinus and instead called for a mobilization that included "not only men of military age, but also of women and of children from the age of twelve up; and included Gypsy slave contingents." Various sources mention the strength of his army to be between 22,000 and 30,900, with the most popular accepted number set at 30,000. The letter of Leonardo Tocco which put the numbers of the Turkish army at an exaggerated strength of 400,000, exaggerated also the Wallachian strength which was estimated at 200,000. The majority of the army consisted of peasants and shepherds, while the boyars on horseback—who were few in numbers—were armed with lances, swords, and daggers and wore chainmail as armour. Vlad's personal guard consisted of mercenaries from many countries and some Gypsies. Before battle, it is believed that Vlad told his men that "it would be better that those who think of death should not follow me".

== Battle ==
The Turks first tried to disembark at Vidin, but were pushed back by an archery attack. On 4 June, a contingent of janissaries landed in the night, at Turnu Severin, where 300 of them died from Wallachian attacks. The Serbian-born janissary, Konstantin Mihailović, recounted their encounter with Vlad Țepeș:

When night began to fall, we climbed into our boats and floated down the Danube and crossed over to the other side several miles below the place where Vlad's army was stationed. There we dug ourselves trenches, so that cavalry could not harm us. After that we crossed back over to the other side and transported other janissaries over the Danube, and when the entire infantry had crossed over, then we prepared and set out gradually against Vlad's army, together with the artillery and other equipment that we had brought with us. Having halted, we set up the cannon, but not in time to stop three hundred janissaries from being killed ... Seeing that our side was greatly weakening, we defended ourselves with the 120 guns which we had brought over and fired so often that we repelled the prince's army and greatly strengthened our position ... Vlad, seeing that he could not prevent the crossing, withdrew. After that the emperor crossed the Danube with his entire army and gave us 30,000 coins to be distributed among us.

The Ottoman army managed to advance as Vlad Țepeș instituted a policy of scorched earth, poisoned the waters, and also created marshes by diverting the waters of small rivers. Traps were created by the digging of pits, and then covered with timber and leaves. The population and animals were evacuated to the mountains and as Mehmed advanced for seven days, his army suffered from fatigue as "he found no man, nor any significant animal, and nothing to eat or drink." Vlad adopted guerrilla tactics as his cavalry made several hit-and-run attacks. He would also send ill people suffering from lethal diseases, such as leprosy, tuberculosis—and in more significant numbers—those who suffered from the bubonic plague, to intermix with the Turks and infect them. The bubonic plague managed to spread in the Ottoman army. The Ottoman fleet launched a few minor attacks on Brăila and Chilia, but without being able to do much damage, as Vlad Țepeș had destroyed most of the ports in Bulgaria. Chalkokondyles writes that the Sultan managed to capture a Wallachian soldier and at first tried to bribe him for information; when that did not work, he threatened him with torture, to no avail. Mehmed was said to have commended the soldier by saying, "if your master had many soldiers like yourself, in a short time he could conquer the world!"

The Turks continued with their advance towards Târgoviște, after failing to capture the fortress of Bucharest and the fortified island of Snagov. On 17 June, when the Turks camped south of the capital, Vlad Țepeș launched his night attack with a portion of 24,000 troops, possibly only 7,000 to 10,000 horsemen. Chalkokondyles retells the story that, before making his attack, Vlad went freely into the Turkish camp disguised as a Turk, and wandered around to find the location of the Sultan's tent and learn about his organization. The anonymous Italian chronicle of Verona mentions that Mehmed had disallowed his soldiers to exit their tents during the night, as to not cause panic in case of an attack. The chronicle goes on explaining that Vlad Țepeș, being aware of Mehmed's strategy, had decided for an attack in the night, knowing how to proceed in his offensive when the enemy soldiers would have to remain in their tents. The skirmish would last from "three hours after sunset until four the next morning" and would cause great confusion in the Ottoman camp. The Wallachians made noise from their buglers and illuminated the battle with their torches; and in that night, they launched not one, but several attacks. Documents differ on the exact result of the skirmish: some sources say that the Wallachians slaughtered a great number of Turks, while others say the Ottoman losses were minimal. Many horses and camels were, however, killed. Some chronicles blame a Wallachian boyar named Galeș, who supposedly led a simultaneous attack on the Turks with a second army, for not being brave enough to cause the expected devastation on the enemy. Vlad Țepeș himself aimed for the tent of the sultan, as he routed the Asian cavalry, but mistakenly went for the tent of the two grand viziers Ishak Pasha and Mahmud Pasha.

A Wallachian point of view of the events was recorded by the papal legate, Niccolò Modrussa, years later at the court of Buda when Vlad was being imprisoned by Corvinus. It is said to have been told by a Wallachian veteran:

The sultan besieged him and discovered him in a certain mountain where the Wallachian was supported by the natural strength of the place. There Vlad had hidden himself along with 24,000 of his men who had willingly followed him. When Vlad realized that he would either perish from hunger or fall into the hands of the very cruel enemy, and considering both eventualities unworthy of brave men, he dared commit an act worthy of being remembered: calling his men together and explaining the situation to them, he easily persuaded them to enter the enemy camp. He divided the men so that either they should die bravely in battle with glory and honor or else, should destiny prove favorable to them, they should avenge themselves against the enemy in an exceptional matter. So, making use of some Turkish prisoners, who had been caught at twilight when they were wandering about imprudently, at nightfall Vlad penetrated into the Turkish camp with part of his troops, all the way up the fortifications. And during the entire night he sped like lightning in every direction and caused great slaughter, so much so that, had the other commander to whom he had entrusted his remaining forces been equally brave, or had the Turks not fully obeyed the repeated orders from the sultan not to abandon their garrisons, the Wallachian undoubtedly would have gained the greatest and most brilliant victory. But the other commander (a boyar named Galeș) did not dare attack the camp from the other side as had been agreed upon....Vlad carried out an incredible massacre without losing many men in such a major encounter, though many were wounded. He abandoned the enemy camp before daybreak and returned to the same mountain from which he had come. No one dared pursue him, since he had caused such terror and turmoil. I learned by questioning those who had participated in this battle that the sultan lost all confidence in the situation. During that night the sultan abandoned the camp and fled in a shameful manner. And he would have continued to this way, had he not been reprimanded by his friends and brought back, almost against his will.

The janissaries, under the command of Mihaloğlu Ali Bey, (Note: According to Yaşar Yücel-Ali Sevim the name of the Akıncı commander was Evrenos) pursued the Wallachians and killed 1,000–2,000 of them. Chalkokondyles claims that few men were killed on either side of the battle, though many Ottoman livestock were slaughtered. According to the chronicle of the Venetan bailo at the Porte, Domenico Balbi, the total casualties for the conflict are numbered as 5,000 for the Wallachian side and 15,000 for the Ottomans. Konstantin Mihailović, a Serbian Janissary present at the battle, states that several thousand Turks, alongside horses and camel, were massacred. Even though the morale of the sultan and his army was low, Mehmed decided to besiege the capital, but instead found it deserted with its gates wide open. The Turkish army entered the capital and for half an hour, the army marched on the road that was bordered by some 20,000 impaled Ottomans. There, they found the rotten corpse of Hamza Pasha impaled on the highest stake, to symbolize his 'high ranking'. Other sources say that the city was defended by the soldiers, while the impaled corpses lay outside the city-walls for a distance of 60 miles. Chalkokondyles, when remarking the reaction of the sultan, wrote: "The sultan was seized with amazement and said that it was not possible to deprive of his country a man who had done such great deeds, who had such a diabolical understanding of how to govern his realm and its people. And he said that a man who had done such things was worth much."

== Aftermath ==
Mehmed ordered for a deep trench to be dug out around the Turkish encampment in order to prevent enemy penetration and the following day (22 June), the Turks retreated. Around June 20, 1462, Vlad left a force of about 6,000 Wallachians with the mission "to stay hidden in the forests and, if anyone strayed, to immediately attack and crush him," while he, with the rest of his fighters, hurried to the other front. The 6,000 men who were monitoring the bulk of the sultan's army rushed to launch an attack when the withdrawal from Târgoviște began. The Turkish official "Yusuf," who probably commanded the rear guard, was defeated, but he was aided by Turahanoğlu Ömer Bey, who changed the odds of battle in favor of the Turks, killing approximately 2,000 Wallachians. A few days later, Vlad's cousin, Stephen III of Moldavia, who wanted to retake Akkerman and Chilia, decided to launch an attack on the latter. The Wallachians rushed to the scene with 7,000 men and managed to defend the town, while wounding Stephen in his foot by artillery fire. Vlad, who was returning from Chilia, met the Sultan's army near Buzău. The Wallachians attacked the Ottomans but were repelled with heavy losses. On June 29, the Sultan reached Brăila, which he burned down, and then sailed to Adrianople, where they arrived on 11 July. On 12 July, the Turks called for a celebration for their "Great victory" over Vlad Țepeș. The Turks had enslaved many of the local inhabitants, which they marched on their way south together with 200,000 cattle and horses.

== Popular culture ==
- French writer Victor Hugo wrote about the conflict in his poem La Légende des siècles (The Legend of the Centuries).
- The film Bram Stoker's Dracula begins in 1462 with the Ottoman invasion of Wallachia; a night battle (ostensibly this attack) takes place, ending with Vlad Țepeș's victory.
- The Big Finish Productions audio drama Son of the Dragon depicts the battle from the perspective of the Fifth Doctor and his companions.
- The 2014 film Dracula Untold includes an altered rendition of this attack, in which Dracula blocks the sun with black clouds instead of the battle occurring at night.
- In the video game Age of Empires II: The Forgotten, this attack is showcased in one of the final Dracula campaigns. After killing several Ottoman troops and suffering losses of his own, Dracula calls off the attack because he realizes Mehmed II fled the camp before the attack began.
- The TV series Rise of Empires: Ottoman depicts this battle in episodes 5 and 6 of its second season.

== See also ==
- Ottoman wars in Europe
