= Season of Love =

Season of Love or Seasons of Love may refer to:

== Film and television ==
- Season of Love (Singaporean TV series), a 1998 Singaporean television series
- Season of Love (Hong Kong TV series), a 2013 Hong Kong television series
- Seasons of Love (TV program), a 2014 Filipino television drama
- Seasons of Love (film), a 1999 Canadian miniseries
- Season of Love (2019 film), a 2019 Holiday-themed lesbian romantic comedy
- Season of Love (2024 film), a Turkish romance film
- Pyar Ka Mausam (lit. 'Season of Love'), a 1969 Indian Hindi-language film

== Music ==
- The Season of Love, album of the Contemporary Christian group 4 Him
- Seasons of Love (album), by Mad at the World
- "Seasons of Love", a song from the musical Rent
- "Season of Love", song by 98 Degrees
- "Season of Love" (song), Mai Kuraki's twenty-sixth single, released in 2007
- "Season of Love", song by Shiny Toy Guns from Season of Poison
