= Eva Dedova =

Kazakh-Turkish actress (born 1992)

- Born: 22 February 1992 (age 34); Almaty, Kazakhstan
- Occupation: Actress

Eva Dedova (born 22 February 1992) is a Kazakhstani and Turkish actress. She is German–Russian born in Kazakhstan. She grew up in Kazakhstan and Turkey. She studied radio, television and cinema and theatre department at Kadir Has University in Istanbul. She speaks Turkish, Russian, and English.

== Filmography ==
=== Television ===
- Çok Güzel Hareketler Bunlar
- 2011: Kavak Yelleri
- 2012: Yalan Dünya
- 2013: Mahmut ile Meryem
- 2014: Kurt Seyit ve Şura
- 2016: Babam ve Ailesi
- 2018: Mehmetçik Kut'ül Amare
- 2020: Rise of Empires: Ottoman
- 2021: Ada Masalı
- 2021: The Kazakh Business in Turkey
- 2023: Mitat
- 2023: Ya Çok Seversen

=== Commercials ===
- DeFacto
- Anadolu Hayat Sigorta
- Kent
- Arabam.com
