= Ottoman–Wallachian wars =

Wallachian campaign

- Battle of Argesh (1394)
- Battle of Rovine (1395)
- Crusade of Nicopolis (1396)
- Wallachian campaign (1420)
- Crusade of Varna (1444)
- Battle of Kosovo (1448)
- Vlad the Impaler's expedition across the Danube
- Battle near the Danube (1458/1462)
- Battle of Turnu
- Night attack at Târgoviște (1462)
- Battle of Buzău
- Long Turkish War
  - Battle of Călugăreni
  - Battle of Giurgiu
- Polish–Ottoman War (1672–1676)
  - Battle of Khotyn (1673)
- Wallachian uprising of 1821
- Wallachian Revolution of 1848
