= Battle of Rovine =

1395 battle between the Ottomans and Wallachians

- Part of the Ottoman wars in Europe and the Ottoman–Wallachian wars
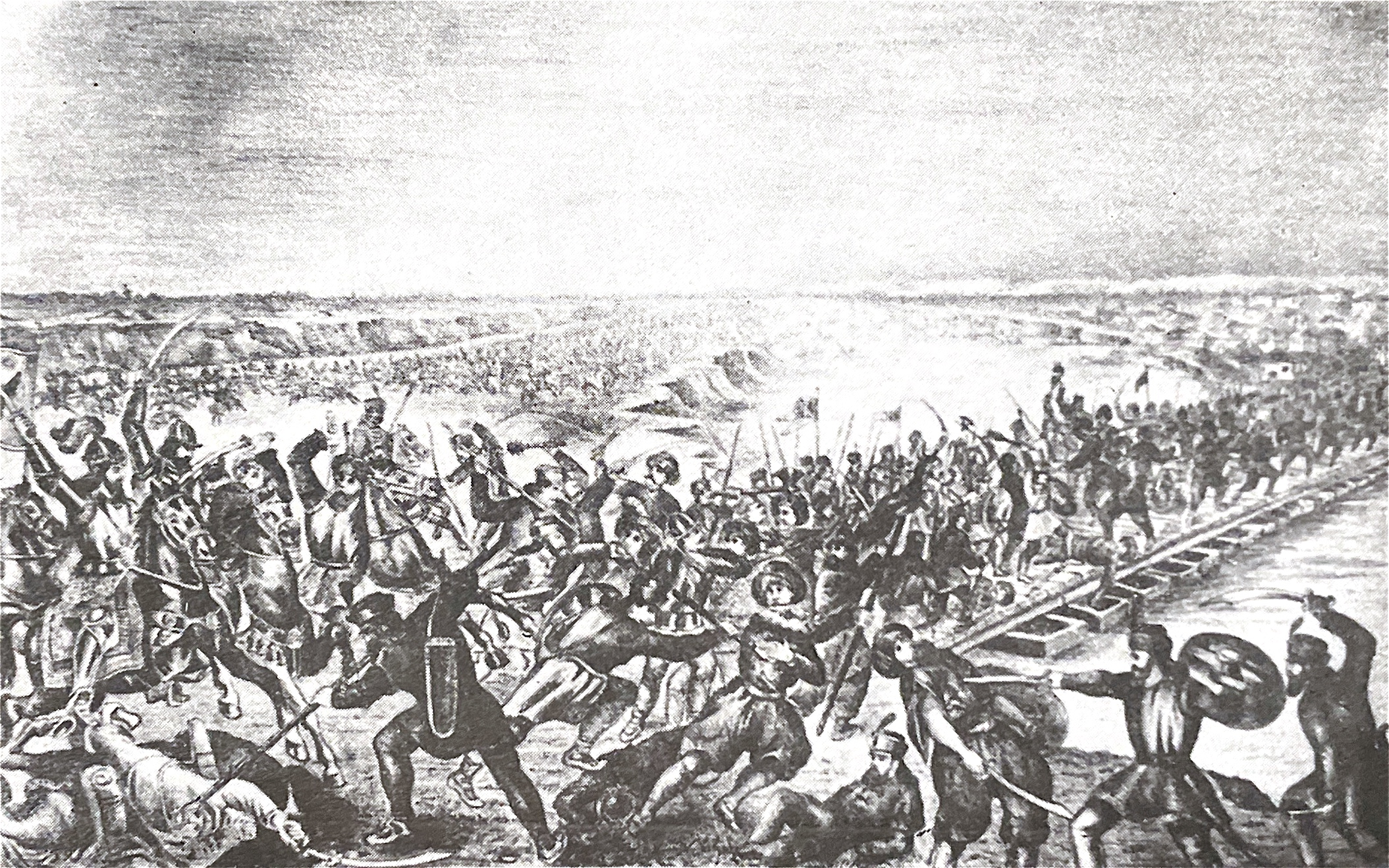
Date	17 May 1395
Location	Rovine, Wallachia
Result	Disputed

Belligerents
Principality of Wallachia	Ottoman Empire; Moravian Serbia; Lordship of Prilep; Principality of Velbazhd

Commanders and leaders
(Wallachia) Mircea I	(Ottoman Empire) Bayezid I Stefan Lazarević; Marko Mrnjavčević †; Andrijaš Mrnjavčević †; Konstantin Dejanović †; Konstantin Balšić

Strength
Unknown	Unknown

Casualties and losses
Heavy	Heavy

The Battle of Rovine took place on 17 May 1395. The Wallachian army led by Voivod Mircea the Elder opposed the Ottoman invasion personally led by Sultan Bayezid I the Thunderbolt. The Turkish force heavily outnumbered the Wallachian troops.

The legend says that on the eve of the battle, dressed as a peace emissary, Mircea cel Bătrân talked to Bayezid asking him to leave Wallachia and promised him safe passage back. The Sultan proudly insisted on fighting and later suffered a humiliating loss.

== Location ==
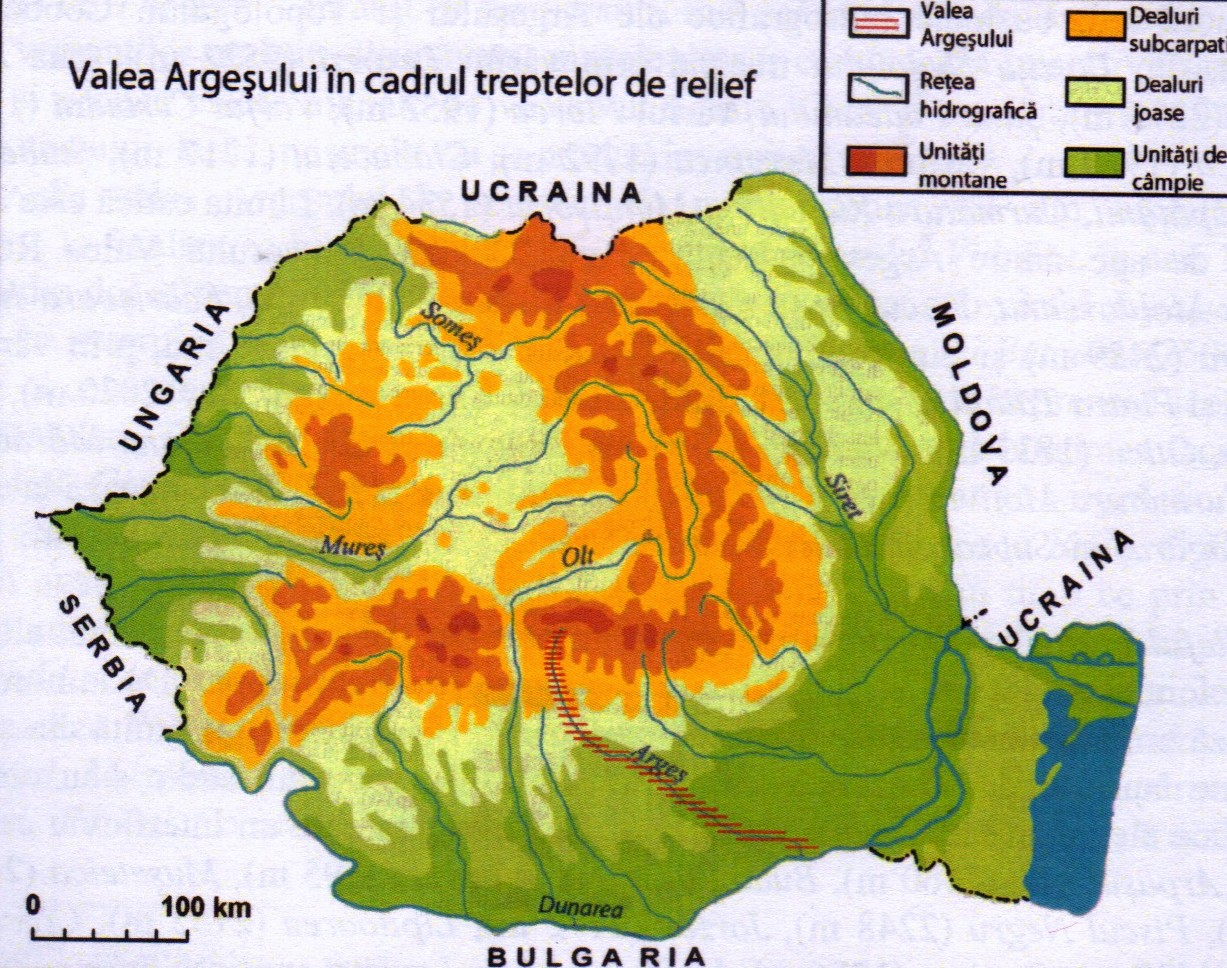
Map of modern Romania; the battle took place near the Argeș River (marked in red).

Idris Bitlisi referred to the battlefield as a "mountainous and dangerous place", but most sources suggest the battle occurred near the Argeș River.

== Battle ==
During the battle, a key tactical role was played by the Wallachian archers who severely depleted the Ottoman ranks during their initial attack. Bayezid's vassals, the Serbian lords Stefan Lazarević and Marko Mrnjavčević, two of the greatest knights of the time, participated and fought bravely; Stefan showed great courage, Marko was killed in action.

An alternative historical view is that the dramatic confrontation lasted not just a single day, but an entire week, being in the first stage of a war of positions. The fierce battle ended with heavy casualties for both sides, eventually, each army withdrew from the battlefield. Although the Wallachians pushed back the enemy, the Ottomans were able to defend their resulting position, relying on the personal guard of the Sultan composed of Janissaries. This was the impregnable position of the Ottoman defence a year later, in the famous Battle of Nicopolis. This tactical innovation became a fundamental element of the Ottoman war strategies until the 18th century. The army of Mircea, sustaining heavy casualties and unable to break the defense of the Sultan's camp, was finally obliged to withdraw. Because the Ottoman Empire was not able to conquer Wallachia at this time, Rovine remains one of the most important battles in Romanian history.

An epic description of the confrontation is presented in the poem "Scrisoarea a III-a" ("The Third Letter") written by the Romanian national poet, Mihai Eminescu. The Dečani chronicle describes the battle and reports that Prince Marko and Constantine Dragaš died fighting. The same source mentions that Marko's brother, Andreja Mrnjavčević, also perished during the fight.

== Result ==
Some historians record the battle as a Wallachian victory, whereas Tony Jaques, Halil İnalcık, Şerif Baştav and Jean Sedlar state the battle was an Ottoman victory. Other sources state the battle may have been inconclusive.

In the aftermath of the battle, news of victory for the Wallachians reached the Kingdom of Hungary, in Buda, and king Sigismund of Luxembourg was informed about it. The king went on to send his own version of the battle throughout Europe, making him appear as the victor of Mircea's battle, even though he didn't participate and didn't send any troops to help Mircea. Thus, the battle was mentioned in the chronicle of the French monk and cantor Michel Pintoin, author of a history of the reign of Charles VI of France. In his work, it is written that after news of victory had reached the king of France from Venice in July 1395, the king was overjoyed to hear this and the next day attended, alongside his family and high nobles, a Te Deum religious service in Notre Dame, where the church bells also rang, in order to thank God for this victory.

== See also ==
- Battle of Argeș

== Sources ==
- Barker, John W. (1969). Manuel II Palaeologus (1391-1425): A Study in Late Byzantine Statesmanship. Rutgers University Press. ISBN 9780813571126. "1395 Indecisive Battle of Rovine"
- Bartusis, Mark C. (1997). The Late Byzatine Army: Arms and Society, 1204-1453. University of Pennsylvania Press. ISBN 9780812216202. "The long siege was interrupted only by the indecisive battle of Rovine in Wallachia..."
- Boia, Lucian (2001). Romania:Borderland of Europe. Reaktion books.
- Bradbury, Jim (2004). The Routledge Companion to Medieval Warfare. Routledge. ISBN 978-0-415-22126-9.
- Brackob, A.K. (2023). Dracul – Of the Father: The Untold Story of Vlad Dracul. Histria Books.
- Fine, John Van Antwerp (1994). The Late Medieval Balkans: A Critical Survey from the Late Twelfth Century to the Ottoman Conquest. Ann Arbor: University of Michigan Press. ISBN 978-0-472-08260-5.
- Forter, Norman L.; Rostovsky, Demeter B. (1971). The Roumanian Handbook. Ayer Publishing. ISBN 978-0-405-02747-5.
- Grumeza, Ion (2010). The Roots of Balkanization: Eastern Europe C.E. 500-1500. Bloomsbury Academic.
- Hösch, Edgar (1972). The Balkans: A Short History from Greek Times to the Present Day. Crane, Russak.
- Inalcik, Halil (1992). "Bayezid I". Islam Ansiklopedisi (in Turkish).
- Mureşan, Dan Ioan (2004). Avant Nicopolis: observations sur la campagne de 1395 pour le contrôle du Bas-Danube. Archived from the original on 12 February 2009.
- Nicol, Donald M. (1993). The Last Centuries of Byzantium, 1261-1453. Cambridge University Press. ISBN 9780521439916. "...went into battle with the Turks at Rovine on 17 May 1395. Fighting as vassals on the Turkish side were the Serbian princes Stephen Lazarevic, Constantine Dragas, and Marko the son of Vukasin. Dragas and Marko were killed in the battle. The military outcome was indecisive..."
- Panaite, Viorel (2019). Ottoman Law of War and Peace: The Ottoman Empire and Its Tribute-Payers from the North of the Danube (2nd ed.). Brill. ISBN 978-90-04-40637-7.
- Sedlar, Jean W. (2013). East Central Europe in the Middle Ages, 1000-1500. Vol. 3. University of Washington Press.
- Schmitt, Oliver Jens (2001). Das venezianische Albanien (1392-1479) [Venetian Albania (1392–1479)] (in German). Oldenbourg. ISBN 978-3-4865-6569-0.
- Micea cel Mare: Scutul Europei (PDF). Bucharest: Editura Roza Vânturilor. 2009. ISBN 978-973-1735-20-7.
- Diță, Alexandru V. (2008). "Chronique du religieux de Saint-Denis sur la bataille de Rovine (17 mai 1395)" (PDF). Revue Roumaine d'Histoire. XLVII (3–4). Editura Academiei Române.
