= Battle of Argeș =

Part of the Ottoman-Wallachian wars

- Part of the Ottoman wars in Europe and the Ottoman–Wallachian wars
Date	10 October 1394
Location	Near the Argeș River, Romania
Result	Disputed

Belligerents
Principality of Wallachia	Ottoman Empire; Moravian Serbia

Commanders and leaders
(Wallachia) Mircea I	(Ottoman Empire) Bayezid I Stefan Lazarević

Strength
Unknown	Unknown

Casualties and losses
Unknown	Unknown

The Battle of Argeș was a battle fought between the Wallachian army under the command of Mircea I and the Ottoman army under the command of Bayezid I on 10 October 1394.

== Background ==
Following their first encounter in 1392, Mircea accepted Ottoman sovereignty and the payment of tribute. Mircea's envoys traveled to the Ottoman capital, Edirne, in 1392/93. They appeared before Bayezid and declared on behalf of Mircea that Wallachia would obey the Ottoman Empire. Later, Wallachia reneged on its promise of obedience to the Ottomans. It neither recognized Ottoman sovereignty nor paid taxes. Consequently, Bayezid I launched an expedition against Wallachia in 1394. Before attacking Wallachia, Bayezid attacked and plundered Southern Transylvania.

== The battle ==
In the autumn of 1394, after a raiding campaign along the right bank of the Danube, Bayezid launched the attack on Wallachia. He commanded the Ottoman Rumelian army, and the armies of his Balkan vassals, most of which were Bulgarians and Serbs under Stefan Lazarević, the son of the late Serbian prince Lazar. The armies crossed the Danube at Nicopolis, and advanced along the Argeș River with the intention of capturing Curtea de Argeș, the capital city of Wallachia. After a weeklong march in which the constant Wallachian attacks took their toll, the Wallachian army met the Ottomans on October 10.

== Result ==
While some historians record the battle as a Wallachian victory, others state that the battle was an Ottoman victory and record that Wallachia was brought under Ottoman rule. The belligerents would fight again in the Battle of Rovine on 17 May 1395.

== See also ==
- Battle of Rovine

== Sources ==
- Cârciumaru, Radu (2011). "Historiographic Views on the so-called Battle of "Rovine" and its Consequences of Mircea the Elder's Rule". Annales d'Université "Valahia" Târgovişte. Section d'Archéologie et d'Histoire. 13 (2). doi:10.3406/valah.2011.1092.
- Chrýsīs, Nikolaos G.; Carr, Mike (2014). Contact and conflict in Frankish Greece and the Aegean, 1204-1453: Crusade, Religion and Trade between Latins, Greeks and Turks. Farnham, Surrey, UK Burlington, VT: Ashgate. p. 188. ISBN 978-1-4094-3926-4.
- Mircea Dogaru: Un principe intre crestini, in "Lumea Magazin", nr.1, 2003.
- Guboglu, Mihail P. (1969). LE TRIBUT PAYÉ PAR LES PRINCIPAUTÉS ROUMAINES À LA PORTE JOSQU'AU DÉBUT DU XVIe SIÈCLE (*) (in French).
- Gwatkin, Henry Melvill, ed. (1923). The Cambridge Medieval History: The Eastern Roman empire. Cambridge at the University Press.
- İnalcık, Halil (2008). The Ottoman Empire: 1300-1600. Weidenfeld and Nicolson. ISBN 9780892413881.
- İnalcık, Halil (2009). Devlet-i'Aliyye Osmanlı İmparatorluğu Üzerine Araştırmalar-I (in Turkish) (27 (August) ed.). İstanbul: Türkiye İş Bankası Kültür Yayınları. p. 68.
- Page, Melvin E., ed. (2003). "Chronologies". Colonialism: An International Social, Cultural, and Political Encyclopedia. Vol. 3. ABC-CLIO. ISBN 1-57607-335-1.
- Somel, Selcuk Aksin (2003). Historical Dictionary of the Ottoman Empire. Scarecrow Press. ISBN 978-0810843325.
- Sugar, Peter (1977). Southeastern Europe Under Ottoman Rule, 1354–1804. University of Washington Press. ISBN 0-295-96033-7.
