= Emrah Safa Gürkan =

Turkish Historian (born 1981)

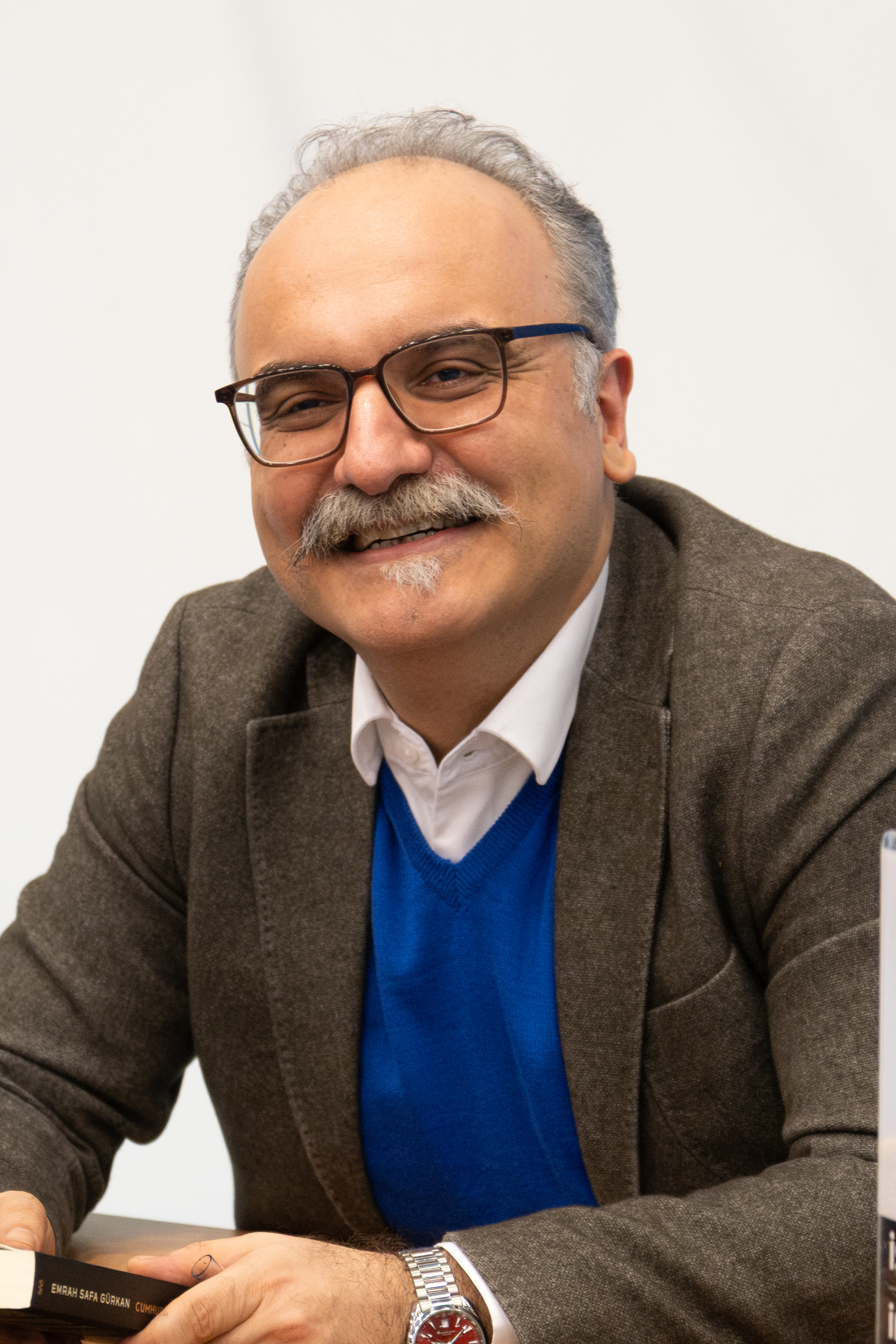
- Gürkan in 2025
- Born: 16 January 1981 (age 45); Değirmendere, Gölcük, Turkey
- Occupation: Historian
- Spouse: Elif Ertekin Gürkan
- Children: 2

Academic background
- Education: Georgetown University; Bilkent University
- Doctoral advisor: Gábor Ágoston

Academic work
- Sub-discipline: Ottoman history Mediterranean history
- Institutions: Istanbul 29 Mayıs University

Emrah Safa Gürkan (born 16 January 1981) is a Turkish public intellectual and historian. He is a professor at Istanbul 29 Mayıs University and specializes in Ottoman studies.

== Early life and education ==
Emrah Safa Gürkan was born on January 16, 1981, in Değirmendere, Kocaeli, Turkey. He graduated with a B.A. in International Affairs from Bilkent University in 2003. He continued his studies at Bilkent, earning a Master's degree in History in 2006 under the supervision of Ottoman historian Halil İnalcık. His Master's thesis was titled Ottoman Corsairs in the Western Mediterranean and Their Place in the Ottoman-Habsburg Rivalry, 1505–1535. He then attended Georgetown University, where he completed his Doctorate in 2012 with a dissertation on early modern espionage, Espionage in the 16th Century Mediterranean: Secret Diplomacy, Mediterranean Go-Betweens and the Ottoman-Habsburg Rivalry.

Gürkan's research focuses on the early modern Mediterranean, covering topics such as espionage, piracy, slavery, religious conversion, naval technology, and the relationship between the Ottoman Empire and the West. He has published articles in multiple languages, including English, Turkish, Italian, Spanish, and German. He has also authored two scientific monographs, the first of which received an award Scientific Monograph of the Year Award from the Turkish Academy of Sciences (TÜBA). Gürkan also received an award Outstanding Young Scientist Award from the same institution and another award Promising Scientist Award at the 14th Kadir Has Awards.

Gürkan served as a historical consultant for the TV series Fatih and Rise of Empires: Ottoman. In 2011, he co-founded the Ottoman History Podcast with Chris Gratien. The website features more than 400 interviews in four languages with various researchers.

== Awards ==
- Turkish Academy of Sciences, Outstanding Young Scientist Award (2018)
- 14th Kadir Has Awards, Promising Scientist Award (2018)
- Turkish Academy of Sciences, Scientific Monograph of the Year (2018) – Sultanın Casusları

== Selected works ==
- Cumhuriyetin 100 İsmi: Büyük Devrimin Portreleri (The 100 Names of the Republic: The Portraits of the Great Revolution, İstanbul: Kronik, 2023)
- Cumhuriyet'in 100 Günü: İnkılabın Ayak Sesleri (The 100 Days of the Republic: The Footsteps of the Revolution, İstanbul: Kronik, 2023)
- Ezbere Yaşayanlar: Vazgeçemediğimiz Alışkanlıkların Kökenleri (The Parrot-fashion Lives: The Origins of our Compelling Habits, İstanbul: Kronik, 2022)
- Bunu Herkes Bilir: Tarihteki Yanlış Sorulara Doğru Cevaplar (Everybody Knows It: The Right Answers to the Wrong Questions in History, İstanbul: Kronik, 2020)
- Sultanın Korsanları: Osmanlı Akdenizi’nde Gazâ, Yağma ve Esaret, 1500 – 1700 (The Pirates of the Sultan: Holy War, Booty and Slavery in the Ottoman Mediterranean, 1500 – 1700, İstanbul: Kronik, 2018)
- Sultanın Casusları: 16. Yüzyılda İstihbarat, Sabotaj ve Rüşvet Ağları (The Spies of the Sultan: Intelligence, Sabotage and Bribery in the 16th century, İstanbul: Kronik, 2017)
- Osmanlı İstanbulu: Uluslararası Osmanlı İstanbulu Sempozyumu Bildirileri (Istanbul: İstanbul 29 Mayıs University Publishing, 2014–2018), 5 vol., with Feridun Emecen and Ali Akyıldız.
