= Battle of Turnu =

1462 Ottoman victory in Romania

- Part of the Ottoman–Wallachian wars
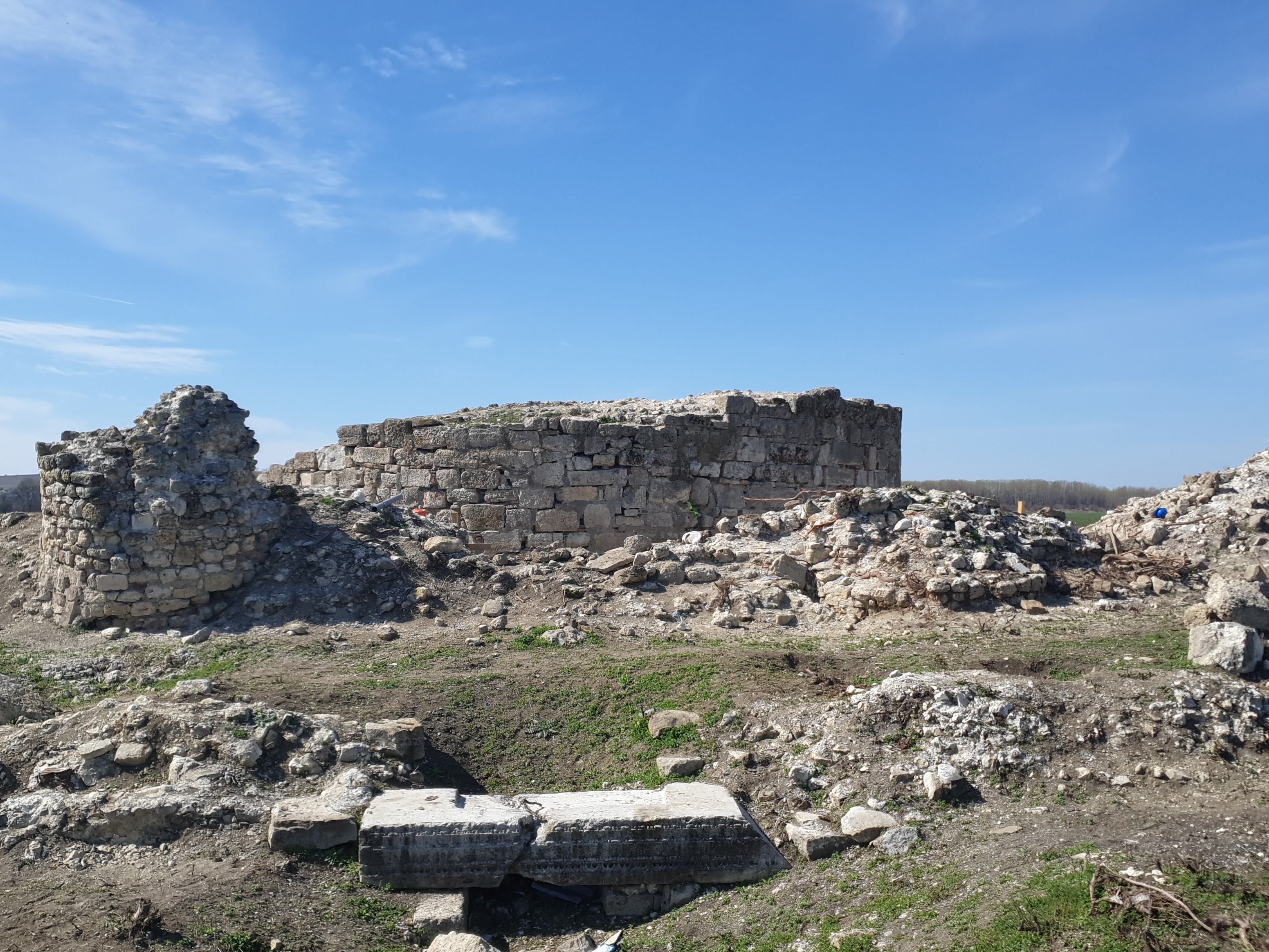
- Turnu Castle
Date	3/4 June 1462
Location	Turnu, Wallachia (today Turnu Măgurele, Romania)
Result	Ottoman victory

Belligerents
Ottoman Empire	Principality of Wallachia

Commanders and leaders
Mehmed II	(Wallachia) Vlad III

Strength
15,000; 120 cannons 80 boats	7,000–10,000 many cannons

Casualties and losses
250 Janissary	Heavy

The Battle of Turnu was a military conflict in 1462 between the army of Vlad III, who sought to prevent the crossing of the Danube, and the Ottoman army of Mehmed II. What began as an amphibious crossing operation evolved into a full-scale battle. Vlad retreated from the battle and adapted a new tactic.

== Background ==
Following the attacks launched by the Wallachian voivode into the Ottoman territories in early 1462, the Sultan launched a campaign against Wallachia in May. The Ottoman army, led by Mehmed himself, amassed 15 divisions of soldiers.

The Prince of Wallachia, who was well acquainted with Ottoman tactics and strategies, believed that the Ottoman armies would not head toward Vidin or Belgrade. Instead, he anticipated that Mehmed II would bring his ships to the Danube and assemble his land army in Philippopolis. Based on this assessment, Vlad began to implement his own defensive plan. His objective was to try to stop Mehmed II at the Danube, delay him through a river-crossing operation, and prevent his advance.

Having failed to mobilize the population, Vlad had to rely on his small army, which numbered around 7,000 to 10,000 soldiers consisting mainly of courtiers, boyars and some mercenaries. Apart from a few Transylvanian units and the weak promises of assistance from Matthias Corvinus, Vlad had no other support.

As for the Ottoman army, Doukas mentions 150,000 soldiers, while Chalkokondyles adds another 100,000. However, these figures are exaggerated, as was the case with many medieval battles. Even if we consider the recorded numbers to be inflated, the army was undoubtedly extremely large, with modern estimates ranging between 25,000 and 35,000 men.

Mehmed II divided his land forces into two. Only the central units remained with the Sultan. He continued his advance from Philippopolis with a force of 15,000 men.

== Battle ==
According to contemporary accounts, reaching Nicopolis on the banks of the Danube, the Ottoman army saw Vlad on the opposite side of the river. Mehmed II addressed his army, which at that moment consisted only of the Janissaries: "My soldiers! This concerns not only me, but also you and the state treasury. Give me your counsel, for it is in your hands whether we cross to the other side and engage the enemy." The Janissaries replied, "My Sultan, have the boats prepared; we will risk our lives to cross to the opposite bank by night." Eighty boats were prepared for them, along with equipment such as grenades, firearms, arrows, and bows. The attack began on the night of 3/4 June.

In order to prevent the enemy from noticing, Mehmed II attempted to carry out the crossing at a section of the river where the current was strong and the sound of the water loud. Once ashore, the Janissaries advanced to within 100 meters of Vlad III's camp. There, they dug trenches to position their cannons and surrounded themselves with shields and field fortifications to protect against Wallachian cavalry units.

The Janissaries who had crossed came under artillery fire from the entrenched Wallachian troops. During this attack, around 250 Janissaries were killed. Watching the events unfold from the opposite bank, Mehmed II saw that the battle was turning against him and that many Janissaries had fallen, which deeply distressed him. He then had about 120 cannons brought across the river and subjected the Wallachian forces to heavy bombardment, bringing their ongoing assault to an end. When additional reinforcements joined the battle, Vlad was forced to withdraw from his position. The Ottoman army subsequently crossed the Danube in full force.

== See also ==
- Night attack at Târgoviște
