= Hamza Bey Mosque =

Former mosque in Thessaloniki, Greece

- Αλκαζάρ Θεσσαλονίκης
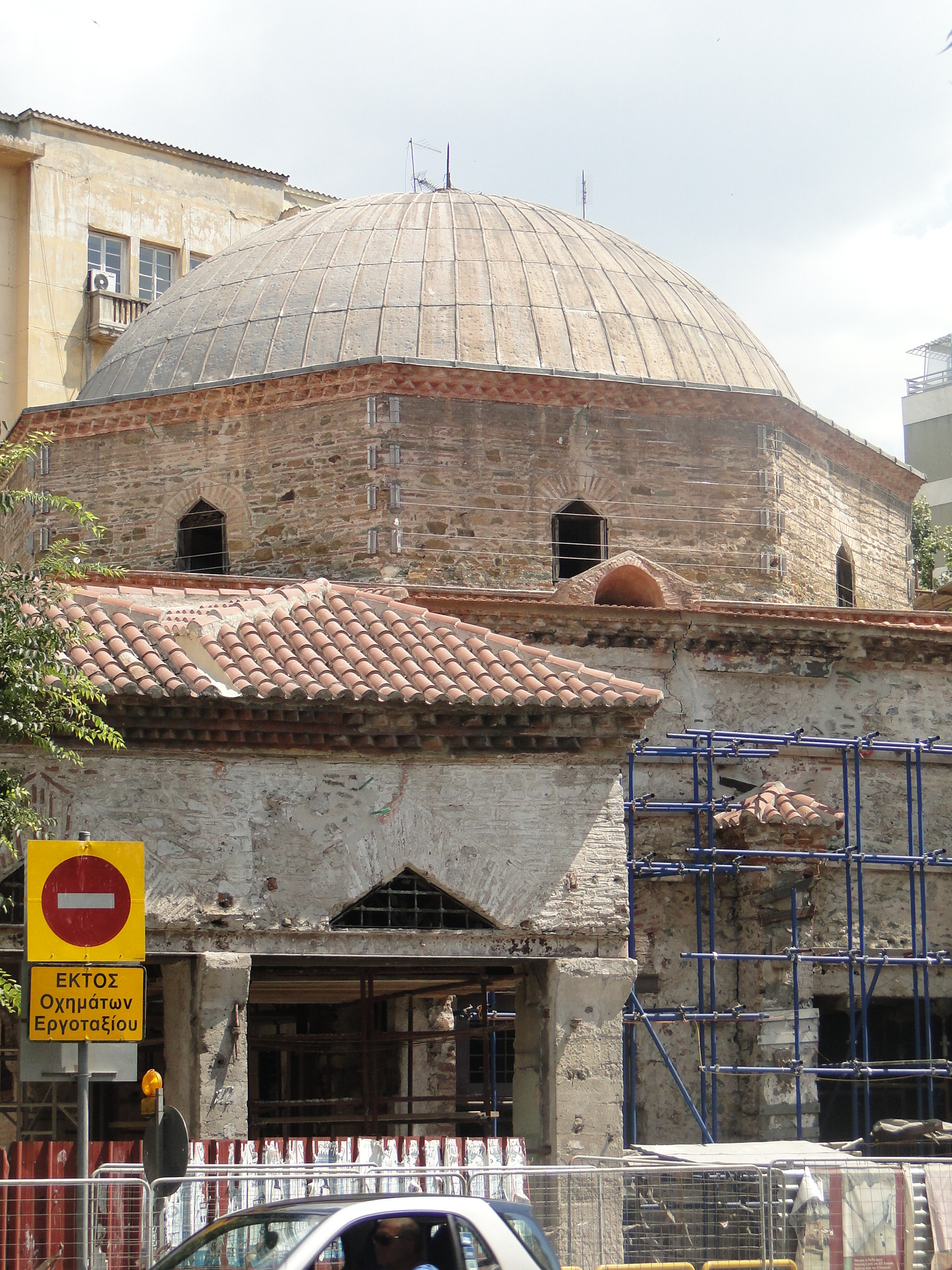
- The former mosque

- Location of the former mosque in Greece

Religion
- Affiliation: Islam (former)
- Ecclesiastical or organisational status: Mosque (1460–1820s)
- Status: Abandoned (as a mosque); Repurposed (for cultural use)

Location
- Location: Thessaloniki, Central Macedonia
- Country: Greece
- Interactive map of Hamza Bey Mosque
- Coordinates: 40°38′15″N 22°56′30″E

Architecture
- Type: Mosque
- Style: Ottoman
- Completed: 1460

Specifications
- Dome: 1
- Minaret: 1 (destroyed)
- Materials: Brick; stone

The Hamza Bey Mosque (Greek: Αλκαζάρ Θεσσαλονίκης, Turkish: Hamza Bey Camii) is a former mosque in Thessaloniki, in the Central Macedonia region of Greece. Built between 1467-1468, during the Ottoman era, the mosque was abandoned in the 1820s. Modern Thessalonians commonly know it as Alkazar, after a cinema that operated in the premises for decades.

== Overview ==
It was built by order of Hafsa Hatun, the daughter of Isa Bey Evrenosoğlu, but named after Hamza Bey, the Beylerbey of Rumeli. It was damaged in later earthquakes and fires and was rebuilt in 1620, and a madrasa was added.

Following the population exchange between Greece and Turkey, the mosque no longer functioned as a religious building and became the property of the National Bank of Greece. It initially housed various military services, and although it was declared a protected monument in 1926, it was sold in 1928 to private owners. The building was subsequently used for several decades as a cinema, and suffered extensive modifications. The mosque was handed over to the Greek Ministry of Culture in 2006, and restoration work commenced. In 2025, Lina Mendoni announced that restorations were on track to be completed by mid-2026. In October 2026, restorations were finished and it reopened to the public.

The mosque is covered by a dome and it had a minaret that was removed after 1923.

== See also ==
- Islam in Greece
- List of former mosques in Greece
- Ottoman Greece
