= Netherlands country of origin information reports =

Recurring government report

Netherlands country of origin information reports are official documents produced by the Netherlands Ministry of Foreign Affairs to provide factual assessments of conditions in asylum seekers countries of origin.

Known in Dutch as algemene ambtsberichten (general official reports) and thematische ambtsberichten (thematic official reports), these reports serve as key references for the Immigration and Naturalisation Service (IND) and courts in asylum decision making.

== History ==
Regular publications began with the formalization of refugee policy in the Netherlands in the early 1990s. These reports are prepared by the Official Reports Department (Afdeling Ambtsberichten) of the Ministry of Foreign Affairs. They are generally written according to terms of reference (TOR) prepared by the Department of Immigration and Citizenship (IND); however, the Minister of Foreign Affairs may also initiate the preparation of these reports independently if necessary.

== Purpose and legal status ==
The reports were prepared primarily at the request of the Ministry of Justice and Security to provide information on country-specific asylum policies and individual protection requests. Dutch courts consider them to be authoritative expert assessments, giving them significant weight in judicial proceedings.

== Report categories and scope ==
Reports fall into two main categories:

- General Official Reports (algemene ambtsberichten) cover comprehensive country situations including political context, security, environment, human rights, documentation, military service, and return issues.
- Thematic Official Reports (thematische ambtsberichten) address specific topics such as military service obligations or security conditions in particular regions.

== Methodology ==
The information included in the reports is carefully evaluated using a variety of trustworthy sources. When sources may have potential biases, corroboration with other evidence is sought, and any uncertainties are explicitly mentioned. Publicly accessible sources are cited clearly in footnotes by name, whereas confidential sources are referenced as vertrouwelijke bron (Dutch term for confidential source). Priority is given to the most authoritative versions available, which are often the original language texts.

== Access and publication ==
The reports can be accessed on the official government website and platforms such as ecoi.net.

== Country reports ==
Country	Report Type (NL)	Report Type (EN)	Publication Date	Title
Afghanistan	Algemeen ambtsbericht	General official report	March 2019	Algemeen ambtsbericht Afghanistan
Iraq	Thematisch ambtsbericht	Thematic official report	November 2025	Thematisch ambtsbericht Irak
Libya	Algemeen ambtsbericht	General official report	February 2023	Algemeen ambtsbericht Libië
Somalia	Algemeen ambtsbericht	General official report	March 2025	Algemeen ambtsbericht Somalië
Sudan	Algemeen ambtsbericht	General official report	December 2025	Algemeen ambtsbericht Soedan
Syria	Algemeen ambtsbericht	General official report	May 2025	Algemeen ambtsbericht Syrië
Turkey	Algemeen ambtsbericht	General official report	February 2025	Algemeen ambtsbericht Turkije
Yemen	Algemeen ambtsbericht	General official report	April 2025	Algemeen ambtsbericht Jemen
