= Vlad the Impaler's expedition across the Danube =

Vlad's expedition against Ottomans in 1461–1462

- Part of the Ottoman–Wallachian wars
Date	December 1461 – January 1462
Location	Giurgiu and Danube area, Ottoman Empire
Result	Wallachian victory

Belligerents
Wallachia	Ottoman Empire

Commanders and leaders
Vlad III; Neagoe of Craiova	(Ottoman Empire) Hamza Bey (executed) (Ottoman Empire) Yunus Bey (executed)

Strength
At least three army corps	Unknown

Casualties and losses
Unknown	Over 23,884 killed or impaled 50 Turkish transport ships raided and burned

Vlad the Impaler's expedition across the Danube or the Battle of Giurgiu was a military expedition carried out by the Wallachian forces of Vlad the Impaler with the goal of undermining the Ottoman Empire. It took place from December 1461 to January 1462, resulting in heavy losses for the Ottoman army and mass impalement of numerous people, including Ottoman commanders Hamza Pasha and Yunus Bey.

== Prelude ==
In 1459, Pope Pius II supported a planned anti-Ottoman crusade, which was going to be led by Hungarian king Matthias Corvinus. Wallachian voivode Vlad III rallied with this idea, ending tribute payments to the Ottoman Empire. Sultan Mehmed II was unable to immediately respond to disobedience of the Wallachian voivode, instead assigning Hamza Bey with the task of taking down Vlad.

According to Byzantine chronicler Laonikos Chalkokondyles, Sultan Mehmed II ordered Vlad to continue Wallachian tribute payments to the porte, in addition to also sending 500 children. However, Vlad refused to comply with these demands.

== Expedition ==
Invasion route and areas attacked by Vlad's army.

In December 1461, Ottoman commanders Hamza Bey and Yunus Bey intended to ambush and capture Vlad the Impaler in the Danube area. Their plan had failed, as the Ottoman army was defeated by Wallachian forces, with Hamza Pasha and Yunus Bey subsequently impaled after getting sent to Târgoviște as prisoners.

After the elimination of Hamza Pasha and Yunus Bey, Vlad's forces raided the Giurgiu fortress and settlements across the south Danube. Chronicler Laonikos Chalkokondyles stated that the Wallachians were "completely destroying the inhabitants, together with their women and children, and set fire to their houses, burning everything where they went". Later on, Vlad ordered in fluent Turkish to the garrison commander of Giurgiu to open the entrance into the fortress, with the commander complying to this order. The Ottoman garrison was subsequently slaughtered and fortress was sacked, with Vlad's Danube expedition concluding on January 1462.

During the expedition, Vlad divided his army into 6 columns, which spread 600km across the Danube attacking forts and localities. These attacks prevented the mobilization of the local Ottoman akinji troops as many of the targeted areas were important strongholds for them. Sometime in March of 1462, Wallachians attacked around 50 Turkish ships which were carrying lumber for the construction of galleys. The crews were slaughtered and some of the ships were set ablaze.

== Aftermath ==
The Wallachian forces of Vlad the Impaler successfully devastated the settlements across the Danube and sacked Giurgiu fortress. In February 1462, Vlad in his letter to Matthias Corvinus claimed to have killed over "23,884 Turks and Bulgarians" as a result of his expedition. In the same letter, he provides a breakdown by location for some of the killings: At Oblucitza and Novoselo, 1,350; at Durostor, Cirtal, and Drido-potrom, 6,840; at Orsova, 343; at Vectrem, 840; at Turtucaia, 630; at Marotim, 210; at Giurgiu, 6,414; at Turnu, Batin and Novigrad, 384; at Sistov, 410; At Nicopolis, Samovit, and Ghighen, 1,138; at Rahova, 1,460.

The goals of Vlad's Danube expedition was to frighten the Ottoman forces and eliminate their defenses on both banks of the river, burning the crossings into Wallachia in hopes of preventing Ottoman punitive campaigns. However, Vlad's provocations subsequently led Sultan Mehmed II personally leading his army into Wallachia in order to oust Vlad from power.
