= Battle of Giurgiu (1854) =

1854 battle during the Crimean War

- Part of the Crimean War
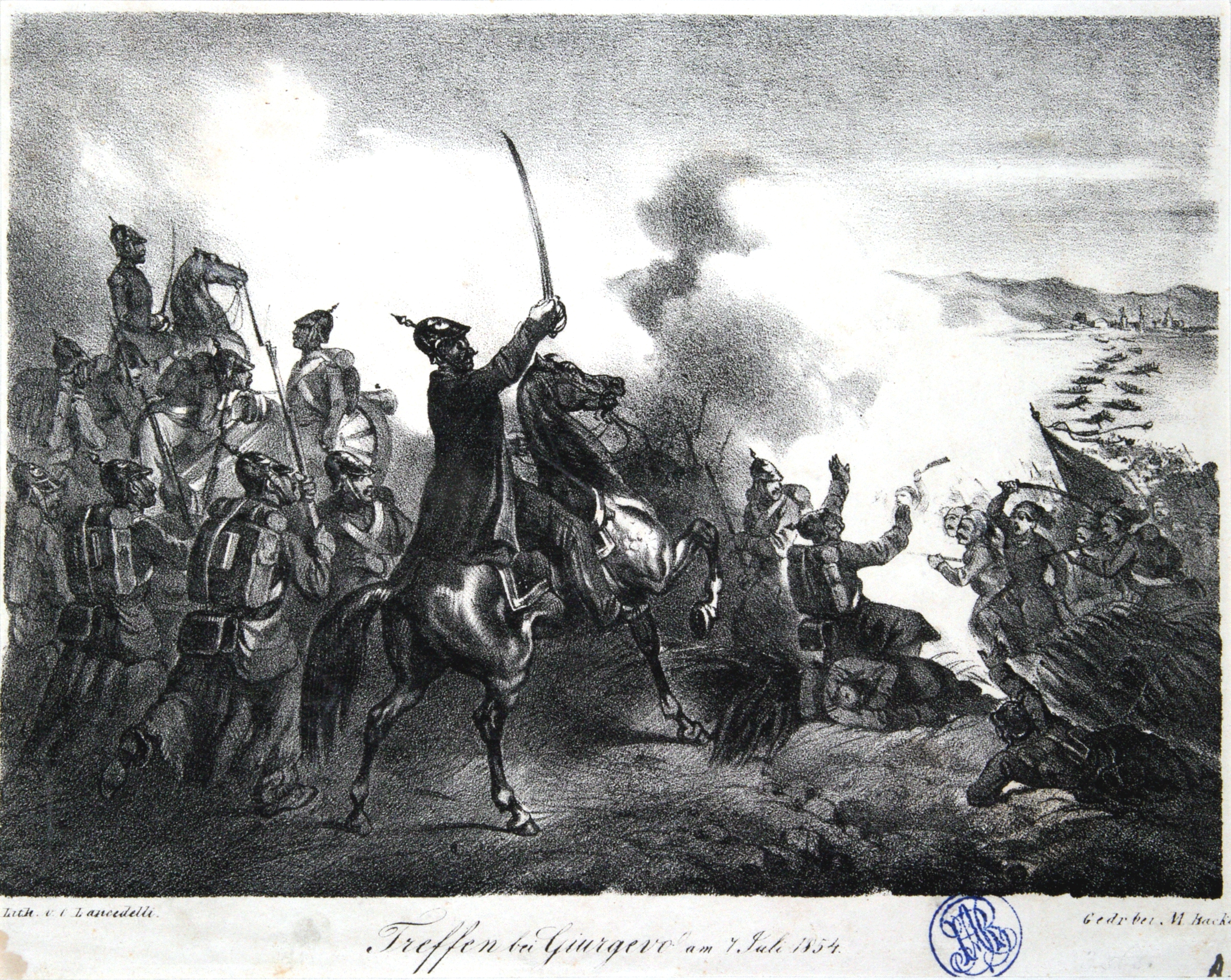
Date	3–8 July 1854
Location	Giurgiu, Ottoman Empire
Result	Ottoman victory

Belligerents
Ottoman Empire	Russian Empire

Commanders and leaders
Fuad Pasha	Fyodor Soymonov; Alexander Baumgarten; Stepan Khrulev

Strength
30,000	6,000

Casualties and losses
Unknown	1,800

The battle of Giurgiu took place during the Crimean War at islands near Giurgiu between 3–8 July 1854 and resulted in an Ottoman victory.

== Battle ==
After the Russian Southern Army on June 23 lifted the siege of Silistria and began to withdraw to the north bank of the Danube, the Turkish marshal Omar Pasha began to pull his forces together near Rusçuk to ford the river and recapture Wallachia. Prince Gorchakov, commander of the Southern Army, reinforced the detachment of Lieutenant General Fyodor Soymonov with an infantry brigade, two batteries and the Pavlograd Hussar Regiment who were idle at Giurgiu. A detachment of Major-General Alexander Baumgarten (who had under his command the Tobolsk 38th Infantry Regiment, one battery and a squadron of lancers) was also sent to reinforce Giurgiu. The Russians also moved the 11th Infantry Division from the Katarzhi to Bucharest. By 3 July, Omar had moved more than 30,000 men to Rusçuk under the command of Mehmed Fuad Pasha and opened fire on Giurgiu on the same day. The next day Soymonov took a battalion with 8 guns to the island of Rodoman, lying on the north bank of the Danube southwest of Giurgiu.

On 5 July, the Turks, commanded by crossed to Makan Island using a steamship and 18 boats, where they began building batteries. On 7 July, the Turks, under cover of fire from all the batteries, began a simultaneous crossing to Rodoman, Makan, and to Giurgiu. On the largest island (Rodoma), the first attack was repulsed by three battalions of Tomsk 39th Infantry Regiment's Lieutenant-General Stepan Khrulev. Soymonov sent two battalions of the Tobolsk regiment to relieve Khrulev's force. The skirmish, which at times turned into hand-to-hand combat, lasted into the night.

The troops fought in the most unfavorable conditions, some units were three days without hot food, the wounded were taken away under the scorching sun, without bandages. The Russian soldier stopped trusting the rifle, seeing how much worse it was than the enemy's: "The soldiers know how to deal with the bayonet perfectly, but they shoot hastily, without aiming, with little reliance on their rifle," says a participant in the battle. And makes a general conclusion: "We need better rifles so that we can cope with the Turks."

On the night of 8 July, Soymonov, finding his position disproportionate to the number of troops, ordered the destruction of the bridge connecting the island of Rodoman with the left bank of the Danube, and withdrew his detachment first to Giurgiu, and then to the heights near Frătești. The Russians lost 1,800 men during the course of the conflicts.

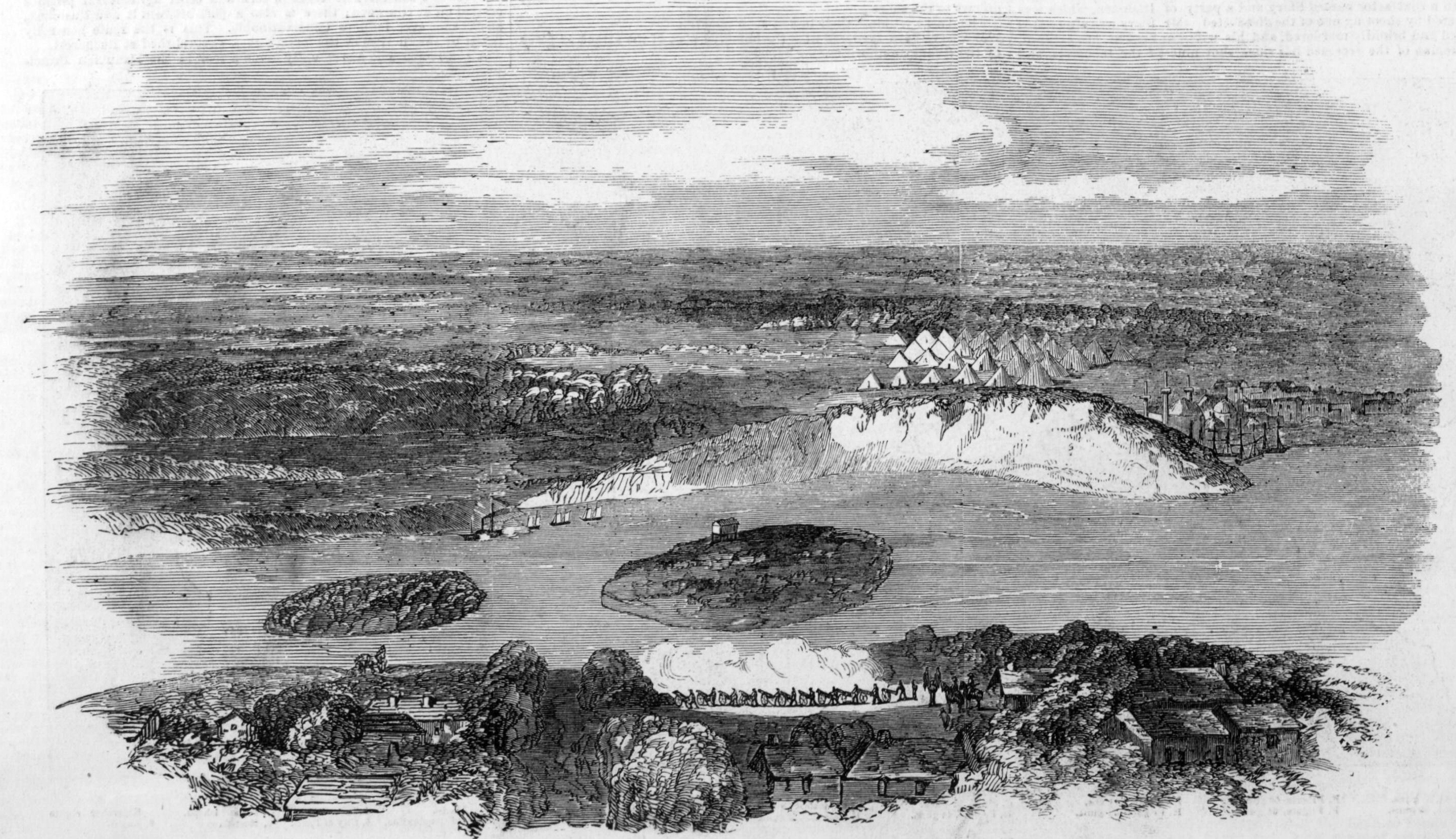
The battle as portrayed in the Illustrated London News

The Turks, on the other hand, were content with occupying Giurgiu and did not pursue the escaping Russian force. Prince Gorchakov, having concentrated in the town of Frătești 46 battalions of infantry, 60 squadrons of cavalry, 4 Cossack regiments and 180 guns, waited for the Turks to arrive so that they could launch a counterattack; however, this was in vain. Gorchakov had to send the 16th Division to Crimea, after which he continued to lead the retreating of Russian troops from the Danube on 27 July.

== Sources ==
- Журжево // Военная энциклопедия : [в 18 т.] / под ред. В. Ф. Новицкого ... [и других: К. И. Величко, А. В. фон-Шварца, В. А. Апушкина, Г. К. фон-Шульца]. — Санкт-Петербург ; [Москва] : Типография т-ва И. Д. Сытина, 1911–1915.
- М. И. Богданович. Восточная война 1853-1856 гг. В 4 т. — СПб.: Тип. Ф. Сущинского, 1876.
- Е. В. Тарле. Крымская война. В 2-х т. — М.-Л.: 1941-1944
- Figes, Orlando (2010). The Crimean War: A History. Metropolitan Books. ISBN 9780805074604. Published in the UK as Crimea: The Last Crusade.
