= Gülbahar =

Gülbahar is a Turkish given name for females and may refer to:

- Gülbahar Gözütok (born 2002), Turkish karateka
- Gülbahar Hatun, consort of Ottoman Sultan Mehmed II, Valide Hatun as the mother of Sultan Bayezid II
- Gülbahar Hatun, consort of Ottoman Sultan Bayezid II and the mother of Sultan Selim I
- Mahidevran Gülbahar Hatun, consort of Ottoman Sultan Suleiman the Magnificent and the mother of Şehzade Mustafa.
