= Season of Love (2024 film) =

2024 Turkish romantic film

- Official promotional poster
- Turkish: Aşk Mevsimi
- Directed by: Murat Şeker
- Screenplay by: Ali Tanrıverdi; Murat Şeker
- Starring: Dilan Çiçek Deniz, Cem Yiğit Üzümoğlu, Duygu Sarışın
- Cinematography: Tufan Kılınç
- Edited by: Cagri Turkkan
- Music by: Serhat Ersöz
- Production company: SugarWorkz
- Distributed by: CJ ENM
- Release date: February 2, 2024
- Running time: 126 minutes
- Country: Turkey
- Language: Turkish
- Box office: ₺2.3 million

Season of Love (Turkish: Aşk Mevsimi) is a 2024 Turkish romance film directed by Murat Şeker and written by Ali Tanrıverdi, and Murat Şeker. Starring Dilan Çiçek Deniz, Cem Yiğit Üzümoğlu, and Duygu Sarışın, the film tells about the contradictory aspects of love and happiness. It was released on 2 February 2024 in Turkey by CJ ENM.

== Synopsis ==
The film shows how young love evolves over the years. Şirin and Ali Yaman’s story starts in Bozcaada when they were children. But as time goes by, their relationship becomes inseparable. Şirin and Ali’s emotions, which are in sync with the season of love at different moments, never coincide. The film explores the conflicting sides of love and happiness.

== Cast ==
- Dilan Çiçek Deniz as Şirin
- Cem Yiğit Üzümoğlu as Ali Yaman
- Duygu Sarışın
- Fırat Tanış as Altan
- Hakan Bilgin
- Ertuğrul Postoğlu
- Lila Gürmen
- Mert Asutay
- Çiçek Dilligil
- Murat Karasu
- Perihan Savaş

== Production ==
Pre-production of the film began in July 2023 with the announcement of the lead cast as Dilan Çiçek Deniz and Cem Yiğit Üzümoğlu. It was revealed that the film directed and co-scripted by Murat Şeker, will begin filming in August in Bozcaada.

Filming began in early August 2023 and completed in Bozcaada in the end of the same month.

== Release ==
Season of Love, initially slated to release on 9 February 2024, was advanced to be released on 2 February 2024.

== Reception ==
=== Box office ===
Season of Love was released on 2 February 2024 in 144 cinemas. It was at the 12th place among all the films released in Turkey in 2024, with gross of ₺1,858,190 in first week of release.

As of May 6, 2024, the film has grossed ₺2,355,198 from 17,025 admissions.

=== Critical response ===
Atilla Dorsay of T24 rated the film 3/5 and praised the performance of Dilan Çiçek Deniz, and Cem Yiğit Üzümoğlu. Giving positive review Dorsay wrote, "Murat Şeker has actually made an original film and the scenario they came up with Ali Tanrıverdi is also solid."
