= Grudge (2021 film) =

- Turkish: Kin
- Directed by: Türkan Derya
- Starring: Yılmaz Erdoğan; Cem Yiğit Üzümoğlu
- Production company: BKM Film
- Distributed by: Netflix
- Release date: 8 October 2021
- Country: Turkey
- Language: Turkish

Grudge (Turkish: Kin) is a 2021 Turkish film directed by Türkan Derya and starring Yılmaz Erdoğan and Cem Yiğit Üzümoğlu.

== Cast ==
- Yılmaz Erdoğan as Harun
- Cem Yiğit Üzümoğlu
- Rüzgar Aksoy
- Ahmet Mümtaz Taylan
- Metehan Parıltı as Aslan
- Yosi Mizrahi
- Elif Gizem Aykul
- Yasin Sofuoglu
