= Cem Yiğit Üzümoğlu =

Turkish actor (born 1994)

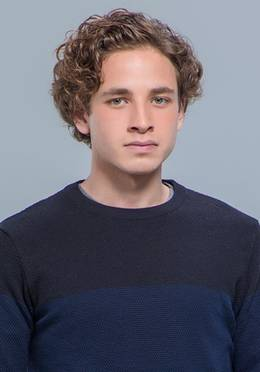
- Born: 1 March 1994 (age 32); Istanbul, Turkey
- Education: Hacettepe University
- Occupation: Actor
- Years active: 2016–present

Cem Yiğit Üzümoğlu (born 1 March 1994) is a Turkish actor. He came to fame by appearing in the youth series Adı Efsane as Hakan.

== Early life ==
Üzümoğlu was born on 1st March 1994 in Istanbul. He is a graduate of Hacettepe University Ankara State Conservatory, Department of Acting.

== Career ==
=== TV Series ===
He made his debut on television with the youth series Adı Efsane as Hakan Şahin.

=== Web series ===
In 2020, Üzümoğlu portrayed Mehmed the Conqueror in the Netflix original docuseries Rise of Empires: Ottoman. He had guest role in "Hakan: Muhafız".

=== Films ===
He played in Yılmaz Erdoğan's crime film "Kin". He won Altın Portakal Film Festival Best Actor Award for his role in LCV (Lütfen Cevap Veriniz). He played in awarded film Karanlık Gece alongside Pınar Deniz.

=== Theatre ===
He had previously appeared in various plays. In April 2017, at the 21st Yapı Kredi Afife Theater Awards he was awarded as the "Most Successful Young Generation Artist of the Year". In 2018, he appeared on the stage again with the plays Troas and Kalp. In 2019, he joined the cast of Evlat, a play directed by İbrahim Çiçek. He later appeared as Prince Hamlet in an adaptation of the famous play published for YouTube's Digital Sahne.

== Activism ==
In 2025, Üzümoğlu was detained for supporting the shopping boycott called during the 2025 Turkish protests against the arrest of Ekrem İmamoğlu.

== Filmography ==
Web series
Year	Title	Role	Notes
2018	Hakan: Muhafız	Emir	Guest
2020–2022	Rise of Empires: Ottoman	Mehmed the Conqueror	Leading role
TV series
Year	Title	Role	Notes
2017	Adı Efsane	Hakan Şahin	Leading role
2024	Aşka Düşman	Uygar Gür	Leading role
2024–2025	Şakir Paşa Ailesi: Mucizeler ve Skandallar	Cevat Şakir Kabaağaçlı	Leading role

Film
Year	Title	Role	Notes
2021	Kin		Leading role
2022	LCV (Lütfen Cevap Veriniz)	Mert	Leading role
2023	Karanlık Gece	Ali	Leading role
2024	Aşk Mevsimi	Ali Yaman	Leading role

== Theatre ==
Theatre
Year	Title	Writer	Director	Role	Notes
2016	Troas	Dimitris Dimitriadis	Alexandra Kazazou	Astyanax
2018	Salto	Tadeusz Konwicki	Alexandra Kazazou
2018	The Normal Heart	Larry Kramer	İbrahim Çiçek	Felix
2019	The Son	Florian Zeller	İbrahim Çiçek	Nicolas
2021	Hamlet	William Shakespeare	İbrahim Çiçek	Prince Hamlet	Dijital Sahne
2022	The Glass Menagerie	Tennessee Williams	İbrahim Çiçek	Tom
