= Suleiman Baltoghlu =

Ottoman admiral

Baltoghlu Suleiman (Turkish: Baltaoğlu Süleyman or Süleyman Baltaoğlu) was an Ottoman admiral in the 15th century, of Bulgarian origin. He led the Ottoman fleet against the Byzantine Empire in 1453 during the final siege of Constantinople, becoming famous for a naval battle in which four Christian ships managed to enter the Golden Horn in spite of his efforts to blockade the city. Sultan Mehmed II was so angered during the defeat that he rode his horse into the sea screaming at Baltoghlu. When the battle ended, Baltoghlu was brought in front of Mehmed, who promptly ordered that he be executed. Only after the pleading of his subordinates, who told of Baltoghlu's great bravery during the battle (in which he had suffered an eye injury), did Mehmed spare his life, but he was stripped of all his possessions and titles, which were then redistributed among other janissaries.

== Popular culture ==
- Baltaoglu Süleyman is portrayed by Erdal Yıldız in the Netflix series Rise of Empires: Ottoman.
- Süleyman Pasha is played by Hüseyin Santur in the Turkish film Fetih 1453. After he fails to enter the Golden Horn during the siege of Constantinople, he is banished by Sultan Mehmed II (Devrim Evin).
- Baltoghlu is a character in the game Legendary Warriors, where his history is changed so that he isn't removed from his duties after his disgrace at Constantinople, but rather continues to serve as an Ottoman general until he is killed by Vlad the Impaler.
- In Mehmed: Sultan of Conquests, Suleyman is portrayed by Korel Cezayirli. In the series, he becomes a Janissary after his disposal and willingly gets killed by Çandarlı Halil Pasha.
