= Hamza Bey =

Ottoman admiral (d. 1460)

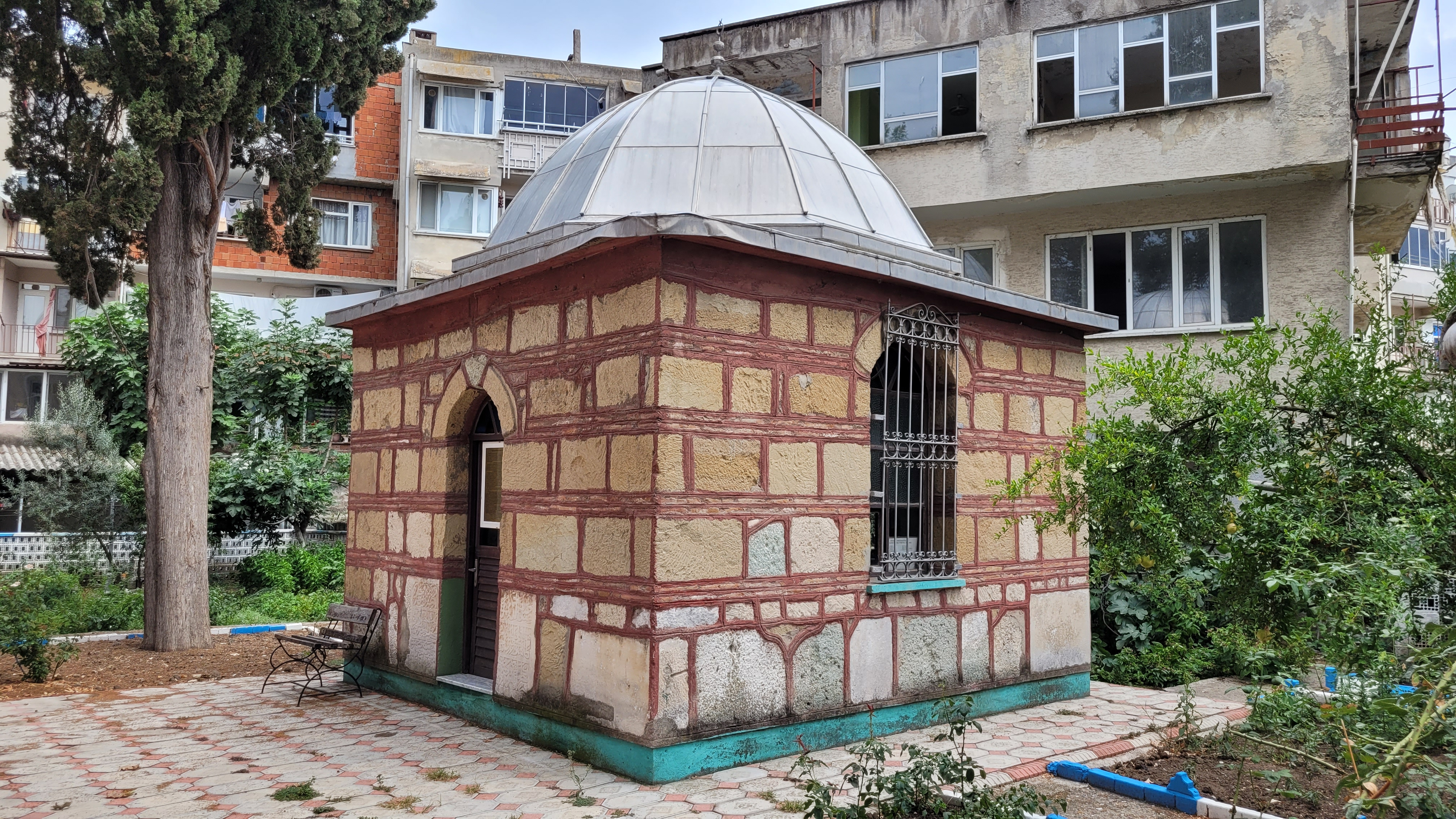
- Tomb of Hamza Bey in Mustafakemalpaşa

Ottoman Kapudan Pasha
- In office April 1453 – January 1456
- Monarch: Sultan Mehmed II
- Preceded by: Suleiman Baltoghlu
- Succeeded by: Has Yunus Bey

Personal details
- Died: 1460 Wallachia

Hamza Bey (died 1460) was a 15th-century Ottoman admiral and envoy of Sultan Mehmed II.

== Biography ==
Hamza Bey first appeared in 1421, when his brother, Bayezid Pasha, tried unsuccessfully to stop Mustafa Çelebi from taking Edirne. Bayezid was of Albanian origin and a war captive. The 15th-century Byzantine historian Doukas described Bayezid as a slave of Albanian origin. Modern historian Uzunçarşılı, without citing a source, wrote that he was born in Amasya as the son of Amasyalı Yahşi Bey, earning him the epithet Amasyalı, meaning "from Amasya," which implied he wasn't a convert or at least not a recent one. This means their grandfather was an Albanian convert to Islam and joined the Ottoman conquest, settling in Amasya. Their troops defected to Mustafa, and Bayezid was executed; Hamza was spared because Junayd of Aydın took pity on his youth. Hamza avenged his brother when he was appointed Beylerbey of Anatolia in 1424: he defeated Junayd, occupied his domains, seized Junayd and his family, and had them executed.

Hamza Bey came to prominence, as a commander in Murad II's fleet, during the siege of Thessalonica, which in 1430 was ultimately successful.

In 1453 Hamza Bey was made commander of the Ottoman fleet during the Conquest of Constantinople; replacing Suleiman Baltoghlu, when Baltoghlu failed to stop the escape of three Genoese galleys and a Byzantine ship through the Ottoman blockade of the city. In the final assault on the city, in order to prevent defenders from the reinforcing the critical northern and western parts of the wall, Hamza and the Ottoman fleet was to provide diversionary attacks against the sea walls of Constantinople in the south, on the Sea of Marmara; and against the dam across Golden Horn in the east. On the day of the assault, May 29, Hamza's forces were unable to force the Byzantine defences, with those troops which managed to gain a foothold being easily repulsed. However, overall the Ottoman assault was successful.

Hamza Bey was to remain Commander of the Ottoman fleet until 1456. After the capture of Constantinople, the Ottoman fleet was tasked with the conquest of the islands of the Aegean; and Imbros, Lemnos and Thasos fell to the Ottomans. However, stalled by the Knights of Rhodes, Hamza was unable to take the remainder of the Aegean, leaving Christian forces astride the Ottoman route from their new capital to the Mediterranean proper.

== Death ==
In 1460, as Bey of Nicopolis, Hamza was at the head of an army, tasked to protect an embassy to the Wallachians. En route back, he and his army were ambushed by Vlad the Impaler. Together with his men, Hamza was impaled by Vlad, being given the honour of having the highest stake in deference to his rank. According to Laonikos Chalkokondyles, upon hearing this, Mehmed lost his temper and became angered, so much so that he struck Mahmud Pasha, who brought the news.

== Monuments ==
Hamza's body was recovered by his sons, and was buried in a complex that he had built in Bursa. The complex, which still exists today, consists of a mosque and a number of tombs, including that of Hamza and his family.

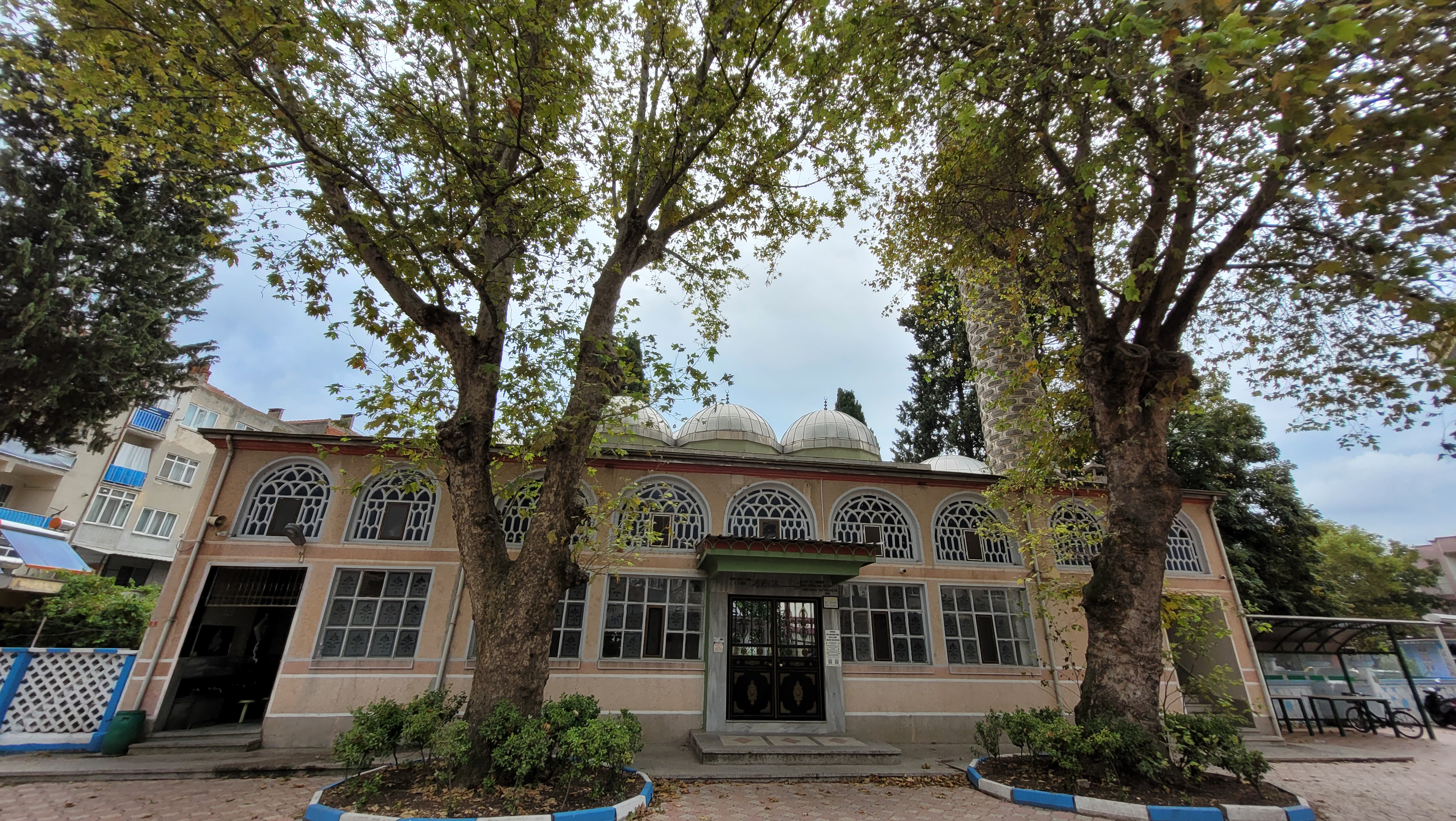
Hamzabey Mosque in Mustafakemalpaşa, which has a tomb in its garden

For his part in the taking of Thessalonica in 1430, the Hamza Bey Mosque, was built there in his name. Following the 1923 population exchange between Greece and Turkey, the mosque fell out of use as a place of worship. After being used for various commercial undertakings, most notably as a cinema, the mosque was bought by the Greek state in 2006 for restoration.

== Personality ==
Bertrandon de la Broquiere, mentions Hamza as a "very valiant" man. According to him, Hamza's income was around 50 thousand ducats.

== In popular culture ==
In the movie Dracula Untold by Gary Shore, Hamza Bey was portrayed by Ferdinand Kingsley.
