= Gedik Ahmed Pasha =

Grand Vizier of the Ottoman Empire from 1474 to 1477

- کدك احمد پاشا

Grand Vizier of the Ottoman Empire
- In office 1474–1477
- Monarch: Mehmed II
- Preceded by: Mahmud Pasha Angelović
- Succeeded by: Karamanlı Mehmed Pasha

Grand Admiral of the Ottoman Fleet Sanjakbeyi of Avlonya
- In office 1478 – c. 1481
- Monarch: Mehmed II
- Succeeded by: Mesih Pasha

Beylerbeyi of Anatolia
- In office c. 1462–1470
- Monarch: Mehmed II
- Preceded by: Ishak Pasha
- Succeeded by: Koca Davud Pasha

Beylerbeyi of Rum
- In office c. 1451–1462 – c. 1451–1462
- Monarch: Mehmed II

Personal details
- Born: Punoševce (Serbian Despotate)
- Died: 18 November 1482 Edirne Palace, Edirne, Ottoman Empire
- Cause of death: Strangling
- Education: Enderun School

Military service
- Allegiance: Ottoman Empire
- Branch/service: Ottoman Army (c. 1450s–1477 and 1481–1482); Ottoman Navy (1478–1481)
- Battles/wars: Battle of Koyulhisar (1461); Battle of Otlukbeli; Battle of Kıreli; Battle of Valea Albă; Ottoman invasion of Otranto; Crimean Campaign (1475) • Siege of Theodoro (1475); Siege of Negroponte (1470)

Gedik Ahmed Pasha (Serbian: Гедик Ахмед-паша; died 18 November 1482) was an Ottoman statesman and admiral who served as grand vizier and kapudan pasha (Grand Admiral of the Ottoman Navy) during the reigns of sultans Mehmed II and Bayezid II.

Very little was known about Gedik Ahmed Pasha in primary sources until late in historiography. Serbia and Albania had both been proposed as geographical regions for his birthplace and Mükrimin Halil Yinanç had even claimed that he was descended from the Byzantine Greek Palaiologos dynasty based on unnamed Western sources Yinanç claimed to have access to. Later research in the Ottoman archives of Vranje (southeastern Serbia) by Aleksandar Stojanovski established that Gedik Ahmed Pasha was a member of the local Serbian feudal families of the area and was born in the village Punoševce.

Leading the Ottoman Army, he defeated the last Anatolian beylik (principality) resisting Ottoman expansion in the region, the Karamanids. The Karamanids had been the strongest principality in Anatolia for nearly 200 years, even stronger than the Ottomans in the latter's beginning. They effectively succeeded the Sultanate of Rûm in the amount of possessions they held, among them the city of Konya, the former Selçuk capital.

Gedik Ahmed Pasha also fought against Venetians in the Mediterranean and was dispatched in 1475 by the Sultan to aid the Crimean Khanate against Genoese forces. In Crimea, he conquered Caffa, Soldaia, Cembalo and other Genoese castles as well as the Principality of Theodoro with its capital Mangup and the coastal regions of Crimea. He rescued the Khan of Crimea, Meñli I Giray, from Genoese forces. As a result of this campaign, Crimea and Circassia entered into the Ottoman sphere of influence.

In 1479, when he was a sanjakbey of the Sanjak of Avlona, Sultan Mehmet II ordered him to lead a force of between 10,000 and 40,000 troops for the siege of Shkodra. Later that year, the sultan ordered him to lead the Ottoman Navy in the Mediterranean Sea as part of the war against Naples and Milan. During his campaign, Gedik Ahmed Pasha conquered the islands of Santa Maura (Lefkada), Kefalonia, and Zante (Zakynthos). Since he had conquered Constantinople in 1453, Mehmed II saw himself as the inheritor of the Roman Empire and seriously considered the conquest of Italy to reunite Roman lands under his dynasty. As part of this plan, Gedik Ahmed Pasha was sent with a naval force to the heel of the Italian peninsula.

After a failed attempt to conquer Rhodes from the Knights of St. John, Ahmed successfully took the Italian harbor city of Otranto in 1480. However, due to lack of food and supplies, he had to return with most of his troops to Albania in the same year, planning to continue the campaign in 1481.

The death of Mehmed II prevented this. Instead, Ahmet sided with Bayezid II in the struggle for who would succeed the sultan. However, Bayezid II did not fully trust Ahmed and had him imprisoned and later killed on 18 November 1482.

== See also ==
- Ottoman invasion of Otranto
- Ottoman Navy
- List of Ottoman grand viziers
- List of Kapudan Pashas

Political offices
| Preceded by Mahmud Pasha Angelovic | Grand Vizier of the Ottoman Empire; 1474–1477 | Succeeded by Karamanlı Mehmed Pasha |
