= Mehmed II =

Sultan of the Ottoman Empire (r. 1444–1446, 1451–1481)

- Caesar of Rome; The Sultan of two lands and the Khan of two seas
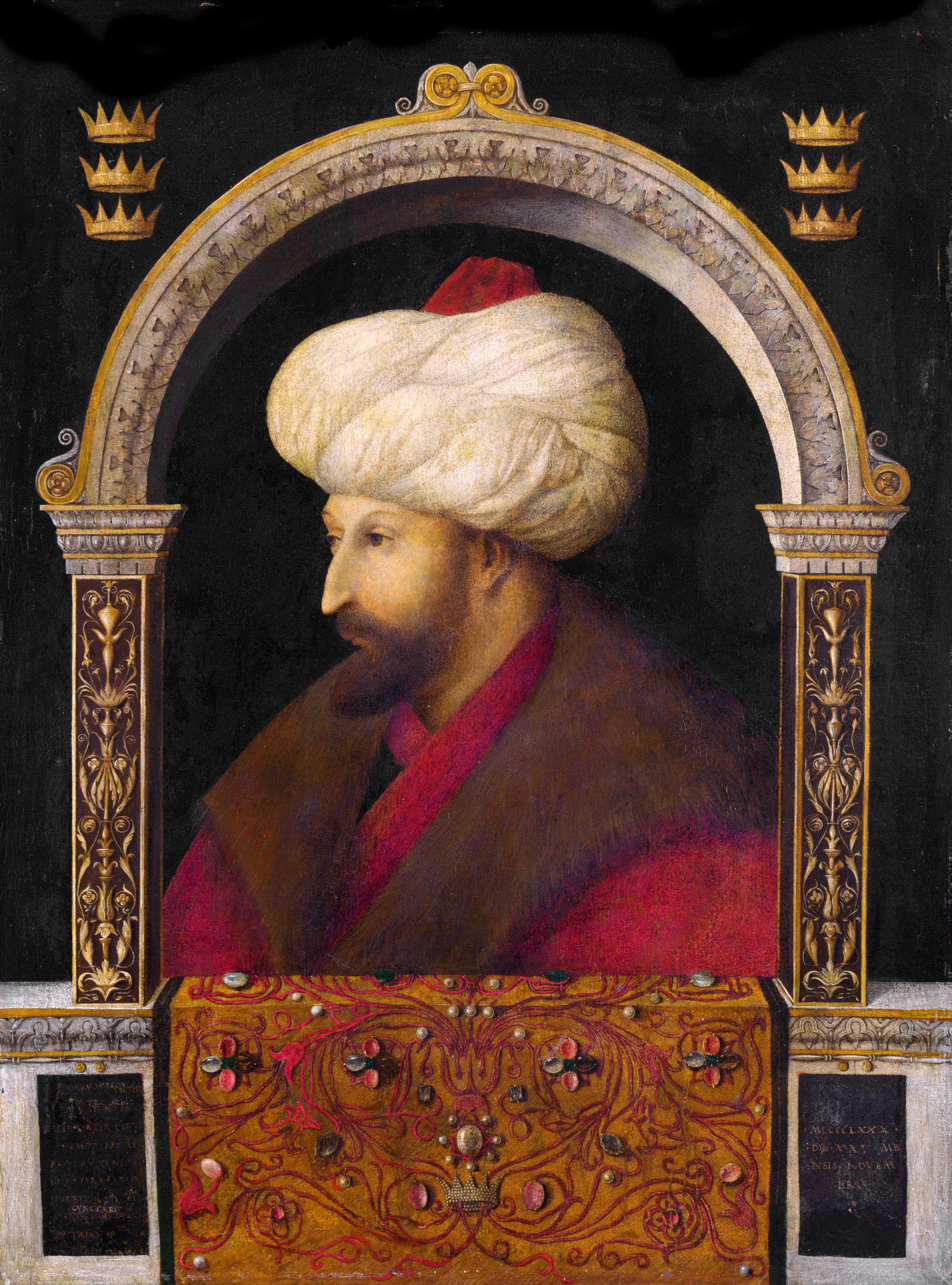
- Portrait of Mehmet II by Gentile Bellini, dating 1480

Sultan of the Ottoman Empire (Padishah)
- 1st reign: August 1444 – September 1446
- Predecessor: Murad II
- Successor: Murad II
- 2nd reign: 3 February 1451 – 3 May 1481
- Predecessor: Murad II
- Successor: Bayezid II
- Born: 30 March 1432; Edirne, Ottoman Sultanate
- Died: 3 May 1481 (aged 49); Hünkârçayırı (Tekfurçayırı), near Gebze, Ottoman Empire
- Burial: Fatih Mosque, Istanbul, Turkey
- Consorts: Sittişah Mükrime Hatun; Gülbahar Hatun; Gülşah Hatun; Çiçek Hatun; Others
- Issue Among others: Gevherhan Hatun; Bayezid II; Şehzade Mustafa; Şehzade Cem
Names
- Meḥemmed bin Murād Ḫan
- Dynasty: Ottoman
- Father: Murad II
- Mother: Hüma Hatun
- Religion: Sunni Islam
- Tughra
- Military career
- Allegiance: Ottoman Empire
- Branch: Ottoman Army
- Service years: 1444–1481
- Rank: Sultan / Commander-in-Chief
- Conflicts: During his time as a prince; Siege of Svetigrad; Battle of Kosovo (1448); Siege of Krujë (1450); Byzantine-Ottoman Wars; Fall of Constantinople; Battle of Corinth (1458); Siege of Kastritza; Siege of Gardiki-Arcadia; Siege of Salmeniko; Siege of Trebizond (1461); Ottoman wars in Europe; Battle of Ostrvica; Battle of Tripolje (1454); Siege of Novo Brdo (1455); Siege of Trepča; Aegan Expedition (1456); Siege of Belgrade (1456); Battle of Užice; Siege of Smederevo (1459); Battle of Turnu; Battle of Târgovişte; Battle of Buzău; Siege of Lesbos; Battle of Ključ (1463); Ottoman-Venetian War (1463-1479); Siege of Jajce (1464); Albanian Campaign (1466); Mehmed II's 1467 Albanian campaign; Battle of Buzurshek; Siege of Negroponte (1470); Battle of Valea Alba; Siege of Neamț Citadel; Serbia Expedition (1477); Siege of Krujë (1477-1478); Siege of Shkodra; Ottoman wars in Asia; Siege of Amasra; Siege of Sinop (1461); Battle of Koyulhisar (1461); Battle of Larende; Battle of Eflatun Pınar; Battle of Erzincan (1473); Battle of Otlukbeli; Siege of Şebinkarahisar

Mehmed II (Note: Ottoman Turkish: محمد ثانى, romanized: Meḥemmed-i s̱ānī; Turkish: II. Mehmed, pronounced [icinˈdʒi ˈmehmet]) (30 March 1432 – 3 May 1481), commonly known as Mehmed the Conqueror, (Note: Ottoman Turkish: ابو الفتح, romanized: Ebū'l-fetḥ, lit. 'the Father of Conquest'; Turkish: Fâtih Sultan Mehmed) was the sultan of the Ottoman Empire twice, from August 1444 to September 1446 and again from February 1451 to May 1481.

During his first reign, he defeated the crusade led by John Hunyadi after Hungarian incursions into his lands violated the Treaties of Edirne and Szeged. Upon his restoration to the throne in 1451, he strengthened the Ottoman Navy and made preparations to attack Constantinople. In 1453, at the age of 21, he conquered Constantinople and effectively brought an end to the Byzantine Empire. After the conquest, Mehmed claimed the title caesar of Rome, (Note: Ottoman Turkish: قیصر روم, romanized: qayṣar-i rūm) on the grounds that Constantinople had been the seat and capital of the surviving Eastern Roman Empire since its consecration in 330 AD by Emperor Constantine I. The claim was soon recognized by the Patriarchate of Constantinople, but rejected by most European monarchs.

Mehmed continued his conquests and reunified Anatolia, and campaigned as far west as Bosnia in Southeast Europe. At home, he implemented many political and social reforms. He was a patron of the arts and sciences, and by the end of his reign, Constantinople had been transformed into a thriving imperial capital. He is considered a hero in modern-day Turkey and parts of the wider Muslim world, with Istanbul's Fatih district, Fatih Sultan Mehmet Bridge and Fatih Mosque being named after him.

== Early life and first reign ==
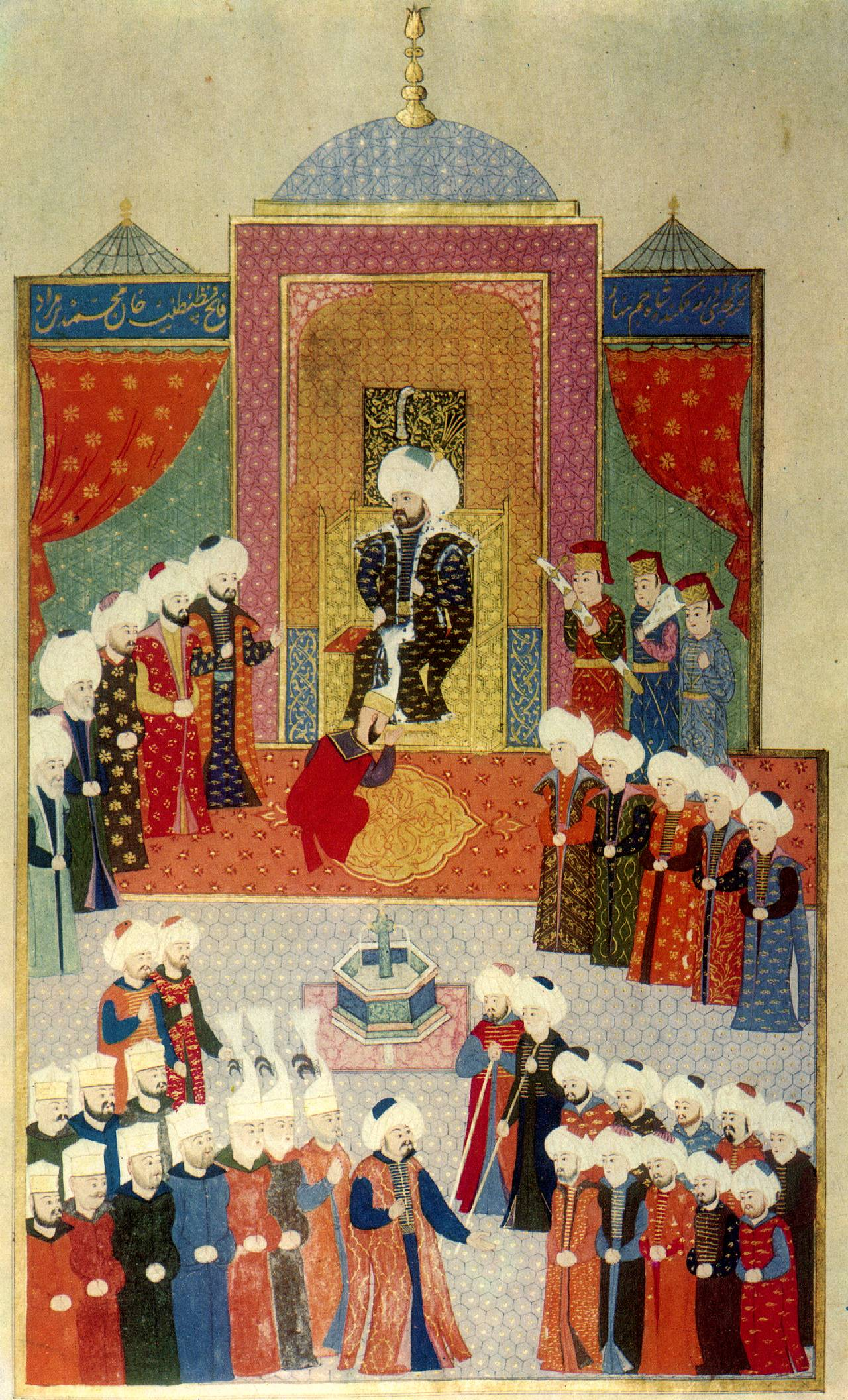
Accession of Mehmed II in Edirne, 1451

Mehmed II was born on 30 March 1432, in Edirne, then the capital city of the Ottoman Empire. His father was Sultan Murad II (1404–1451) and his mother Hüma Hatun, a slave of uncertain origin.

When Mehmed II was eleven years old, he was sent to Amasya with his two lalas (advisors) to govern and thus gain experience, per the custom of Ottoman rulers before his time. Sultan Murad II also sent a number of teachers for him to study under. This Islamic education had a great impact in molding Mehmed's mindset and reinforcing his Muslim beliefs. He was influenced in his practice of Islamic epistemology by practitioners of science, particularly by his mentor, Molla Gürâni, and he followed their approach. The influence of Akshamsaddin in Mehmed's life became predominant from a young age, especially in the imperative of fulfilling his Islamic duty to overthrow the Byzantine Empire by conquering Constantinople.

After Murad II made peace with Hungary on 12 June 1444, he abdicated the throne in favour of his 12-year-old son Mehmed II in July/August 1444.

During Mehmed II's first reign, he defeated the crusade led by John Hunyadi after the Hungarian incursions into his country broke the conditions of the truce per the Treaties of Edirne and Szeged in September 1444. Cardinal Julian Cesarini, the representative of the Pope, had convinced the king of Hungary that breaking the truce with Muslims was not a betrayal. At this time, Mehmed II asked his father Murad II to reclaim the throne, but Murad II refused. According to the 17th-century chronicles, Mehmed II wrote, "If you are the sultan, come and lead your armies. If I am the sultan, I hereby order you to come and lead my armies." Then, Murad II led the Ottoman army and won the Battle of Varna on 10 November 1444. Halil Inalcik states that Mehmed II did not ask for his father. Instead, it was Çandarlı Halil Pasha's effort to bring Murad II back to the throne.

In 1446, while Murad II returned to the throne, Mehmed retained the title of sultan but only acted as a governor of Manisa. Following the death of Murad II in 1451, Mehmed II became sultan for the second time. Ibrahim II of Karaman invaded the disputed area and instigated various revolts against Ottoman rule. Mehmed II conducted his first campaign against İbrahim of Karaman; the Byzantines threatened to release Ottoman claimant Orhan.

== Conquests ==
=== Conquest of Constantinople ===
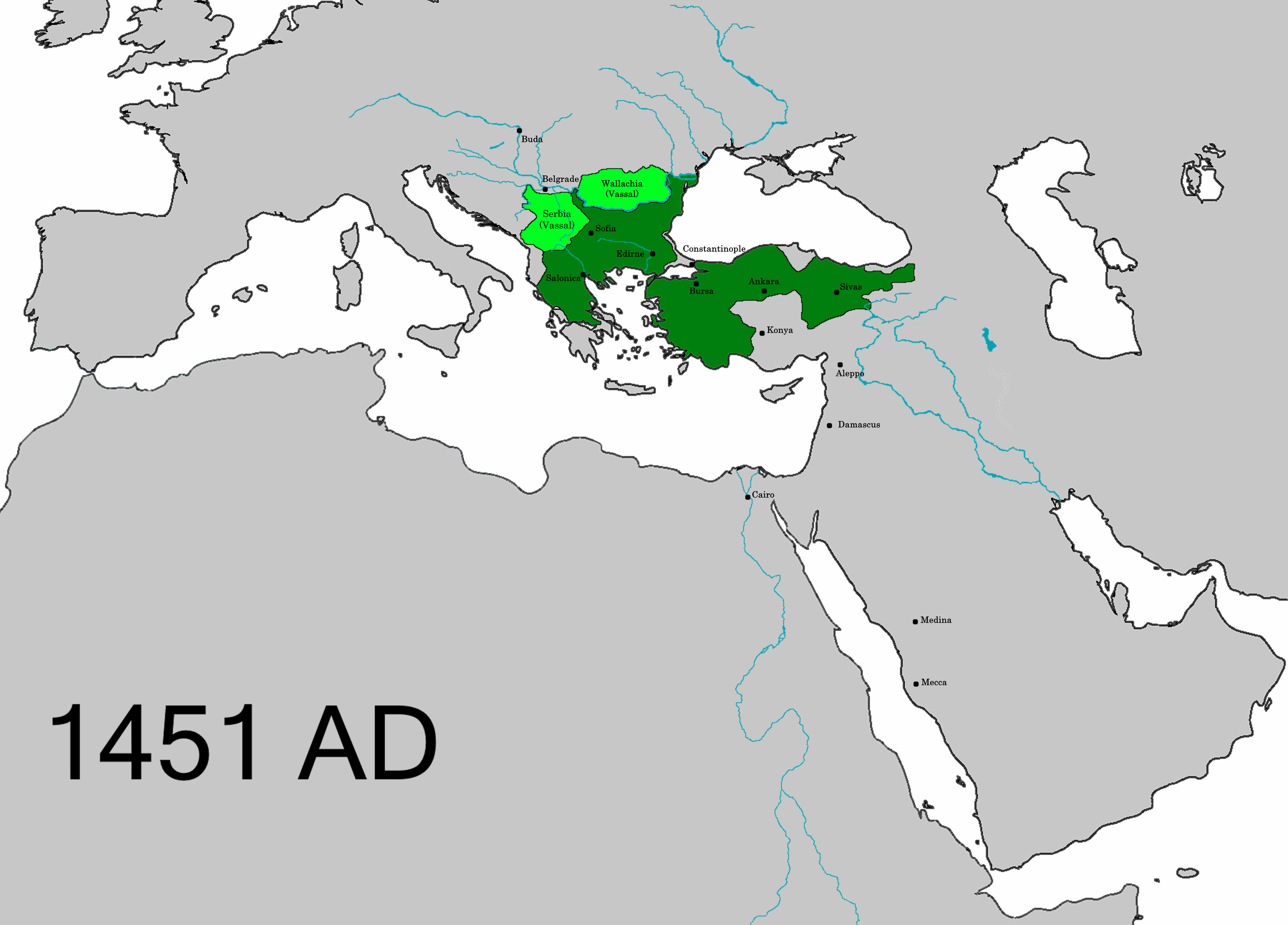
The Ottoman Empire at the beginning of Mehmed II's second reign

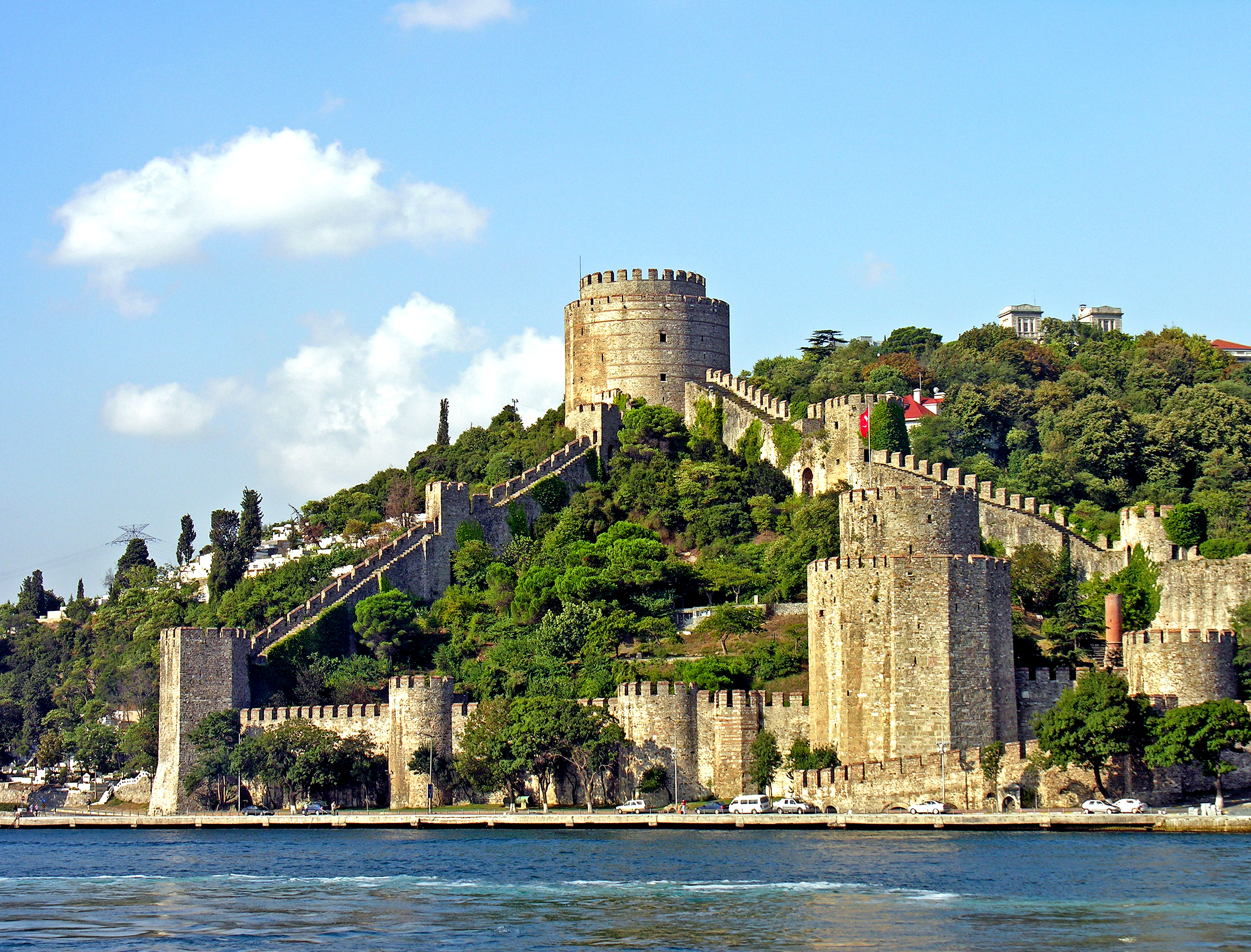
Rumelihisarı, built by Sultan Mehmed II between 1451 and 1452, before the Fall of Constantinople

When Mehmed II ascended the throne again in 1451, he devoted himself to strengthening the Ottoman navy and made preparations for an attack on Constantinople. In the narrow Bosphorus Straits, the fortress Anadoluhisarı had been built by his great-grandfather Bayezid I on the Asian side; Mehmed erected an even stronger fortress called Rumelihisarı on the European side, and thus gained complete control of the strait. Having completed his fortresses, Mehmed proceeded to levy a toll on ships passing within reach of their cannon. A Venetian vessel ignoring signals to stop was sunk with a single shot and all the surviving sailors beheaded, except for the captain, who was impaled and mounted like a human scarecrow as a warning to other sailors on the strait.

Abu Ayyub al-Ansari, the companion and standard bearer of the Islamic prophet Muhammad, had died during the first Siege of Constantinople (674–678). As Mehmed II's army approached Constantinople, Mehmed's sheikh Akshamsaddin discovered the tomb of Abu Ayyub al-Ansari. After the conquest, Mehmed built Eyüp Sultan Mosque at the site to emphasize the importance of the conquest to the Islamic world and highlight his role as ghazi.

In 1453, Mehmed commenced the siege of Constantinople with an army between 80,000 and 200,000 troops, an artillery train of over seventy large field pieces, and a navy of 320 vessels, the bulk of them transports and storeships. The city was surrounded by sea and land; the fleet at the entrance of the Bosphorus stretched from shore to shore in the form of a crescent, to intercept or repel any assistance for Constantinople from the sea. In early April, the Siege of Constantinople began. At first, the city's walls held off the Turks, even though Mehmed's army used the new bombard designed by Orban, a giant cannon similar to the Dardanelles Gun. The harbor of the Golden Horn was blocked by a boom chain and defended by twenty-eight warships.

On 22 April, Mehmed transported his lighter warships overland, around the Genoese colony of Galata, and into the Golden Horn's northern shore; eighty galleys were transported from the Bosphorus after paving a route, little over one mile, with wood. Thus, the Byzantines stretched their troops over a longer portion of the walls. About a month later, Constantinople fell, on 29 May, following a fifty-seven-day siege. After this conquest, Mehmed moved the Ottoman capital from Adrianople to Constantinople.

When Sultan Mehmed II stepped into the ruins of the Boukoleon, known to the Ottomans and Persians as the Palace of the Caesars, probably built over a thousand years before by Theodosius II, he uttered the famous lines of Saadi:

The spider is curtain-bearer in the palace of Chosroes,
The owl sounds the relief in the castle of Afrasiyab.

Some Muslim scholars claimed that a hadith in Musnad Ahmad referred specifically to Mehmed's conquest of Constantinople, seeing it as the fulfillment of a prophecy and a sign of the approaching apocalypse.

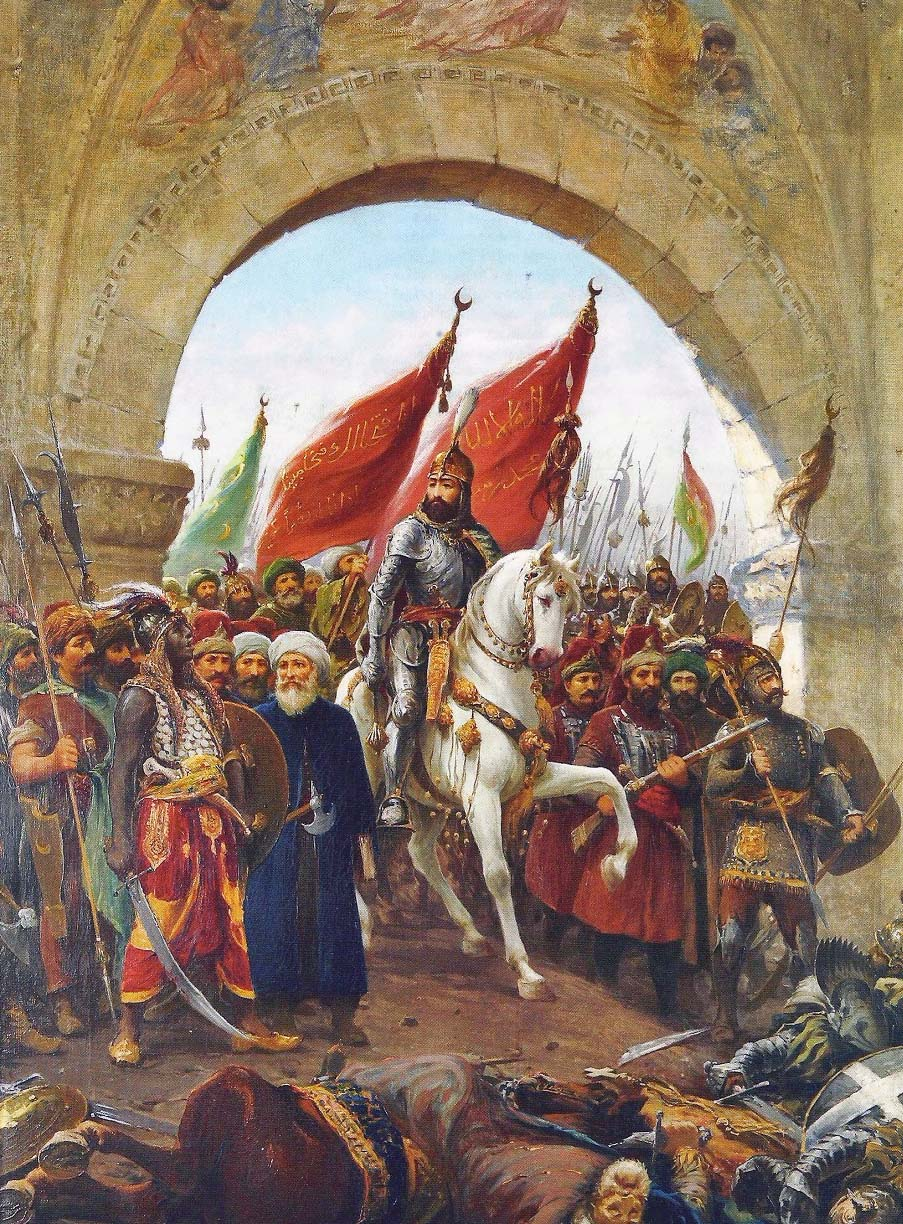
The entry of Sultan Mehmed II into Constantinople, painting by Fausto Zonaro (1854–1929)

After the conquest of Constantinople, Mehmed claimed the title of caesar of the Roman Empire (Qayser-i Rûm), based on the assertion that Constantinople had been the seat and capital of the Roman Empire since 330 AD and whoever possessed the Imperial capital was the ruler of the empire. The contemporary scholar George of Trebizond supported his claim. The claim was not recognized by the Catholic Church and most of, if not all, Western Europe, but was recognized by the Eastern Orthodox Church. Mehmed had installed Gennadius Scholarius, a staunch antagonist of the West, as the ecumenical patriarch of Constantinople with all the ceremonial elements, ethnarch (or milletbashi) status, and rights of property that made him the second largest landlord in the empire after the sultan himself in 1454, and in turn, Gennadius II recognized Mehmed the Conqueror as the successor to the throne.

Emperor Constantine XI Palaiologos died without producing an heir, and had Constantinople not fallen to the Ottomans, he likely would have been succeeded by the sons of his deceased elder brother. Those children were taken into the palace service of Mehmed after the fall of Constantinople. The oldest boy, renamed Hass Murad, became a personal favorite of Mehmed and served as beylerbey of the Balkans. The younger son, renamed Mesih Pasha, became admiral of the Ottoman fleet and sanjak-bey of the Gallipoli. He eventually served twice as Grand Vizier under Mehmed's son, Bayezid II.

After the fall of Constantinople, Mehmed would also go on to conquer the Despotate of Morea in the Peloponnese in two campaigns in 1458 and 1460 and the Empire of Trebizond in northeastern Anatolia in 1461. The last two vestiges of Byzantine rule were thus absorbed by the Ottoman Empire. The conquest of Constantinople bestowed immense glory and prestige on the country. Kritovoulos reports that 10 years after the conquest of Constantinople, Mehmed II allegedly visited the site of Troy and boasted that he had avenged the Trojans by conquering the Greeks (Byzantines). This story is considered to be fictitious, as there are no Ottoman sources which mention it and there is no further evidence of any Turkish claiming of Troy. Mehmed also allegedly visited the Acropolis, but this, too, is considered apocryphal. These myths were customary in propaganda writing and encomia; Kritovoulos, in particular, used those two stories because he sought to "Hellenize" Mehmed.

=== Conquest of Serbia (1454–1459) ===
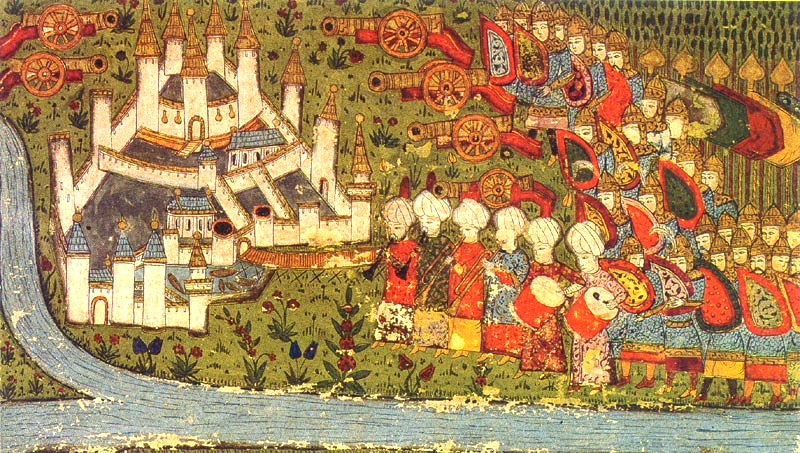
Ottoman miniature of the Siege of Belgrade, 1456

Mehmed II's first campaigns after Constantinople were in the direction of Serbia, which had been an Ottoman vassal state intermittently since the Battle of Kosovo in 1389. The Ottoman ruler had a connection with the Serbian Despotate – one of Murad II's wives was Mara Branković – and he used that fact to claim Serbian lands. Đurađ Branković's recently made alliance with the Hungarians, and his irregular payments of tribute, further served as justifications for the invasion. The Ottomans sent an ultimatum demanding the keys to some Serbian castles which formerly belonged to the Ottomans. When Serbia refused these demands, the Ottoman army led by Mehmed set out from Edirne towards Serbia in 1454, sometime after the 18th of April. Mehmed's forces quickly succeeded in capturing Sivricehisar (sometimes identified with the Ostrvica Fortress) and Omolhisar, and repulsed a Serbian cavalry force of 9,000 cavalry sent against them by the despot. Following these actions, the Serbian capital of Smederevo was put under siege by the Ottoman forces. Before the city could be taken, intelligence was received about an approaching Hungarian relief force led by Hunyadi, which caused Mehmed to lift the siege and start marching back to his domains. By August the campaign was effectively over, Mehmed left a part of his force under the command of Firuz Bey in Serbia in anticipation of a possible offensive on Ottoman territories by Hunyadi. This force was defeated by a combined Hungarian-Serbian army led by Hunyadi and Nikola Skobaljić on the 2nd of October near Kruševac, after which Hunyadi went on to raid Ottoman controlled Nish and Pirot before returning back to Belgrade. Roughly a month later, on the 16th of November, the Ottomans avenged their earlier defeat at Kruševac by defeating Skobaljić's army near Tripolje, where the Serbian voivode was captured and executed via impalement. Following this a temporary treaty was signed with the Serbian despot, where Đurađ would formally recognize the recently captured Serbian forts as Ottoman land, send thirty thousand florins to the Porte as yearly tribute and provide troops for Ottoman campaigns. The 1454 campaign had resulted in the capture of fifty thousand prisoners from Serbia, four thousand of whom were settled in various villages near Constantinople. The following year, Mehmed received reports from one of his frontier commanders about Serbian weakness against a possible invasion, the reports in combination with the dissatisfactory results of the 1454 campaign convinced Mehmed to initiate another campaign against Serbia. The Ottoman army marched on the important mining town of Novo Brdo, which Mehmed put under siege. The Serbians could not resist the Ottoman army out in the open, thus resorted to fortifying their various settlements and having their peasants flee to either various fortresses or forests. After forty days of siege and intense cannon fire, Novo Brdo surrendered. Following the conquest of the city, Mehmed captured various other Serbian settlements in the surrounding area, after which he started his march back towards Edirne, visiting his ancestor Murad I's grave in Kosovo on the way.

In 1456, Mehmed decided to continue his momentum towards the northwest and capture the city of Belgrade, which had been ceded to the Kingdom of Hungary by the Serbian despot Đurađ Branković in 1427. Significant preparations were made by the Sultan for the conquest of the city, including the casting of 22 large cannons alongside many smaller ones and the establishment of a navy which would sail up the Danube to aid the army during the siege. The exact number of troops Mehmed commanded varies between sources, but the rumours of its size were significant enough to cause panic in Italy. Ottoman troops began arriving at Belgrade on the 13th of June. After the necessary preparations were finished, Ottoman cannons started bombarding the city walls and Ottoman troops started filling the ditches in front of the walls with earth to advance forward. As despair started to set in amongst the defenders, news started arriving of a relief force assembling across the Danube under the command of John Hunyadi. Upon learning of this development, Mehmed held a war council with his commanders to determine the army's next actions. Karaca Pasha recommended that a part of the army should cross the Danube to counter the approaching relief army. This plan was rejected by the council, particularly due to the opposition by the Rumelian Begs. Instead, the decision was made to prioritize capturing the fortress, a move seen as a tactical blunder by modern historians. This allowed Hunyadi to set up camp with his army across the Danube uncontested. Shortly after, the Ottoman navy was defeated in a five hour long battle by the newly arrived Christian Danubian navy. Following this, Hunyadi's troops started entering the city to reinforce the besieged, which increased the morale of the defending forces. Infuriated by the unfolding events, Mehmed ordered a final attack to capture the city on 21 July, after continuous cannon fire building up to the day of the attack. Ottoman troops were initially successful in breaching the defences and entering the city, however were eventually repulsed by the defenders. The Christians pressed their advantage by launching a counter attack, which started pushing back the Ottoman forces, managing to advance as far as the Ottoman camp. At this crucial point of the battle, one of the viziers advised Mehmed to abandon the camp for his safety, which he refused to do so on the grounds that it would be a "sign of cowardice". After this, Mehmed personally joined the fighting, accompanied by two of his begs. The Sultan managed to personally kill three enemy soldiers before being injured, forcing him to abandon the battlefield. The news of their Sultan fighting alongside them and the arrival of reinforcements caused a morale boost amongst the Ottoman troops, which allowed them to go on the offensive again and push the Christian forces out of the Ottoman camp. The actions of the Sultan had prevented a complete rout of the Ottoman army, however, the army had been far too weakened to attempt to take the city again, causing the Ottoman war council to decide on ending the siege. The Sultan and his army began a retreat to Edirne during the night, without the Christian forces being able to pursue them. Hunyadi died shortly after the siege, meanwhile Đurađ Branković regained possession of some parts of Serbia.

Shortly before the end of the year 1456, roughly 5 months after the Siege of Belgrade, the 79-year-old Branković died. Serbian independence survived after him for only around three years, when the Ottoman Empire formally annexed Serbian lands following dissension among his widow and three remaining sons. Lazar, the youngest, poisoned his mother and exiled his brothers, but he died soon afterwards. In the continuing turmoil the oldest brother Stefan Branković gained the throne. Observing the chaotic situation in Serbia, the Ottoman government decided to definitively conclude the Serbian issue. The Grand Vizier Mahmud Pasha was dispatched with an army to the region in 1458, where he initially conquered Resava and a number of other settlements before moving towards Smederevo. After a battle outside the city walls, the defenders were forced to retreat inside the fortress. In the ensuing siege, the outer walls were breached by Ottoman forces, however the Serbians continued to resist inside the inner walls of the fortress. Not wanting to waste time capturing the inner citadel, Mahmud lifted the siege and diverted his army elsewhere, conquering Rudnik and its environs before attacking and capturing the fortress of Golubac. Subsequently, Mehmed who had returned from his campaign in Morea met up with Mahmud Pasha in Skopje. During this meeting, reports were received that a Hungarian army was assembling near the Danube to launch an offensive against the Ottoman positions in the region. The Hungarians crossed the Danube near Belgrade, after which they marched south towards Užice. While the Hungarian troops were engaged in plunder near Užice, they got ambushed by the Ottoman forces in the region, forcing them to retreat. Despite this victory, for Serbia to be fully annexed into the empire, Smederevo still had to be taken. The opportunity for its capture presented itself the following year. Stefan Branković was ousted from power in March 1459. After that the Serbian throne was offered to Stephen Tomašević, the future king of Bosnia, which infuriated Sultan Mehmed. After Mahmud Pasha suppressed an uprising near Pizren, Mehmed personally led an army against the Serbian capital, capturing Smederevo on the 20th of June 1459. After the surrender of the capital, other Serbian castles which continued to resist were captured in the following months, ending the existence of the Serbian Despotate.

=== Conquest of the Morea (1458–1460) ===
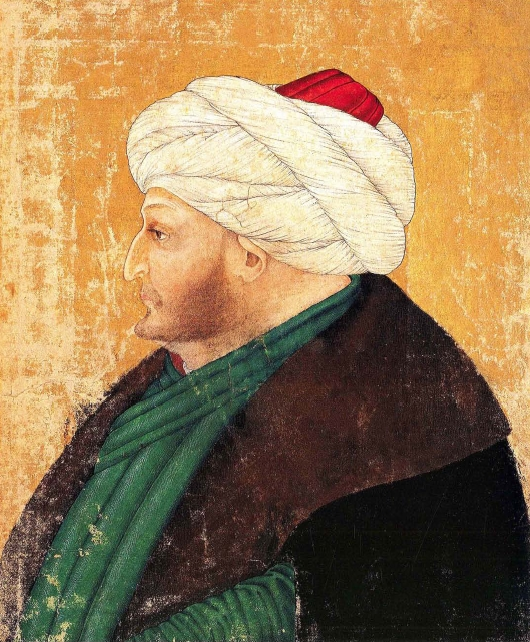
15th century portrait of Mehmed II (1432–1481), showing Italian influence

The Despotate of the Morea bordered the southern Ottoman Balkans. The Ottomans had already invaded the region under Murad II, destroying the Byzantine defenses – the Hexamilion wall – at the Isthmus of Corinth in 1446. Before the final siege of Constantinople, Mehmed ordered Ottoman troops to attack the Morea. The despots, Demetrios Palaiologos and Thomas Palaiologos, brothers of the last emperor, failed to send any aid. The chronic instability and the tribute payment to the Turks, after the peace treaty of 1446 with Mehmed II, resulted in an Albanian-Greek revolt against them, during which the brothers invited Ottoman troops to help put down the revolt. At this time, a number of influential Moreote Greeks and Albanians made private peace with Mehmed. After more years of incompetent rule by the despots, their failure to pay their annual tribute to the Sultan, and finally their own revolt against Ottoman rule, Mehmed entered the Morea in May 1460. The capital Mistra fell exactly seven years after Constantinople, on 29 May 1460. Demetrios ended up a prisoner of the Ottomans and his younger brother Thomas fled. By the end of the summer, the Ottomans had achieved the submission of virtually all cities possessed by the Greeks.

A few holdouts remained for a time. The island of Monemvasia refused to surrender, and it was ruled for a brief time by a Catalan corsair. When the population drove him out they obtained the consent of Thomas to submit to the Pope's protection before the end of 1460. The Mani Peninsula, on the Morea's south end, resisted under a loose coalition of local clans, and the area then came under the rule of Venice. The last holdout was Salmeniko, in the Morea's northwest. Graitzas Palaiologos was the military commander there, stationed at Salmeniko Castle (also known as Castle Orgia). While the town eventually surrendered, Graitzas and his garrison and some town residents held out in the castle until July 1461, when they escaped and reached Venetian territory.

=== Conquest of Trebizond (1460–1461) ===
Emperors of Trebizond formed alliances through royal marriages with various Muslim rulers. Emperor John IV of Trebizond married his daughter to the son of his brother-in-law, Uzun Hasan, sultan of the Aq Qoyunlu (also known as White Sheep Turkomans), in return for his promise to defend Trebizond. He also secured promises of support from the Turkish beys of Sinope and Karamania, and from the king and princes of Georgia. The Ottomans were motivated to capture Trebizond or to get an annual tribute. In the time of Murad II, they first attempted to take the capital by sea in 1442, but bad weather made the landings difficult and the attempt was repulsed. While Mehmed II was away laying siege to Belgrade in 1456, the Ottoman governor of Amasya attacked Trebizond, and although he was defeated, he took many prisoners and extracted a heavy tribute.

After John's death in 1459, his brother David came to power and intrigued with various European powers for help against the Ottomans, speaking of wild schemes that included the conquest of Jerusalem. Mehmed II eventually heard of these intrigues and was further provoked to action by David's demand that Mehmed remit the tribute imposed on his brother.

Mehmed the Conqueror's response came in the summer of 1461. He led a sizable army from Bursa by land and the Ottoman navy by sea, first to Sinope, joining forces with Ismail's brother Ahmed (the Red). He captured Sinope and ended the official reign of the Jandarid dynasty, although he appointed Ahmed as the governor of Kastamonu and Sinope, only to revoke the appointment the same year. Various other members of the Jandarid dynasty were offered important functions throughout the history of the Ottoman Empire. During the march to Trebizond, Uzun Hasan sent his mother Sara Khatun as an ambassador; while they were climbing the steep heights of Zigana on foot, she asked Sultan Mehmed why he was undergoing such hardship for the sake of Trebizond. Mehmed replied:

Mother, in my hand is the sword of Islam, without this hardship I should not deserve the name of ghazi, and today and tomorrow I should have to cover my face in shame before Allah.

Having isolated Trebizond, Mehmed quickly swept down upon it before the inhabitants knew he was coming, and he placed it under siege. The city held out for a month before the emperor David surrendered on 15 August 1461.

=== Submission of Wallachia (1459–1462) ===
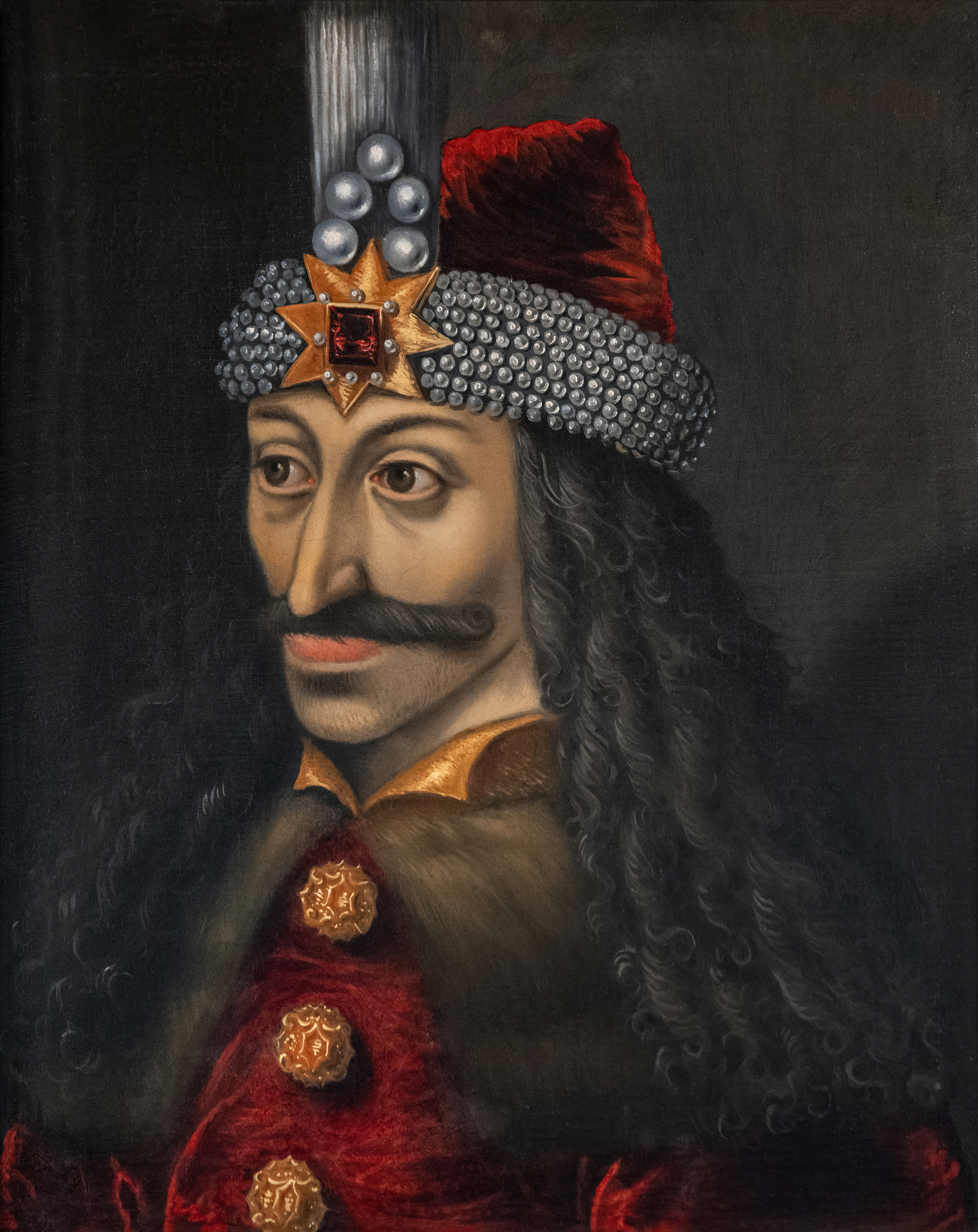
Portrait of Vlad (Dracula) the Impaler, Prince of Wallachia, 1460

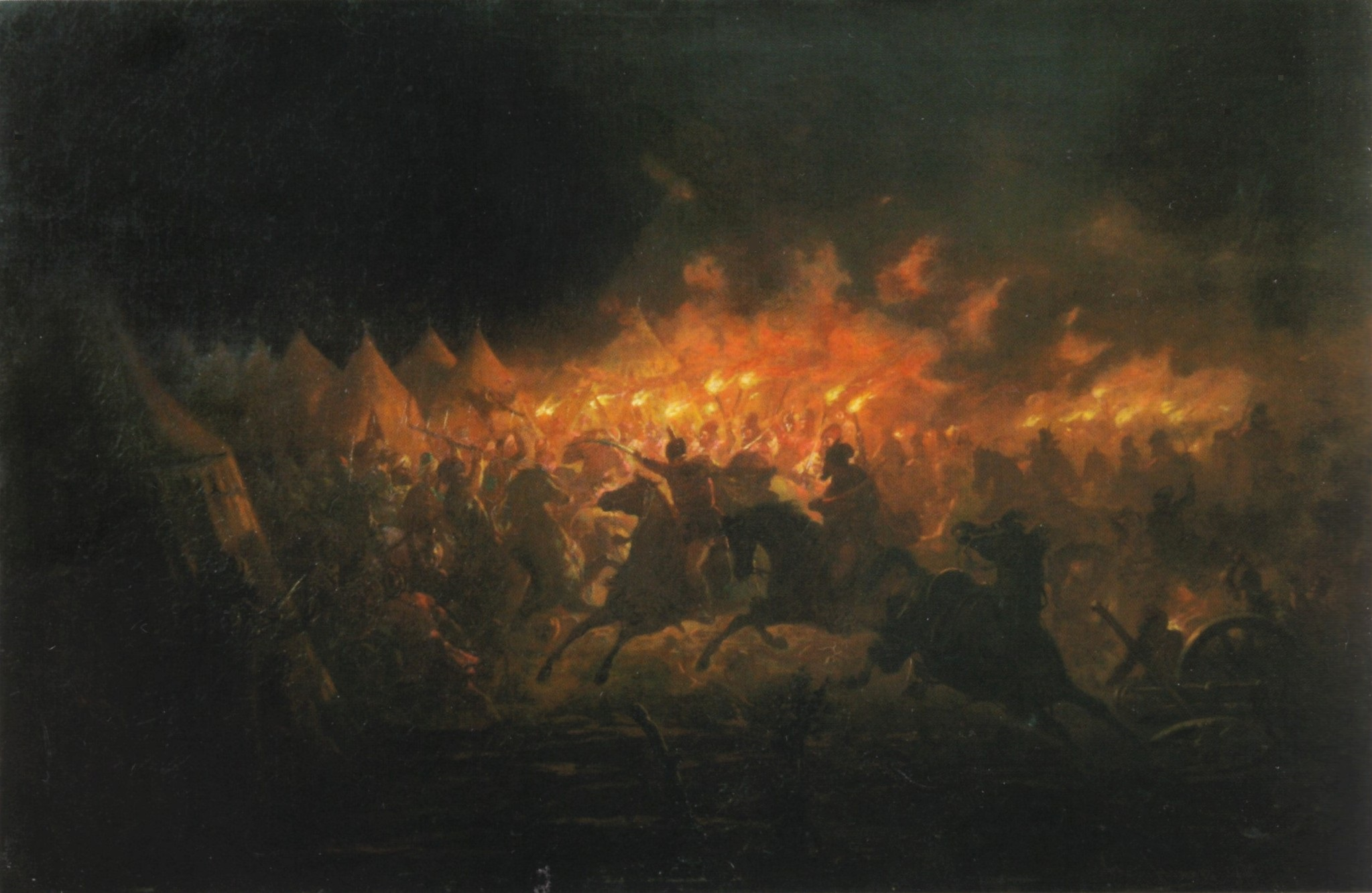
The Night Attack of Târgovişte, which resulted in a failed assassination attempt of Mehmed

The Ottomans, since the early 15th century, had tried to bring Wallachia (Ottoman Turkish: افلاق) under their control by putting their own candidate on the throne, but each attempt ended in failure. The Ottomans regarded Wallachia as a buffer zone between them and the Kingdom of Hungary and, in return for a yearly tribute, did not meddle in their internal affairs. The two primary Balkan powers, Hungary and the Ottomans, persisted in an enduring struggle to gain overlordship over Wallachia. To prevent Wallachia from falling into the Hungarian fold, the Ottomans freed young Vlad III (Dracula), who had spent four years as a prisoner of Murad, together with his brother Radu, so that Vlad could claim the throne of Wallachia. His rule was short-lived, however, as Hunyadi invaded Wallachia and restored his ally Vladislav II, of the Dănești clan, to the throne.

Vlad III Dracula fled to Moldavia, where he lived under the protection of his uncle, Bogdan II. In October 1451, Bogdan was assassinated and Vlad fled to Hungary. Impressed by Vlad's vast knowledge of the mindset and inner workings of the Ottoman Empire, as well as his hatred towards the Turks and the new Sultan, Mehmed II, Hunyadi reconciled with his former enemy and tried to make Vlad III his own advisor, but Vlad refused.

In 1456, three years after the Ottomans had conquered Constantinople, they threatened Hungary by besieging Belgrade. Hunyadi began a concerted counterattack in Serbia: While he himself moved into Serbia and relieved the siege (before dying of the plague), Vlad III Dracula led his own contingent into Wallachia, reconquered his native land, and killed Vladislav II.

In 1459, Mehmed II sent envoys to Vlad to urge him to pay a delayed tribute of 10,000 ducats and 500 recruits into the Ottoman forces. Vlad III Dracula refused and had the Ottoman envoys killed by nailing their turbans to their heads, on the pretext that they had refused to raise their "hats" to him, as they only removed their headgear before Allah.

Meanwhile, the Sultan sent the Bey of Nicopolis, Hamza Pasha, to make peace and, if necessary, eliminate Vlad III. Vlad III set an ambush; the Ottomans were surrounded and almost all of them caught and impaled, with Hamza Pasha impaled on the highest stake, as befit his rank.

In the winter of 1462, Vlad III crossed the Danube and scorched the entire Bulgarian land in the area between Serbia and the Black Sea. Allegedly disguising himself as a Turkish Sipahi and utilizing his command of Turkish language and customs, Vlad III infiltrated Ottoman camps, ambushed, massacred or captured several Ottoman forces.

Mehmed II abandoned his siege of Corinth to launch a punitive attack against Vlad III in Wallachia but suffered many casualties in a surprise night attack led by Vlad III Dracula, who was apparently bent on personally killing the Sultan. However, Vlad's policy of staunch resistance against the Ottomans was not a popular one, and he was betrayed by the boyars's (local aristocracy) appeasing faction, most of them also pro-Dăneşti (a rival princely branch). His ally, Stephen III of Moldavia, who had promised to help him, seized the chance and instead attacked him trying to take back the Fortress of Chilia. Vlad III had to retreat to the mountains. After this, the Ottomans captured the Wallachian capital Târgoviște and Mehmed II withdrew, leaving Radu as ruler of Wallachia. Turahanoğlu Ömer Bey, who served with distinction and wiped out a force of 6,000 Wallachians and deposited 2,000 of their heads at the feet of Mehmed II, was also reinstated, as a reward, in his old gubernatorial post in Thessaly. Vlad eventually escaped to Hungary, where he was imprisoned on a false accusation of treason against his overlord, Matthias Corvinus.

=== Conquest of Bosnia (1463) ===
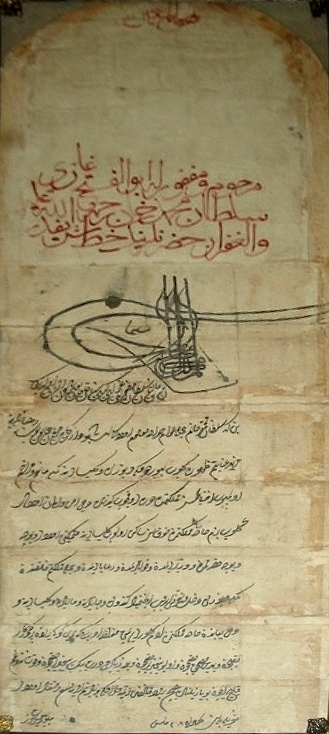
Mehmed II's ahidnâme to the Catholic monks of the recently conquered Bosnia issued in 1463, granting them full religious freedom and protection

The despot of Serbia, Lazar Branković, died in 1458, and a civil war broke out among his heirs that resulted in the Ottoman conquest of Serbia in 1459/1460. Stephen Tomašević, son of the king of Bosnia, tried to bring Serbia under his control, but Ottoman expeditions forced him to give up his plan and Stephen fled to Bosnia, seeking refuge at the court of his father. After some battles, Bosnia became tributary kingdom to the Ottomans.

On 10 July 1461, Stephen Thomas died, and Stephen Tomašević succeeded him as King of Bosnia. In 1461, Stephen Tomašević made an alliance with the Hungarians and asked Pope Pius II for help in the face of an impending Ottoman invasion. In 1463, after a dispute over the tribute paid annually by the Bosnian Kingdom to the Ottomans, he sent for help from the Venetians. However, none ever reached Bosnia. In 1463, Sultan Mehmed II led an army into the country. The royal city of Bobovac soon fell, leaving Stephen Tomašević to retreat to Jajce and later to Ključ. Mehmed invaded Bosnia and conquered it very quickly, executing Stephen Tomašević and his uncle Radivoj. Bosnia officially fell in 1463 and became the westernmost province of the Ottoman Empire.

=== Ottoman-Venetian War (1463–1479) ===
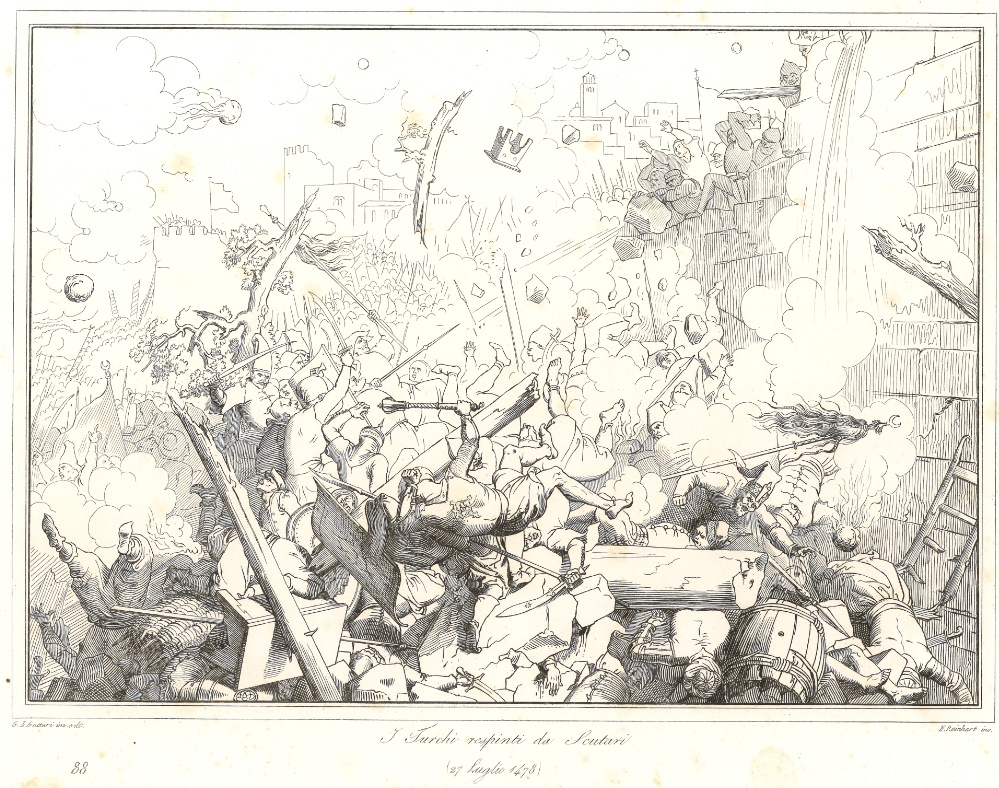
Scene depicts the fifth and greatest assault upon the Shkodra Castle by Ottoman forces in the Siege of Shkodra, 1478–79.

According to the Byzantine historian Michael Critobulus, hostilities broke out after an Albanian slave of the Ottoman commander of Athens fled to the Venetian fortress of Coron (Koroni) with 100,000 silver aspers from his master's treasure. The fugitive then converted to Christianity, so Ottoman demands for his rendition were refused by the Venetian authorities. Using this as a pretext in November 1462, the Ottoman commander in central Greece, Turahanoğlu Ömer Bey, attacked and nearly succeeded in taking the strategically important Venetian fortress of Lepanto (Nafpaktos). On 3 April 1463, however, the governor of the Morea, Isa Beg, took the Venetian-held town of Argos by treason.

The new alliance launched a two-pronged offensive against the Ottomans: a Venetian army, under the Captain General of the Sea Alvise Loredan, landed in the Morea, while Matthias Corvinus invaded Bosnia. At the same time, Pius II began assembling an army at Ancona, hoping to lead it in person. Negotiations were also begun with other rivals of the Ottomans, such as Karamanids, Uzun Hassan and the Crimean Khanate.

In early August, the Venetians retook Argos and refortified the Isthmus of Corinth, restoring the Hexamilion wall and equipping it with many cannons. They then proceeded to besiege the fortress of the Acrocorinth, which controlled the northwestern Peloponnese. The Venetians engaged in repeated clashes with the defenders and with Ömer Bey's forces, until they suffered a major defeat on 20 October and were then forced to lift the siege and retreat to the Hexamilion and to Nauplia (Nafplion). In Bosnia, Matthias Corvinus seized over sixty fortified places and succeeded in taking its capital, Jajce, after a 3-month siege, on 16 December.

Ottoman reaction was swift and decisive: Mehmed II dispatched his Grand Vizier, Mahmud Pasha Angelović, with an army against the Venetians. To confront the Venetian fleet, which had taken station outside the entrance of the Dardanelles Straits, the Sultan further ordered the creation of the new shipyard of Kadirga Limani in the Golden Horn (named after the "kadirga" type of galley), and of two forts to guard the Straits, Kilidulbahr and Sultaniye. The Morean campaign was swiftly victorious for the Ottomans; they razed the Hexamilion, and advanced into the Morea. Argos fell, and several forts and localities that had recognized Venetian authority reverted to their Ottoman allegiance.

Sultan Mehmed II, who was following Mahmud Pasha with another army to reinforce him, had reached Zeitounion (Lamia) before being apprised of his Vizier's success. Immediately, he turned his men north, towards Bosnia. However, the Sultan's attempt to retake Jajce in July and August 1464 failed, with the Ottomans retreating hastily in the face of Corvinus' approaching army. A new Ottoman army under Mahmud Pasha then forced Corvinus to withdraw, but Jajce was not retaken for many years after. However, the death of Pope Pius II on 15 August in Ancona spelled the end of the Crusade.

In the meantime, the Venetian Republic had appointed Sigismondo Malatesta for the upcoming campaign of 1464. He launched attacks against Ottoman forts and engaged in a failed siege of Mistra in August through October. Small-scale warfare continued on both sides, with raids and counter-raids, but a shortage of manpower and money meant that the Venetians remained largely confined to their fortified bases, while Ömer Bey's army roamed the countryside.

In the Aegean, the Venetians tried to take Lesbos in the spring of 1464, and besieged the capital Mytilene for six weeks, until the arrival of an Ottoman fleet under Mahmud Pasha on 18 May forced them to withdraw. Another attempt to capture the island shortly after also failed. The Venetian navy spent the remainder of the year in ultimately fruitless demonstrations of force before the Dardanelles. In early 1465, Mehmed II sent peace feelers to the Venetian Senate; distrusting the Sultan's motives, these were rejected.

In April 1466, the Venetian war effort was reinvigorated under Vettore Cappello: the fleet took the northern Aegean islands of Imbros, Thasos, and Samothrace, and then sailed into the Saronic Gulf. On 12 July, Cappello landed at Piraeus and marched against Athens, the Ottomans' major regional base. He failed to take the Acropolis and was forced to retreat to Patras, the capital of Peloponnese and the seat of the Ottoman bey, which was being besieged by a joint force of Venetians and Greeks. Before Cappello could arrive, and as the city seemed on the verge of falling, Ömer Bey suddenly appeared with 12,000 cavalry and drove the outnumbered besiegers off. Six hundred Venetians and a hundred Greeks were taken prisoner out of a force of 2,000, while Barbarigo himself was killed. Cappello, who arrived some days later, attacked the Ottomans but was heavily defeated. Demoralized, he returned to Negroponte with the remains of his army. There Cappello fell ill and died on 13 March 1467. In 1470 Mehmed personally led an Ottoman army to besiege Negroponte. The Venetian relief navy was defeated, and Negroponte was captured.

In spring 1466, Sultan Mehmed marched with a large army against the Albanians. Under their leader, Skanderbeg, they had long resisted the Ottomans, and had repeatedly sought assistance from Italy. Mehmed II responded by marching again against Albania but was unsuccessful. The winter brought an outbreak of plague, which would recur annually and sap the strength of the local resistance. Skanderbeg himself died of malaria in the Venetian stronghold of Lissus (Lezhë), ending the ability of Venice to use the Albanian lords for its own advantage. After Skanderbeg died, some Venetian-controlled northern Albanian garrisons continued to hold territories coveted by the Ottomans, such as Žabljak Crnojevića, Drisht, Lezhë, and Shkodra – the most significant. Mehmed II sent his armies to take Shkodra in 1474 but failed. Then he went personally to lead the siege of Shkodra of 1478–79. The Venetians and Shkodrans resisted the assaults and continued to hold the fortress until Venice ceded Shkodra to the Ottoman Empire in the Treaty of Constantinople as a condition of ending the war.

The agreement was established as a result of the Ottomans having reached the outskirts of Venice. Based on the terms of the treaty, the Venetians were allowed to keep Ulcinj, Antivan, and Durrës. However, they ceded Shkodra, which had been under Ottoman siege for many months, as well as other territories on the Dalmatian coastline, and they relinquished control of the Greek islands of Negroponte (Euboea) and Lemnos. Moreover, the Venetians were forced to pay 100,000 ducat indemnity and agreed to a tribute of around 10,000 ducats per year in order to acquire trading privileges in the Black Sea. As a result of this treaty, Venice acquired a weakened position in the Levant.

=== Anatolian conquests (1464–1473) ===
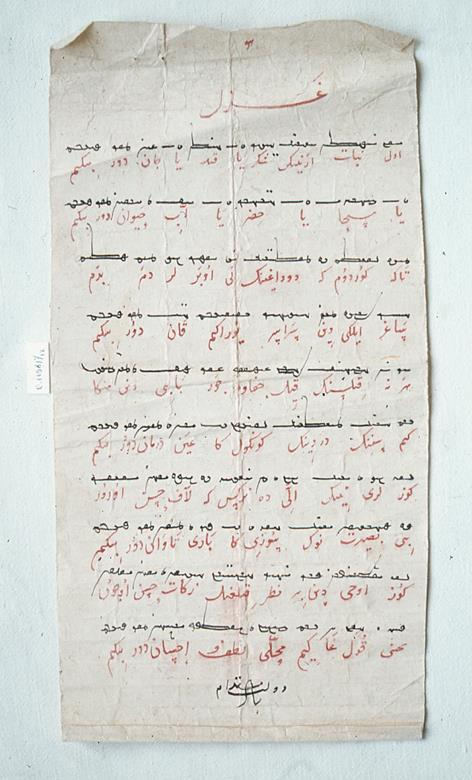
Mehmed's Fetihname (Declaration of conquest) after the Battle of Otlukbeli

During the post-Seljuks era in the second half of the Middle Ages, numerous Turkmen principalities collectively known as Anatolian beyliks emerged in Anatolia. Karamanids initially centred around the modern provinces of Karaman and Konya, the most important power in Anatolia. But towards the end of the 14th century, Ottomans began to dominate on most of Anatolia, reducing the Karaman influence and prestige.

İbrahim II of Karaman was the ruler of Karaman, and during his last years, his sons began struggling for the throne. His heir apparent was İshak of Karaman, the governor of Silifke. But Pir Ahmet, a younger son, declared himself as the bey of Karaman in Konya. İbrahim escaped to a small city in western territories where he died in 1464. The competing claims to the throne resulted in an interregnum in the beylik. Nevertheless, with the help of Uzun Hasan, İshak was able to ascend to the throne. His reign was short, however, as Pir Ahmet appealed to Sultan Mehmed II for help, offering Mehmed some territory that İshak refused to cede. With Ottoman help, Pir Ahmet defeated İshak in the battle of Dağpazarı. İshak had to be content with Silifke up to an unknown date. Pir Ahmet kept his promise and ceded a part of the beylik to the Ottomans, but he was uneasy about the loss. So, during the Ottoman campaign in the West, he recaptured his former territory. Mehmed returned, however, and captured both Karaman (Larende) and Konya in 1466. Pir Ahmet barely escaped to the East. A few years later, Ottoman vizier (later grand vizier) Gedik Ahmet Pasha captured the coastal region of the beylik.

Pir Ahmet as well as his brother Kasım escaped to Uzun Hasan's territory. This gave Uzun Hasan a chance to interfere. In 1472, the Akkoyunlu army invaded and raided most of Anatolia (this was the reason behind the Battle of Otlukbeli in 1473). But then Mehmed led a successful campaign against Uzun Hasan in 1473 that resulted in the decisive victory of the Ottoman Empire in the Battle of Otlukbeli. Before that, Pir Ahmet with Akkoyunlu help had captured Karaman. However, Pir Ahmet could not enjoy another term. Because immediately after the capture of Karaman, the Akkoyunlu army was defeated by the Ottomans near Beyşehir and Pir Ahmet had to escape once more. Although he tried to continue his struggle, he learned that his family members had been transferred to Istanbul by Gedik Ahmet Pasha, so he finally gave up. Demoralized, he escaped to Akkoyunlu territory where he was given a tımar (fief) in Bayburt. He died in 1474.

Uniting the Anatolian beyliks was first accomplished by Sultan Bayezid I, more than fifty years before Mehmed II but after the destructive Battle of Ankara in 1402, the newly formed unification was gone. Mehmed II recovered Ottoman power over the other Turkish states, and these conquests allowed him to push further into Europe.

Another important political entity that shaped the Eastern policy of Mehmed II were the Aq Qoyunlu. Under the leadership of Uzun Hasan, this kingdom gained power in the East, but because of its strong relations with Christian powers like the Empire of Trebizond and the Republic of Venice and the alliance between the Turcomans and the Karamanid tribe, Mehmed saw them as a threat to his own power.

=== War with Moldavia (1475–1476) ===
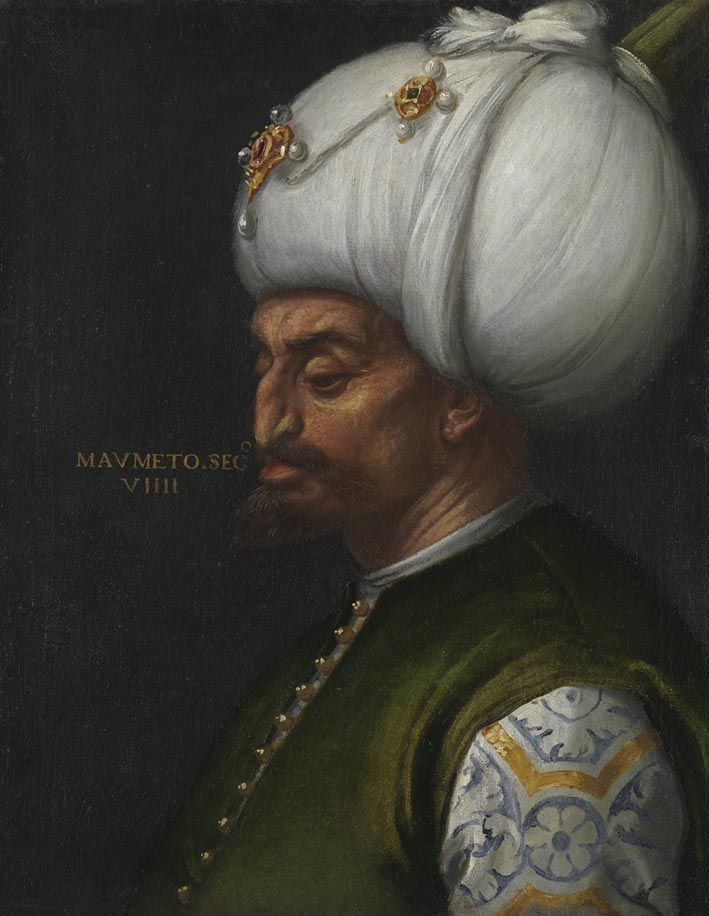
Mehmed the Second, portrait by Paolo Veronese

In 1456, Peter III Aaron agreed to pay the Ottomans an annual tribute of 2,000 gold ducats to ensure his southern borders, thus becoming the first Moldavian ruler to accept the Turkish demands. His successor Stephen the Great rejected Ottoman suzerainty and a series of fierce wars ensued. Stephen tried to bring Wallachia under his sphere of influence and so supported his own choice for the Wallachian throne. This resulted in an enduring struggle between different Wallachian rulers backed by Hungarians, Ottomans, and Stephen. An Ottoman army under Hadim Pasha (governor of Rumelia) was sent in 1475 to punish Stephen for his meddling in Wallachia; however, the Ottomans suffered a great defeat at the Battle of Vaslui. Stephen inflicted a decisive defeat on the Ottomans, described as "the greatest ever secured by the Cross against Islam," with casualties, according to Venetian and Polish records, reaching beyond 40,000 on the Ottoman side. Mara Brankovic (Mara Hatun), the former younger wife of Murad II, told a Venetian envoy that the invasion had been worst ever defeat for the Ottomans. Stephen was later awarded the title "Athleta Christi" (Champion of Christ) by Pope Sixtus IV, who referred to him as "verus christianae fidei athleta" ("the true defender of the Christian faith"). Mehmed II assembled a large army and entered Moldavia in June 1476. Meanwhile, groups of Tartars from the Crimean Khanate (the Ottomans' recent ally) were sent to attack Moldavia. Romanian sources may state that they were repelled. Other sources state that joint Ottoman and Crimean Tartar forces "occupied Bessarabia and took Akkerman, gaining control of the southern mouth of the Danube. Stephan tried to avoid open battle with the Ottomans by following a scorched-earth policy".

Finally, Stephen faced the Ottomans in battle. The Moldavians luring the main Ottoman forces into a forest that was set on fire, causing some casualties. According to another battle description, the defending Moldavian forces repelled several Ottoman attacks with steady fire from hand-guns. The attacking Turkish Janissaries were forced to crouch on their stomachs instead of charging headlong into the defenders positions. Seeing the imminent defeat of his forces, Mehmed charged with his personal guard against the Moldavians, managing to rally the Janissaries, and turning the tide of the battle. Turkish Janissaries penetrated inside the forest and engaged the defenders in man-to-man fighting.

The Moldavian army was utterly defeated (casualties were very high on both sides), and the chronicles say that the entire battlefield was covered with the bones of the dead, a probable source for the toponym (Valea Albă is Romanian and Akdere Turkish for "The White Valley").

Stephen the Great retreated into the north-western part of Moldavia or even into the Polish Kingdom and began forming another army. The Ottomans were unable to conquer any of the major Moldavian strongholds (Suceava, Neamț, and Hotin) and were constantly harassed by small-scale Moldavian attacks. Soon they were also confronted with starvation, a situation made worse by an outbreak of the plague, and the Ottoman army returned to Ottoman lands. The threat of Stephen to Wallachia continued for decades. That very same year Stephen helped his cousin Vlad the Impaler return to the throne of Wallachia for the third and final time. Even after Vlad's untimely death several months later Stephen continued to support, with force of arms, a variety of contenders to the Wallachian throne succeeding after Mehmed's death to instate Vlad Călugărul, half brother to Vlad the Impaler, for a period of 13 years from 1482 to 1495.

=== Conquest of Albania (1466–1478) ===
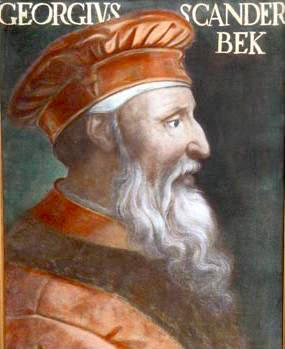
Portrait of Skanderbeg, prince of League of Lezhë

Skanderbeg, a member of the Albanian nobility and a former member of the Ottoman ruling elite, led a rebellion against the expansion of the Ottoman Empire into Europe. Skanderbeg, son of Gjon Kastrioti (who had joined the unsuccessful Albanian revolt of 1432–1436), united the Albanian principalities in a military and diplomatic alliance, the League of Lezhë, in 1444. Mehmed II was never successful in his efforts to subjugate Albania while Skanderbeg was alive, even though he twice (1466 and 1467) led the Ottoman armies himself against Krujë. After Skanderbeg died in 1468, the Albanians could not find a leader to replace him, and Mehmed II eventually conquered Krujë and Albania in 1478.

In spring 1466, Sultan Mehmed marched with a large army against Skanderbeg and the Albanians. Skanderbeg had repeatedly sought assistance from Italy, and believed that the ongoing Ottoman–Venetian War (1463–1479) offered a golden opportunity to reassert Albanian independence; for the Venetians, the Albanians provided a useful cover to the Venetian coastal holdings of Durrës (Italian: Durazzo) and Shkodër (Italian: Scutari). The major result of this campaign was the construction of the fortress of Elbasan, allegedly within just 25 days. This strategically sited fortress, at the lowlands near the end of the old Via Egnatia, cut Albania effectively in half, isolating Skanderbeg's base in the northern highlands from the Venetian holdings in the south. However, following the Sultan's withdrawal Skanderbeg himself spent the winter in Italy, seeking aid. On his return in early 1467, his forces sallied from the highlands, defeated Ballaban Pasha, and lifted the siege of the fortress of Croia (Krujë); they also attacked Elbasan but failed to capture it. Mehmed II responded by marching again against Albania. He energetically pursued the attacks against the Albanian strongholds, while sending detachments to raid the Venetian possessions to keep them isolated. The Ottomans failed again to take Croia, and they failed to subjugate the country. However, the winter brought an outbreak of plague, which would recur annually and sap the strength of the local resistance. Skanderbeg himself died of malaria in the Venetian stronghold of Lissus (Lezhë), ending the ability of Venice to use the Albanian lords for its own advantage. The Albanians were left to their own devices and were gradually subdued over the next decade.

After Skanderbeg died, Mehmed II personally led the siege of Shkodra in 1478–79, of which early Ottoman chronicler Aşıkpaşazade (1400–81) wrote, "All the conquests of Sultan Mehmed were fulfilled with the seizure of Shkodra." The Venetians and Shkodrans resisted the assaults and continued to hold the fortress until Venice ceded Shkodra to the Ottoman Empire in the Treaty of Constantinople as a condition of ending the war.

=== Crimean policy (1475) ===
A number of Turkic peoples, collectively known as the Crimean Tatars, had been inhabiting the peninsula since the early Middle Ages. After the destruction of the Golden Horde by Timur earlier in the 15th century, the Crimean Tatars founded an independent Crimean Khanate under Hacı I Giray, a descendant of Genghis Khan.

The Crimean Tatars controlled the steppes that stretched from the Kuban to the Dniester River, but they were unable to take control over the commercial Genoese towns called Gazaria (Genoese colonies), which had been under Genoese control since 1357. After the conquest of Constantinople, Genoese communications were disrupted, and when the Crimean Tatars asked for help from the Ottomans, they responded with an invasion of the Genoese towns, led by Gedik Ahmed Pasha in 1475, bringing Kaffa and the other trading towns under their control. After the capture of the Genoese towns, the Ottoman Sultan held Meñli I Giray captive, later releasing him in return for accepting Ottoman suzerainty over the Crimean Khans and allowing them to rule as tributary princes of the Ottoman Empire. However, the Crimean khans still had a large amount of autonomy from the Ottoman Empire, while the Ottomans directly controlled the southern coast.

=== Expedition to Italy (1480) ===
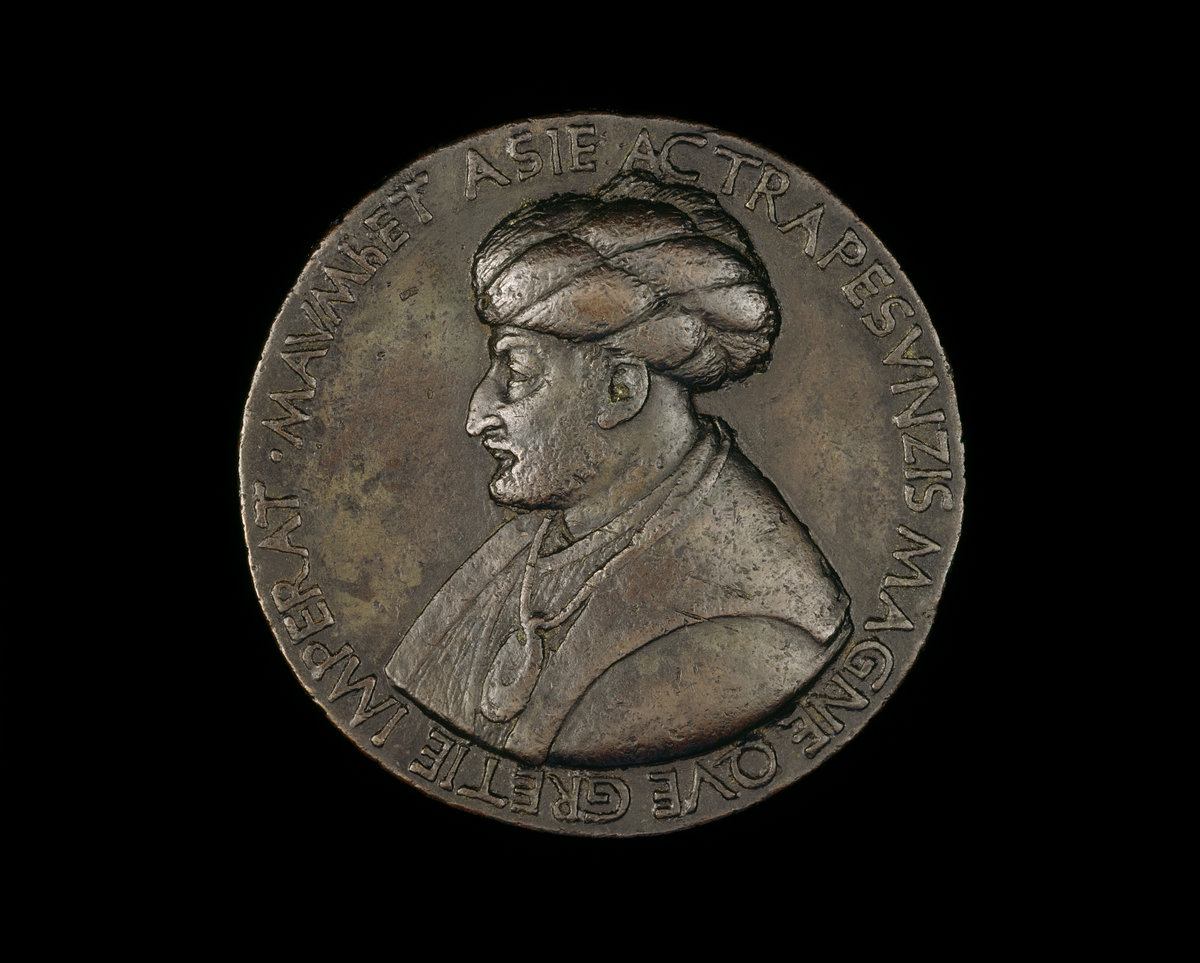
A bronze medal of Mehmed II the Conqueror by Bertoldo di Giovanni, 1480

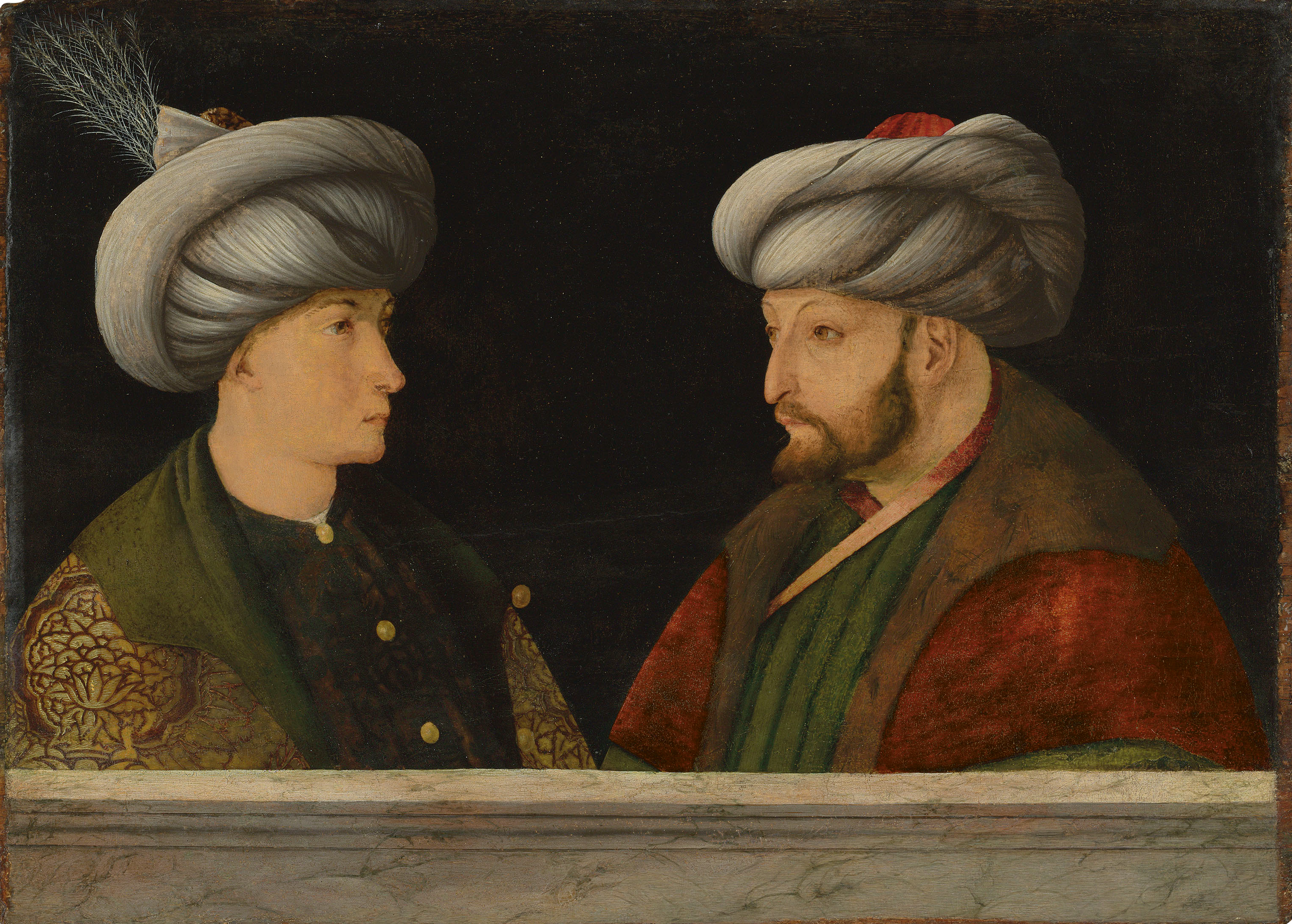
Portrait of Mehmed II with a young man on the left. It is assumed that Bellini himself did not create the two portraits in Istanbul, but only after his return to Venice. The young man is sometimes interpreted as Mehmed's son Cem, but there is no proof of this.

An Ottoman army under Gedik Ahmed Pasha invaded Italy in 1480, capturing Otranto. Because of lack of food, Gedik Ahmed Pasha returned with most of his troops to Albania, leaving a garrison of 800 infantry and 500 cavalry behind to defend Otranto in Italy. It was assumed he would return after the winter. Since it was only 28 years after the fall of Constantinople, there was some fear that Rome would suffer the same fate. Plans were made for the Pope and citizens of Rome to evacuate the city. Pope Sixtus IV repeated his 1481 call for a crusade. Several Italian city-states, Hungary, and France responded positively to the appeal. The Republic of Venice did not, however, as it had signed an expensive peace treaty with the Ottomans in 1479.

In 1481 king Ferdinand I of Naples raised an army to be led by his son Alphonso II of Naples. A contingent of troops was provided by king Matthias Corvinus of Hungary. The city was besieged starting 1 May 1481. After the death of Mehmed on 3 May, ensuing quarrels about his succession possibly prevented the Ottomans from sending reinforcements to Otranto. So, the Turkish occupation of Otranto ended by negotiation with the Christian forces, permitting the Turks to withdraw to Albania, and Otranto was retaken by Papal forces in 1481.

== Administration and culture ==
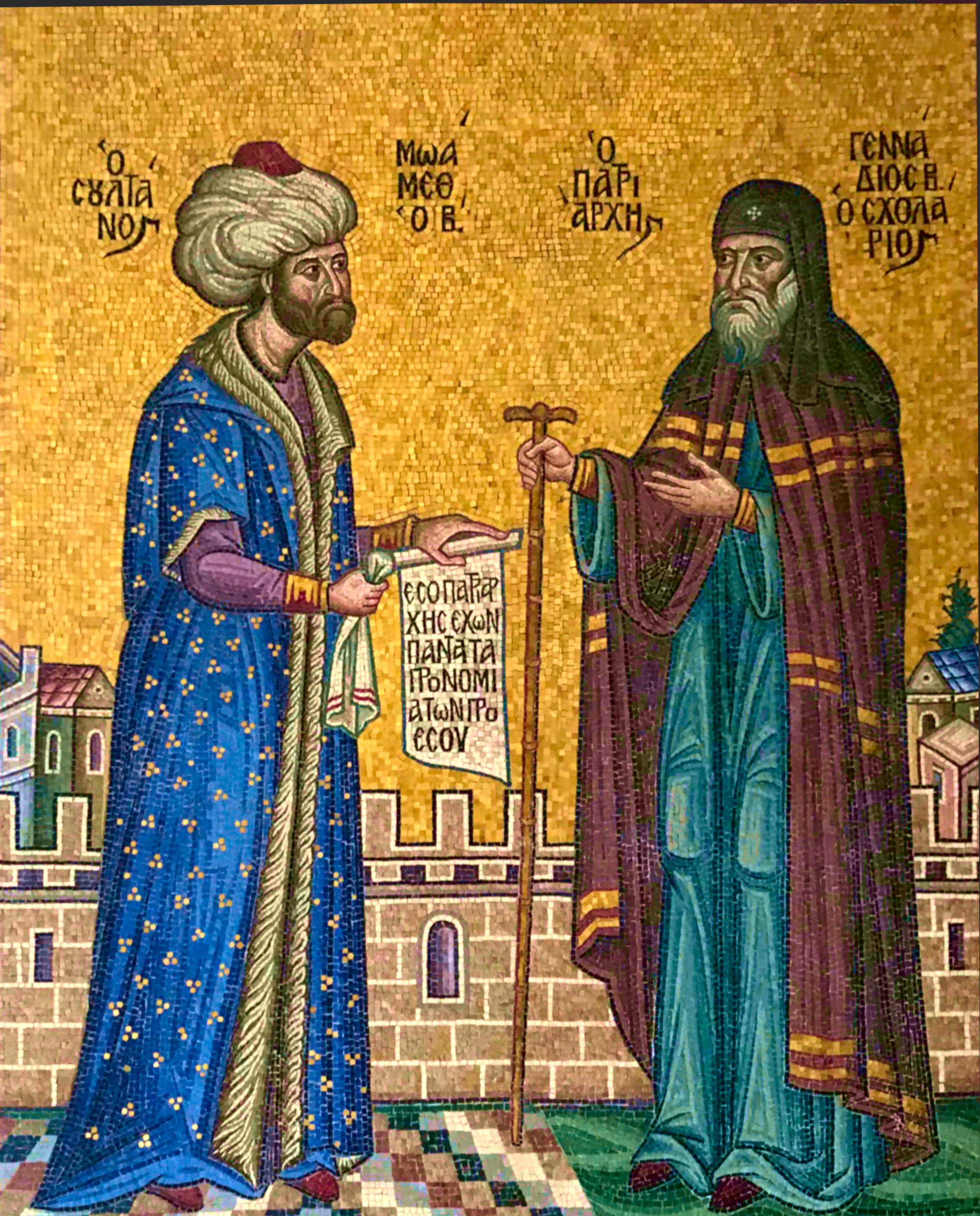
Sultan Mehmed the Conqueror with patriarch Gennadius II depicted on an 18th-century mosaic

He gathered Italian artists, humanists and Greek scholars at his court, allowed the Byzantine Church to continue functioning, ordered the patriarch Gennadius to translate Christian doctrine into Turkish, and called Gentile Bellini from Venice to paint his portrait as well as Venetian frescoes that are vanished today. He collected in his palace a library that included works in Greek, Persian, and Latin. Mehmed invited Muslim scientists and astronomers such as Ali Qushji and artists to his court in Constantinople, started a university, and built mosques (for example, the Fatih Mosque), waterways, and Istanbul's Topkapı Palace and the Tiled Kiosk. Around the grand mosque that he constructed, he erected eight madrasas, which, for nearly a century, kept their rank as the highest teaching institutions of the Islamic sciences in the empire.

Mehmed II allowed his subjects a considerable degree of religious freedom, provided they were obedient to his rule. After his conquest of Bosnia in 1463, he issued the Ahdname of Milodraž to the Bosnian Franciscans, granting them the freedom to move freely within the Empire, offer worship in their churches and monasteries, and practice their religion free from official and unofficial persecution, insult, or disturbance. However, his standing army was recruited from the Devshirme, a group that took Christian subjects at a young age (8–20 yrs): they were converted to Islam, then schooled for administration or the military Janissaries. This was a meritocracy which "produced from among their alumni four out of five Grand Viziers from this time on".

Within Constantinople, Mehmed established a millet, or an autonomous religious community, and appointed the former Patriarch Gennadius Scholarius as religious leader for the Orthodox Christians of the city. His authority extended to all Ottoman Orthodox Christians, and this excluded the Genoese and Venetian settlements in the suburbs, and excluded Muslim and Jewish settlers entirely. This method allowed for an indirect rule of the Christian Byzantines and allowed the occupants to feel relatively autonomous even as Mehmed II began the Turkish remodeling of the city, turning it into the Turkish capital, which it remained until the 1920s.

=== Return to Constantinople (1453–1478) ===
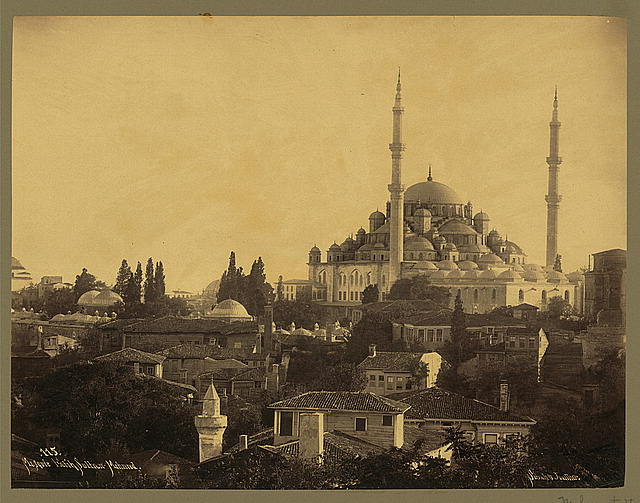
Historical photo of Fatih Mosque, built by order of Sultan Mehmed II in Constantinople, the first imperial mosque built in the city after the Ottoman conquest

After conquering Constantinople, when Mehmed II finally entered the city through what is now known as the Topkapi Gate, he immediately rode his horse to the Hagia Sophia, where he ordered the building to be protected. He ordered that an imam meet him there in order to chant the Muslim Creed: "I testify that there is no god but Allah. I testify that Muhammad is the messenger of Allah." The Orthodox cathedral was transformed into a Muslim mosque through a charitable trust, solidifying Islamic rule in Constantinople.

Mehmed's main concern with Constantinople was with rebuilding the city's defenses and repopulation. Building projects were commenced immediately after the conquest, which included the repair of the walls, construction of the citadel, a remarkable hospital with students and medical staff, a large cultural complex, two sets of barracks for the janissaries, a tophane gun foundry outside Galata, and a new palace. To encourage the return of the Greeks and the Genoese who had fled from Galata, the trading quarter of the city, he returned their houses and provided them with guarantees of safety. Mehmed issued orders across his empire that Muslims, Christians, and Jews should resettle in the city, demanding that five thousand households needed to be transferred to Constantinople by September. From all over the Islamic empire, prisoners of war and deported people were sent to the city; these people were called "Sürgün" in Turkish (Greek: σουργούνιδες sourgounides; "immigrants").

Mehmed restored the Ecumenical Orthodox Patriarchate (6 January 1454), appointing the monk Gennadios as the first Orthodox Patriarch. He also appointed a grand rabbi (Hakham Bashi), Moses Capsali, but it is not clear whether the rabbi's authority extended over all the Jews of the empire or only those living in Constantinople. Mehmed was also reputed to have established the Armenian Patriarchate of Constantinople, but this is merely a legend; the Armenian patriarchate was not created until sometime between 1526 and 1543. Older scholarship credited Mehmed with the creation of the millet system, a framework by which non-Muslim religious groups were granted fiscal and legal autonomy through their respective religious institutions. More recent scholarship considers these claims to be exaggerated, although a degree of autonomy was definitely granted to these communities in the 1400s and 1500s. The more centralized form of the millets is now regarded as a product of the late 18th and early 19th centuries.

In addition, he founded, and encouraged his viziers to found, a number of Muslim institutions and commercial installations in the main districts of Constantinople, such as the Rum Mehmed Pasha Mosque built by the Grand Vizier Rum Mehmed Pasha. From these nuclei, the metropolis developed rapidly. According to a survey carried out in 1478, there were then in Constantinople and neighboring Galata 16,324 households, 3,927 shops, and an estimated population of 80,000. The population was about 60% Muslim, 20% Christian, and 10% Jewish.

By the end of his reign, Mehmed's ambitious rebuilding program had changed the city into a thriving imperial capital. According to the contemporary Ottoman historian Neşri, "Sultan Mehmed created all of Istanbul". Fifty years later, Constantinople had again become the largest city in Europe.

Two centuries later, the well-known Ottoman itinerant Evliya Çelebi gave a list of groups introduced into the city with their respective origins. Even today, many quarters of Istanbul, such as Aksaray and Çarşamba, bear the names of the places of origin of their inhabitants. However, many people escaped again from the city, and there were several outbreaks of plague, so that in 1459 Mehmed allowed the deported Greeks to come back to the city. This measure apparently had no great success, since French voyager Pierre Gilles wrote in the middle of the 16th century that the Greek population of Constantinople was unable to name any of the ancient Byzantine churches that had been transformed into mosques or abandoned. This shows that the population substitution had been total.

=== Centralization of government ===
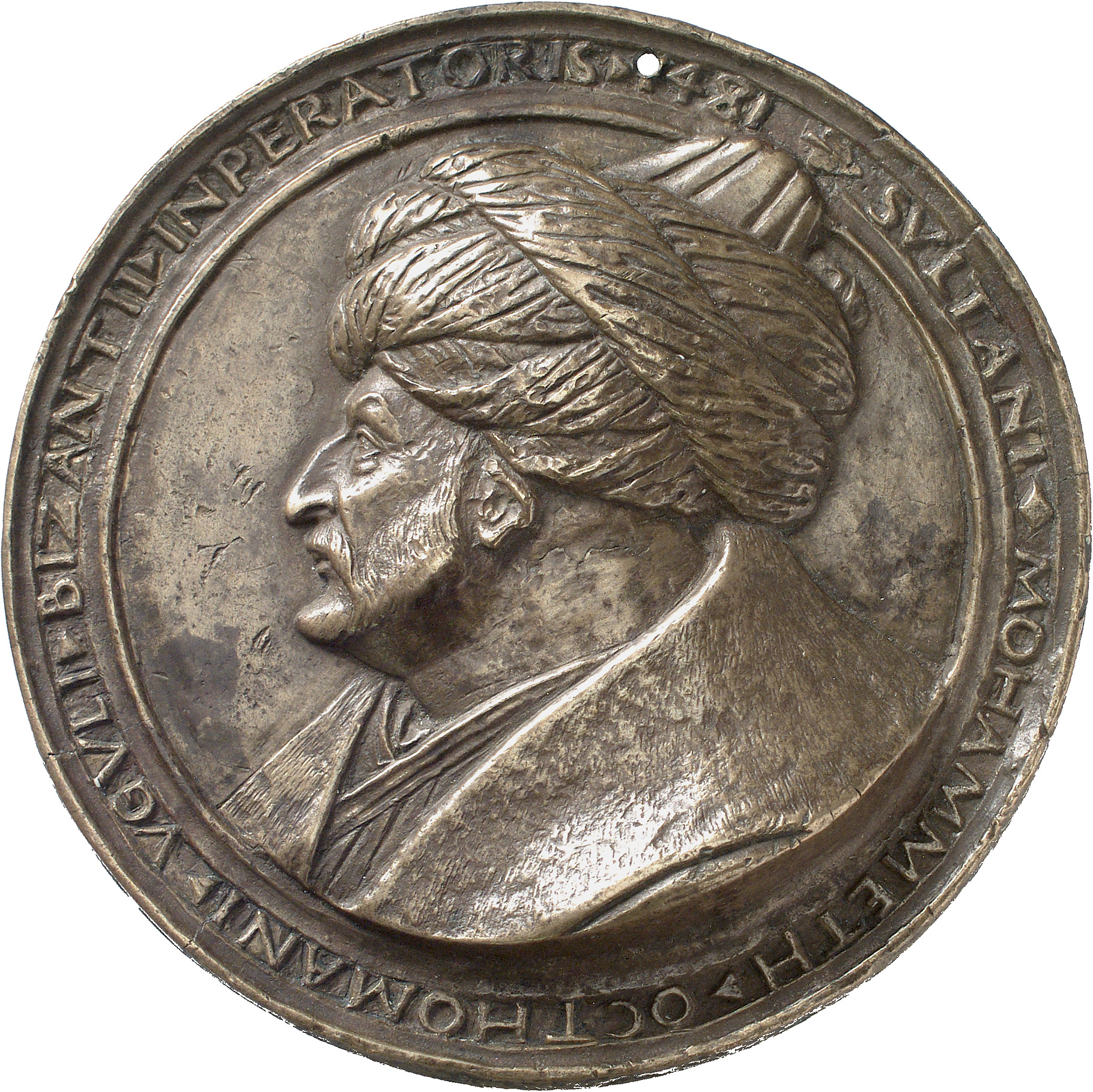
Medal of Mehmed II, with mention "Emperor of Byzantium" ("Byzantii Imperatoris 1481"), made by Costanzo da Ferrara (1450–1524)

Mehmed the Conqueror consolidated power by building his imperial court, the divan, with officials who would be solely loyal to him and allow him greater autonomy and authority. Under previous sultans the divan had been filled with members of aristocratic families that sometimes had other interests and loyalties than that of the sultan. Mehmed the Conqueror transitioned the empire away from the Ghazi mentality that emphasizes ancient traditions and ceremonies in governance and moved it towards a centralized bureaucracy largely made of officials of devşirme background. Additionally, Mehmed the Conqueror took the step of converting the religious scholars who were part of the Ottoman madrasas into salaried employees of the Ottoman bureaucracy who were loyal to him. This centralization was possible and formalized through a kanunname, issued during 1477–1481, which for the first time listed the chief officials in the Ottoman government, their roles and responsibilities, salaries, protocol and punishments, as well as how they related to each other and the sultan.

Once Mehmed had created an Ottoman bureaucracy and transformed the empire from a frontier society to a centralized government, he took care to appoint officials who would help him implement his agenda. His first grand vizier was Zaganos Pasha, who was of devşirme background as opposed to an aristocrat, and Zaganos Pasha's successor, Mahmud Pasha Angelović, was also of devşirme background. Mehmed was the first sultan who was able to codify and implement kanunname solely based on his own independent authority. Additionally, Mehmed was able to later implement kanunname that went against previous tradition or precedent. This was monumental in an empire that was so steeped in tradition and could be slow to change or adapt. Having viziers and other officials who were loyal to Mehmed was an essential part of this government because he transferred more power to the viziers than previous sultans had. He delegated significant powers and functions of government to his viziers as part of his new policy of imperial seclusions. A wall was built around the palace as an element of the more closed era, and unlike previous sultans Mehmed was no longer accessible to the public or even lower officials. His viziers directed the military and met foreign ambassadors, two essential parts of governing especially with his numerous military campaigns.

=== Interest in Western culture ===
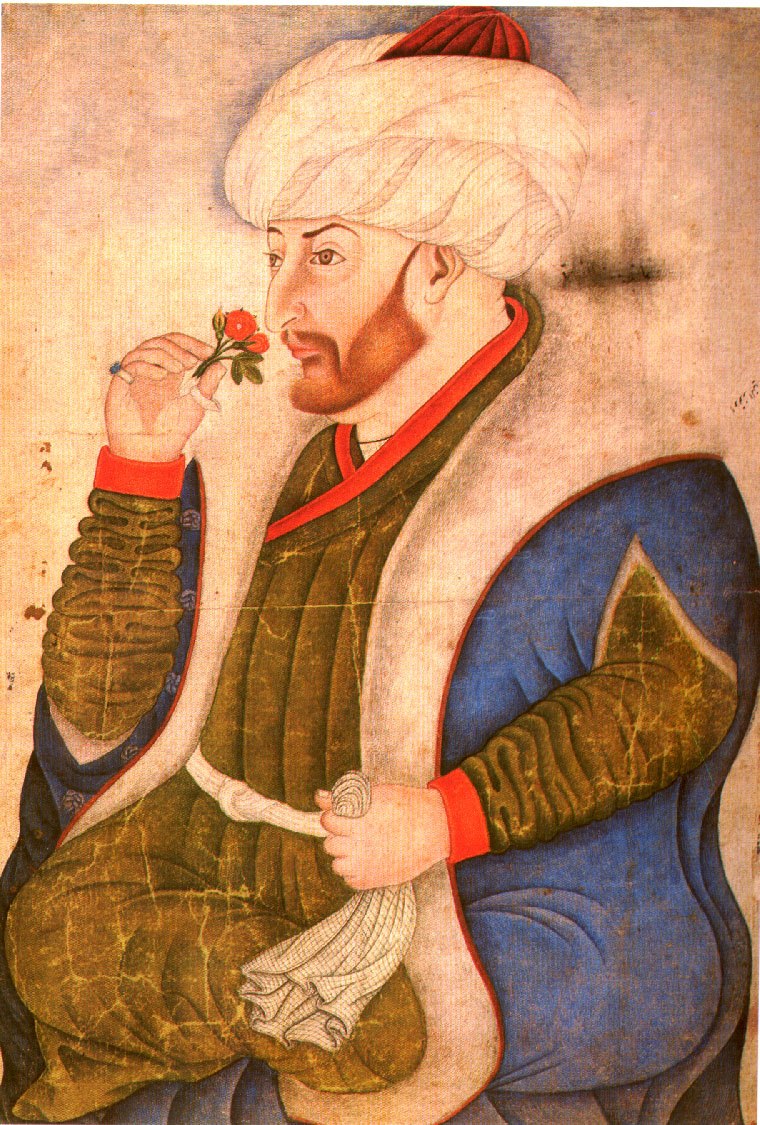
Portrait of Mehmed, by Nakkaş Sinan Bey (Topkapı Palace albums)

Aside from his efforts to expand Ottoman dominion throughout the Eastern Mediterranean, Mehmed II also cultivated a large collection of Western art and literature, many of which were produced by Renaissance artists. From a young age, Mehmed had shown interest in Renaissance art and Classical literature and histories, with his school books having caricaturistic illustrations of ancient coins and portraiture sketched in distinctly European styles. Furthermore, he reportedly had two tutors, one trained in Greek and another in Latin, who read him Classical histories, including those of Laertius, Livy, and Herodotus, in the days leading up to the fall of Constantinople.

From early on in his reign, Mehmed invested in the patronage of Italian Renaissance artists. His first documented request in 1461 was a commission from artist Matteo de' Pasti, who resided in the court of the lord of Rimini, Sigismondo Malatesta. This first attempt was unsuccessful, though, as Pasti was arrested in Crete by Venetian authorities accusing him of being an Ottoman spy. Later attempts would prove more fruitful, with some notable artists including Costanzo da Ferrara and Gentile Bellini both being invited to the Ottoman court.

Aside from his patronage of Renaissance artists, Mehmed was also an avid scholar of contemporary and Classical literature and history. This interest culminated in Mehmed's work on building a massive multilingual library that contained over 8000 manuscripts in Persian, Ottoman Turkish, Arabic, Latin, and Greek, among other languages. Of note in this large collection was Mehmed's Greek scriptorium, which included copies of Arrian's Anabasis of Alexander the Great and Homer's Iliad. His interest in Classical works extended in many directions, including the patronage of the Greek writer Kritiboulos of Imbros, who produced the Greek manuscript History of Mehmed the Conqueror, alongside his efforts to salvage and rebind Greek manuscripts acquired after his conquest of Constantinople.

Historians believe that Mehmed's widespread cultural and artistic tastes, especially those aimed towards the West, served various important diplomatic and administrative functions. His patronage of Renaissance artists have been interpreted as a method of diplomacy with other influential Mediterranean states, significantly many Italian states including the Kingdom of Naples and the Republic of Florence. Furthermore, historians speculate that his Greek scriptorium was used to educate Greek chancellery officials in an attempt to reintegrate former Byzantine diplomatic channels with several Italian states that conducted their correspondences in Greek. Importantly, historians also assert that Mehmed's vast collection of art and literature worked towards promoting his imperial authority and legitimacy, especially in his newly conquered lands. This was accomplished through various means, including the invocation of Mehmed's image as an Oriental neo-Alexandrian figure, which is seen through shared helmet ornaments in depictions of Mehmed and Alexander on medallion portraits produced during Mehmed's reign, as well as being a leitmotiv in Kritiboulous' work. Additionally, his commissioning of Renaissance artwork was, itself, possibly an attempt to break down Western-Oriental cultural binaries in order for Mehmed to present himself as a Western-oriented ruler, among the ranks of contemporary European Christian monarchs.

==== Collection of Christian art and relics ====
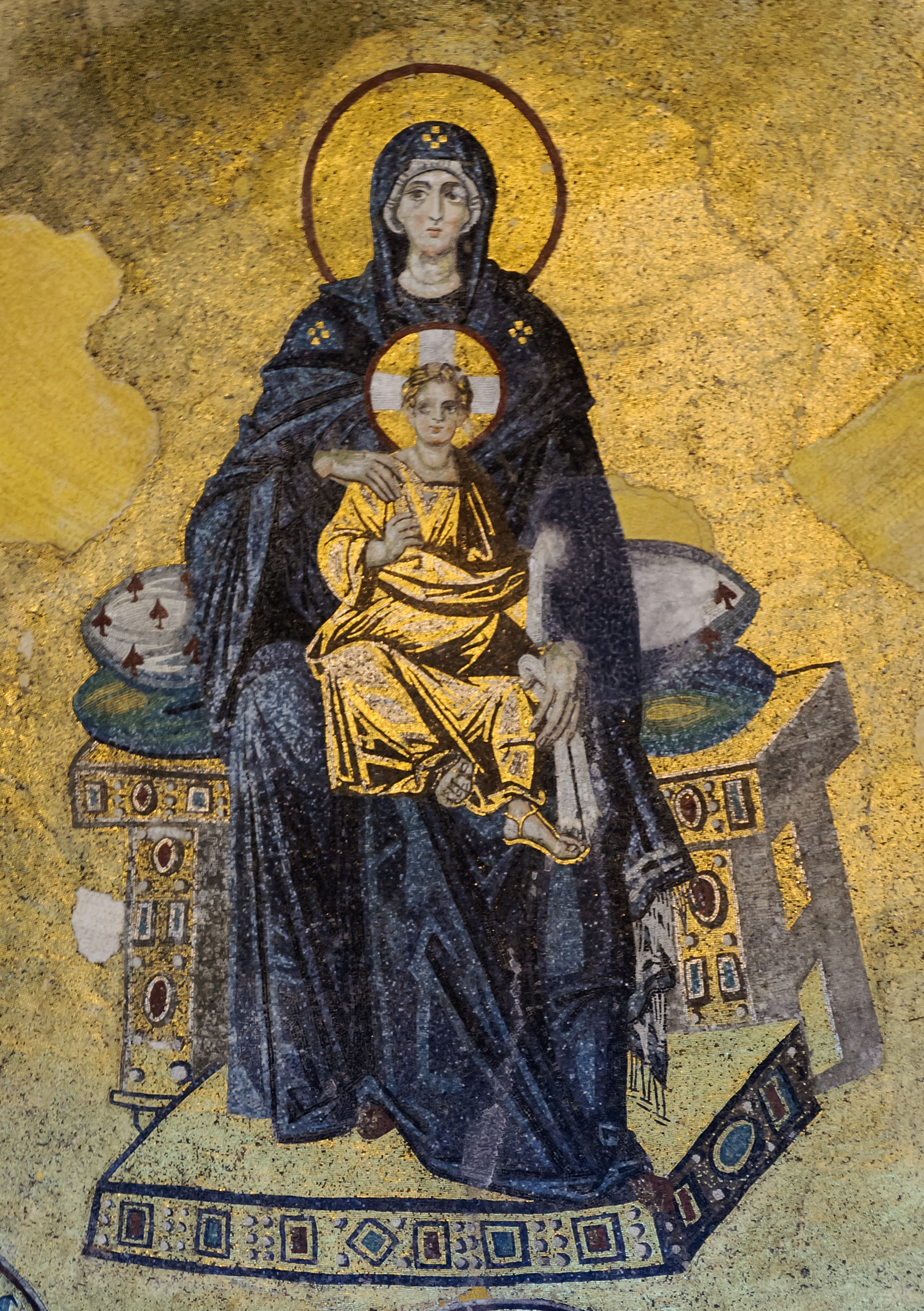
Mosaic of the Virgin and Child in the apse of the Hagia Sophia, preserved by Mehmed II after the fall of Constantinople.

A significant part of Mehmed II's foray into Western culture was his collection of Christian artwork and relics. The sultan obtained the relics after his conquest of Constantinople, when he ordered that all the relics in the local churches be brought to him. Among these relics were the putative skull and arm bone of St. John the Baptist and a stone on which, purportedly, Jesus was born. The relics were indeed very dear to him, as evidenced in a few anecdotes. For example, the sultan became "greatly distressed" when the royal librarian stepped on the aforementioned stone to reach a book high on a shelf. Again, after the Venetians had offered to purchase the same stone for 30,000 ducats, Mehmed replied that he would not sell it for even 100,000 ducats. This is confirmed by Guillaume Caoursin, a contemporary of the sultan, who writes that he would not sell any of his relics, for they were "more precious than money." Sources even indicate that Mehmed lit candles in front of the relics of St. John the Baptist "as a sign of veneration." In addition to Christian relics, Mehmed also maintained an interest in Christian artwork. The Hagia Sophia is a significant example, for, upon conquering Constantinople, Mehmed preserved the mosaics that it contained, which can still be seen today. Mehmed also himself commissioned a painting of the Virgin Mary with the Child Jesus, as two independent Italian sources report.

===== Purpose of the collection =====
Franz Babinger, a German orientalist, writes that Mehmed used these relics "for purposes of bargaining with Christians." However, Julian Raby, Oxford lecturer on Islamic art and director emeritus of the Freer Gallery of Art and the Arthur M. Sackler Gallery, argues the purpose of the collection is more unclear, mentioning that Niccolò Sagundino, a contemporary, writes of two conflicting opinions, the first being Babinger's and the second being that it expressed Mehmed's "sincere devotion."

===== Reaction to the collection =====
Mehmed's collection of Christian art and relics brought about various reactions from his contemporaries. Along with his general openness to Christianity, Mehmed's collection was a cause of an unfulfilled hope of some in the West that he would convert to Christianity. His son and successor, Bayezid II, suspected similarly, accusing Mehmed of "not believing in Muhammad." Although Mehmed's interest in Christianity and Christian culture caused concern among traditionalist factions, Gülru Necipoğlu writes, the sources written in Islamic languages do not support "such a perception of Mehmed's irreligiosity." Upon his accession to the sultanate, Bayezid, who hated "figural images of any sort," sold his father's art collection and also offered the relics to the rulers of Rhodes, France, and Italy as ransom for his brother, Cem.

== Family ==
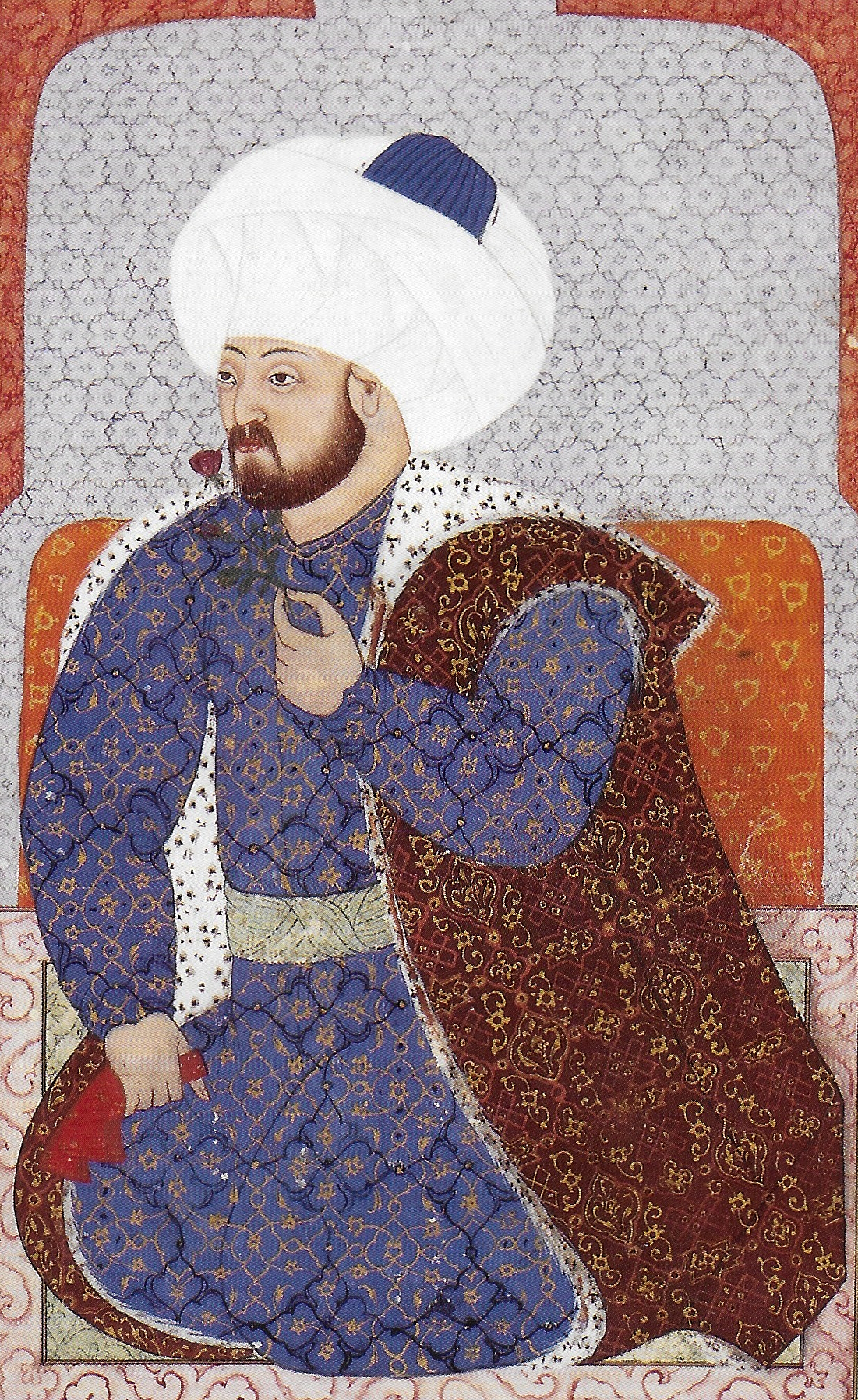
Portrait of Mehmet II, Human Physiognomy Concerning the Personal Dispositions of the Ottomans, 1579 (TSMK H.1563)

Mehmed II had at least eight known consorts, at least one of whom was his legal wife.

=== Consorts ===
Mehmed II's eight known consorts are:

- Gülbahar Hatun Mother of Gevherhan Hatun and Bayezid II.
- Gülşah Hatun. Mother of Şehzade Mustafa.
- Sittişah Mukrime Hatun. Also known as Sitti Hatun. She was the daughter of Dulkadiroğlu Süleyman Bey, the sixth ruler of Dulkadir. She was his legal wife, and it is believed that she had no children. Her niece Ayşe Hatun, her brother’s daughter, became a consort of Bayezid II.
- Çiçek Hatun. Mother of Şehzade Cem.
- Anna Hatun. Daughter of the Greek emperor of Trebizond David II Komnenos and his wife Helena Kantakuzenos. The marriage was initially proposed by her father, but Mehmed refused. However, after the conquest of Trebizond in 1461, Anna entered Mehmed's harem as a "noble tribute" or "noble guest" and stayed there for two years, after which Mehmed married her to Zaganos Pasha.
- Helena Hatun (1442–1469). Daughter of the despot of Morea Demetrios Palaiologos. W. Miller, citing Greek sources, writes that Mehmed did not trust Helena and feared that she might poison him. Furthermore, no Ottoman chronicle mentions a marriage between Mehmed II and Helena Palaiologina.
- Maria Hatun. Born Maria Gattilusio, she was the widow of Alexander Komnenos Asen, brother of Anna Hatun's father and by him she had a son, Alexios, executed by Mehmed II. She was judicated as the most beautiful woman of her age and entered in the harem after her capture in 1462.
- Hatice Hatun. daughter of Zaganos Mehmed Pasha and his first wife, Sitti Nefise Hatun. She entered the harem in 1453 and Mehmed divorced her in 1456

=== Sons ===
Mehmed II had at least three sons:

- Bayezid II (3 December 1447 – 10 June 1512) – son of Gülbahar Hatun. He succeeded his father as the Ottoman Sultan.
- Şehzade Mustafa (1450, Manisa – 25 December 1474, Konya) – son of Gülşah Hatun. Governor of Konya until his death. He was the favorite son of his father.
- Şehzade Cem (22 December 1459, Constantinople – 25 February 1495; Capua, Kingdom of Naples, Italy) – son of Çiçek Hatun. Governor of Konya after the death of his brother Mustafa, he fought for the throne against his half-brother Bayezid. He died in exile.

=== Daughters ===
Mehmed II had at least three daughters:

- Gevherhan Hatun (1446 – Constantinople, 1514) – daughter of Gülbahar Hatun. She was the mother of Sultan Ahmad Beg.
- Ayşe Hatun
- Kamerhan Hatun. She married her cousin Hasan Bey, son of Candaroğlu Kemaleddin İsmail Bey and Hatice Hatun, full-sister of Mehmed II. They had a daughter, Hanzade Hatun.

=== Policy regarding fratricide ===
His grandfather, Mehmed I, struggled over the throne with his brothers Süleyman, İsa, and Musa during the Ottoman Interregnum. This civil war lasted eight years and weakened the empire due to the casualties it inflicted and the division it sowed in Ottoman society. As a result, Mehmed II formally legalized the practice of fratricide in order to preserve the state and not further place strain on the unity as previous civil wars did. Mehmed II stated, "Of any of my sons that ascends the throne, it is acceptable for him to kill his brothers for the common benefit of the people (nizam-i alem). The majority of the ulama (Muslim scholars) have approved this; let action be taken accordingly". From that time, until the practice declined during the reigns of Ahmed I and Ibrahim, each sultan, upon ascending the throne, ordered the execution of his brothers and all their male descendants.

== Personal life ==
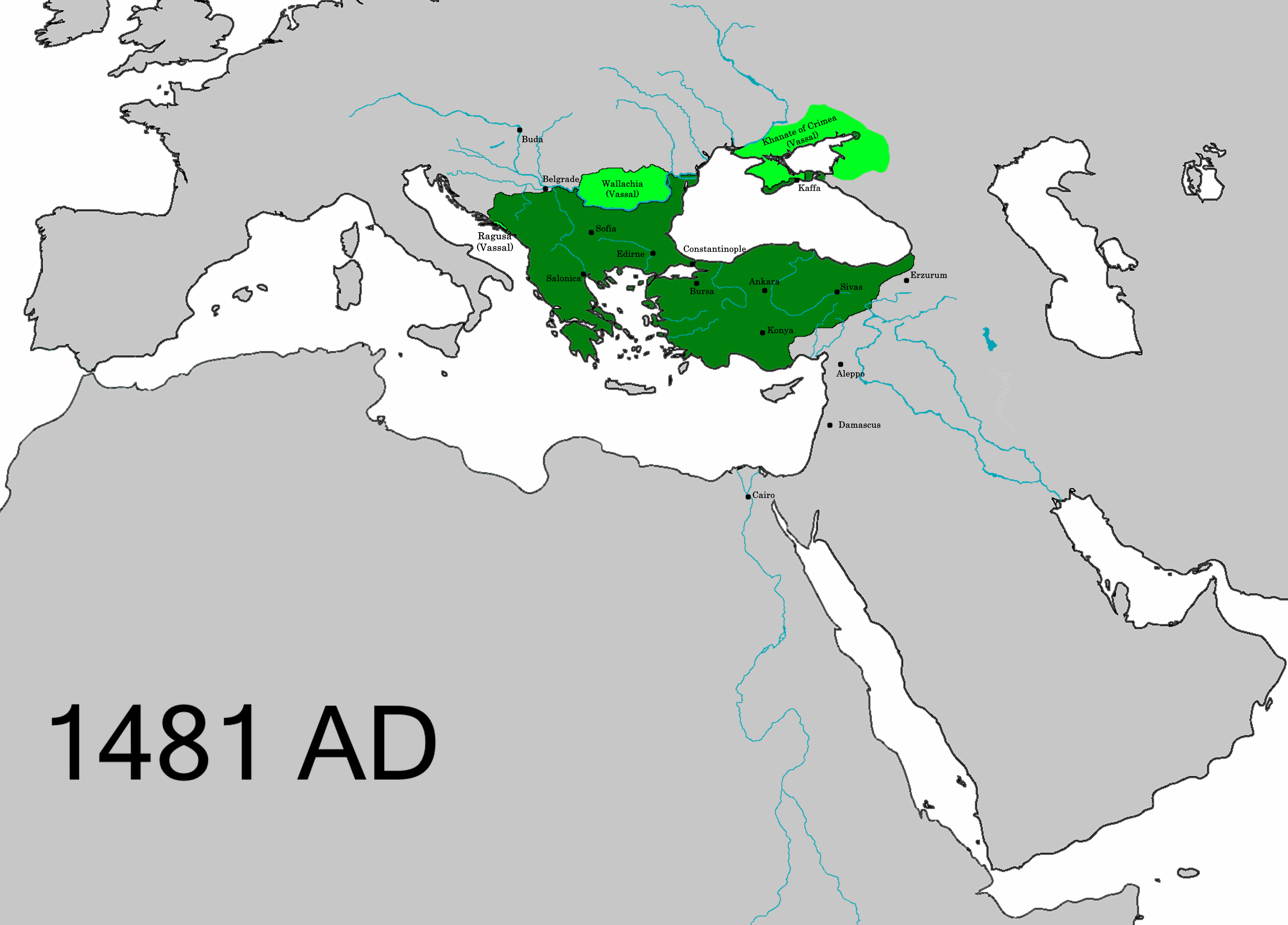
The territorial extent of the Ottoman Empire upon the death of Mehmed II

Mehmed had a strong interest in ancient Greek and medieval Byzantine civilization. His heroes were Achilles and Alexander the Great and he could discuss Christian religion with some authority. He was reputed to be fluent in several languages, including Turkish, Serbian, Arabic, Persian, Greek and Latin.

At times, he assembled the ulama, or learned Muslim teachers, and caused them to discuss theological problems in his presence. During his reign, mathematics, astronomy, and theology reached their highest level among the Ottomans. His social circle included a number of humanists and sages such as Ciriaco de' Pizzicolli of Ancona, Benedetto Dei of Florence and Michael Critobulus of Imbros, who mentions Mehmed as a Philhellene thanks to his interest in Grecian antiquities and relics. It was on his orders that the Parthenon and other Athenian monuments were spared destruction. Besides, Mehmed II himself was a poet writing under the name "Avni" (the helper, the helpful one) and he left a classical diwan poetry collection.

Some sources claim that Mehmed had a passion for his hostage and favourite, Radu the Fair. Young men condemned to death were spared and added to Mehmed's seraglio if he found them attractive, and the Porte went to great lengths to procure young noblemen for him.

== Death and legacy ==
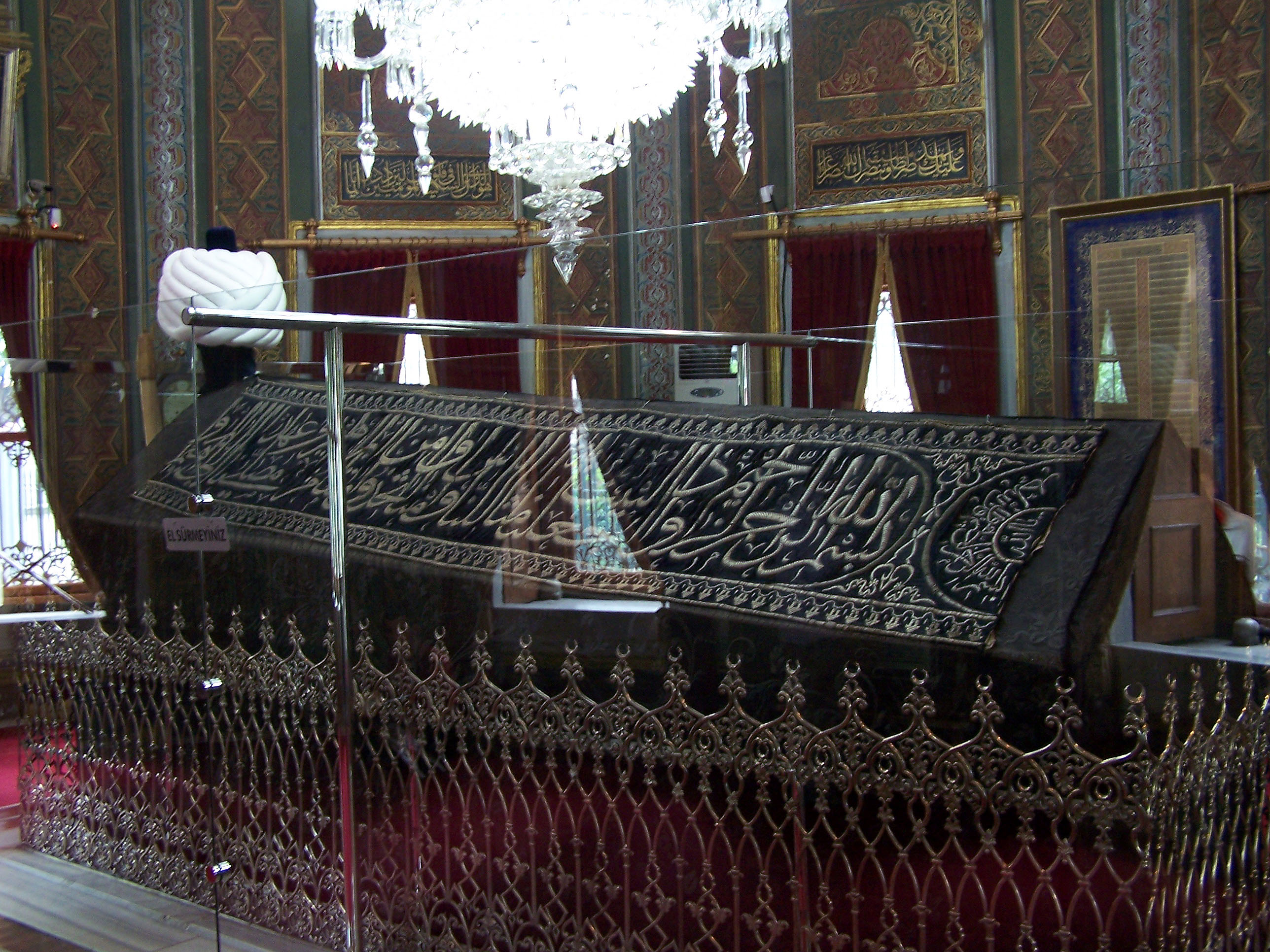
The tomb of Mehmed II (d. 1481) in Fatih, Istanbul

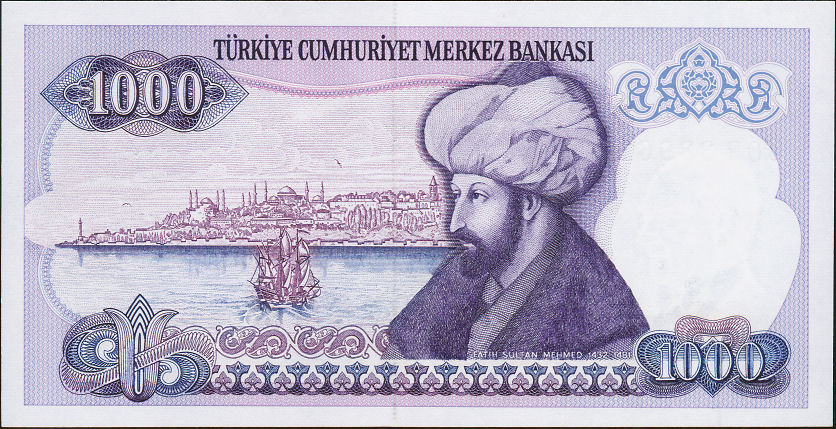
Mehmed II on the backside of 1,000 Turkish lira dated 1986.

In 1481 Mehmed marched with the Ottoman army, but upon reaching Maltepe, Istanbul, he became ill. He was just beginning new campaigns to capture Rhodes and southern Italy, however according to some historians his next voyage was planned to overthrow the Mamluk Sultanate of Egypt and to capture Egypt and claim the caliphate. But after some days he died, on 3 May 1481, at the age of forty-nine, and was buried in his türbe near the Fatih Mosque complex. According to the historian Colin Heywood, "there is substantial circumstantial evidence that Mehmed was poisoned, possibly at the behest of his eldest son and successor, Bayezid."

The news of Mehmed's death caused great rejoicing in Europe; church bells were rung, and celebrations held. The news was proclaimed in Venice thus: "La Grande Aquila è morta!" ('The Great Eagle is dead!')

Mehmed II is recognized as the first sultan to codify criminal and constitutional law, long before Suleiman the Magnificent; he thus established the classical image of the autocratic Ottoman sultan. Mehmed's thirty-year rule and numerous wars expanded the Ottoman Empire to include Constantinople, the Turkish kingdoms and territories of Asia Minor, Bosnia, Serbia, and Albania. Mehmed left behind an imposing reputation in both the Islamic and Christian worlds. According to historian Franz Babinger, Mehmed was regarded as a bloodthirsty tyrant by the Christian world and by a part of his subjects.

Istanbul's Fatih Sultan Mehmet Bridge (completed 1988), which crosses the Bosporus Straits, is named after him, and his name and picture appeared on the Turkish 1000 lira note from 1986 to 1992.

== Portrayal in popular culture ==
- Mehmed is the eponymous subject of Rossini's 1820 opera, Maometto II. Rossini and librettist Cesare della Valle offer a nuanced picture of Mehmed, portraying him as a fearless and magnanimous leader, even on the verge of conquering Negroponte.
- Portrayed by Sami Ayanoğlu in the Turkish film The Conquest of Constantinople (1951)
- Portrayed by Devrim Evin the Turkish film Fetih 1453 (2012). His childhood is portrayed by Ege Uslu.
- Portrayed by Mehmet Akif Alakurt in the Turkish television series Fatih (2013).
- Portrayed by İsmail Hacıoğlu in the Turkish surreal comedy series Osmanlı Tokadı (2013).
- Portrayed by Dominic Cooper in Dracula Untold.
- Portrayed by Kenan İmirzalıoğlu in the Turkish television series Mehmed Bir Cihan Fatihi (2018).
- Portrayed by Cem Yiğit Üzümoğlu in the Netflix docuseries Rise of Empires: Ottoman (2020)
- His childhood is portrayed by Miraç Sözer in web series Kızılelma: Bir Fetih Öyküsü (2023).
- Portrayed by Serkan Çayoğlu in the Turkish television series Mehmed: Sultan of Conquests (2024).
- Portrayed by Ulaşcan Kutlu in the Hungarian–Austrian television series about John Hunyadi Rise of the Raven (2024).
- He is chosen (as "Fatih") to be a remodelling of the character Cao Cao for the global version of the video game Honor of Kings.

== See also ==
- Classical Age of the Ottoman Empire
- Decline of the Byzantine Empire
- Kashifi (author of the Ḡazā-nāma-ye Rum)

== Notes ==
Mehmed II House of Osman Born: 30 March 1432 Died: 3 May 1481
Regnal titles
Preceded by Murad II	Ottoman Sultan; August 1444 ‒ September 1446	Succeeded by Murad II
Preceded by Murad II	Ottoman Sultan; 3 February 1451 – 3 May 1481	Succeeded by Bayezid II
