= Battle of Koyulhisar (1461) =

Ottoman victory over Aq Qoyunlu in Turkey

- Part of Ottoman wars in Asia
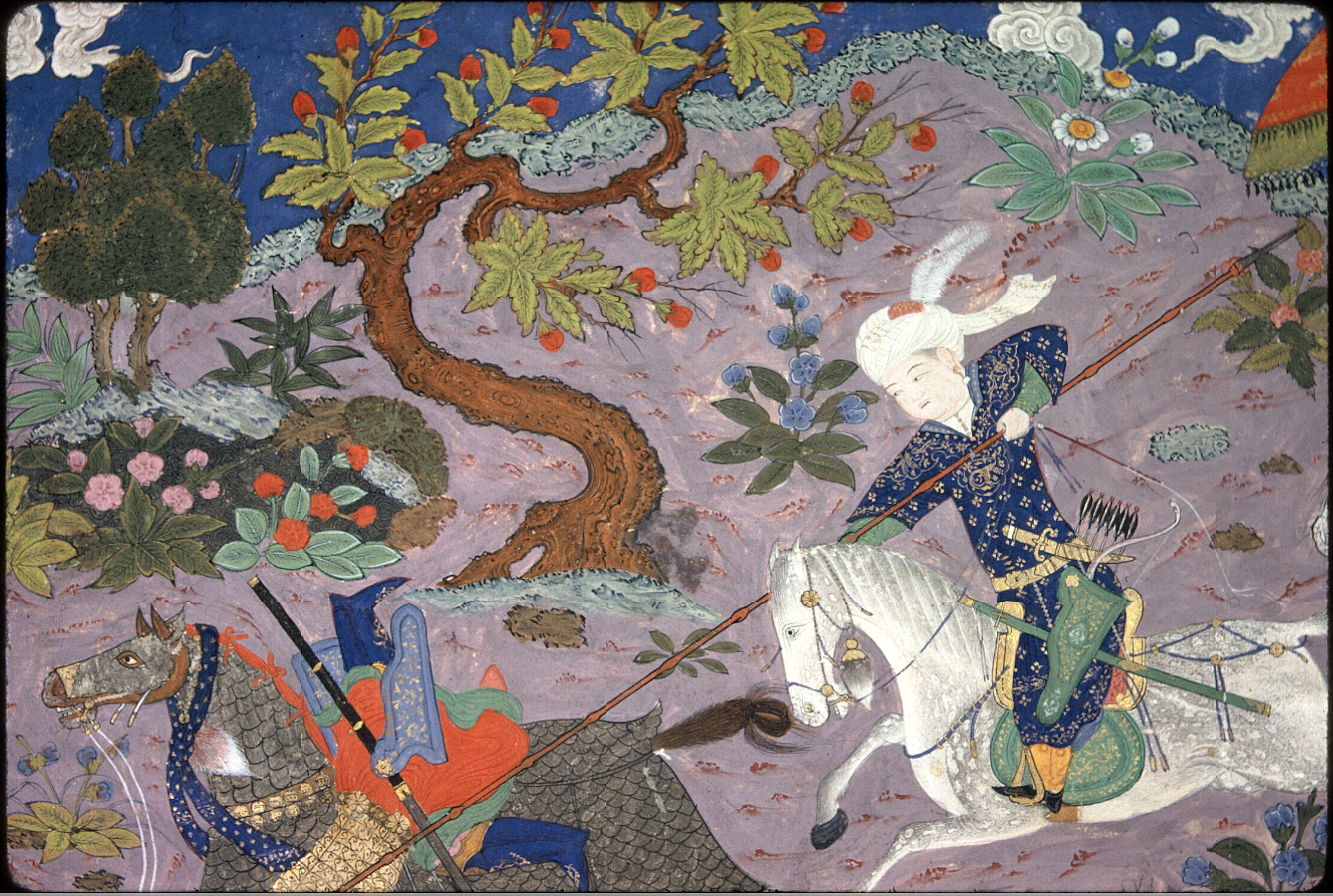
- A miniature depicting an engagement by an Aq Qoyunlu cavalryman. The defeated enemy soldier is equipped with armor and gear typical of 15th-century Anatolian–Iranian military culture, used by regional armies, including the Ottomans.
| Date | 1461 |
| Location | Koyulhisar, Turkey |
| Result | Ottoman victory |
| Territorial changes | Ottomans captured Koyulhisar castle. |

Belligerents
| Ottoman Empire | Aq Qoyunlu |

Commanders and leaders
| Mehmed II; Gedik Ahmed; Mahmud Angelović; Shah Suwar; Süleiman Bey; Ferhad Bey | Uzun Hasan; Hurshid Bey; Yar Ali Bey (surrendered) |

Units involved
| Infantry; Cavalry; Archers; Kapıkulu | Cavalry garrison |

Strength
| Unknown | Unknown garrison forces 4,000+ cavalry (relief army) |

Casualties and losses
| Unknown | Heavy |

The Battle of Koyulhisar was fought between an Aq Qoyunlu army commanded by Uzun Hasan and an Ottoman army under Mehmed II at Koyulhisar in 1461. Mehmed II was planning to advance against Trebizond and wanted to secure his flank against attack. Mehmed II and Uzun Hasan would fight each other repeatedly in the following decades.

== Background ==
Uzun Hasan's desire to place Trebizond under his protection was not merely a consequence of his alliance with the Greeks; he did not wish to see these coastal regions, which he had set his sights on, fall into Ottoman hands. For this reason, with or without provocation, he began encroaching upon Ottoman territories and in the process captured Koyulhisar. In response, Mehmed II dispatched Şarabdar Hamza Pasha to retake the fortress, but the pasha was unsuccessful and returned without achieving his objective. Moreover, this situation led to Aq Qoyunlu forces appearing even more frequently and assertively within Ottoman lands.

== Campaign ==
The increase in Uzun Hasan's incursions prompted Mehmed II to take personal command of the matter. The objective of this campaign was the capture of Trebizond. However, when Mehmed II marched against Trebizond, he first focused on neutralizing Uzun Hasan's forces, which could potentially strike him from the rear. For this reason, Mehmed II abandoned the coastal route and turned toward Sivas.

Uzun Hasan sought to block the passage of the Ottoman army by holding the mountain passes of the Taurus Mountains. Upon learning this, Mehmed II aimed to outflank Uzun Hasan and his army from the rear and therefore turned toward the extremely rugged and difficult route leading to Mardin. Mahmud Pasha's forces advanced as the vanguard. These units seized the most strategic points in the region, then cleared forests and improved the narrow and rugged paths along the army's route, widening and leveling them. In this way, Mehmed II sought to prevent his opponent from carrying out guerrilla attacks and instead aimed to force a battle in open terrain.

The Taurus Mountains were extremely high and characterized by narrow passes, deep ravines, sheer cliffs, and steep ridges. In short, the region contained many dangerous points. It was not easy for a regular army to pass through such terrain; nevertheless, Mehmed II maneuvered his army—composed of infantry and cavalry—with great precision and in full battle order, crossing the mountains within eighteen days.

In terms of formation, the infantry always marched at the front, while the baggage and pack animals—the army's weight—were positioned in the center. The cavalry formed the rear guard and remained behind, together with Mehmed II at the center. Whenever the army passed through narrow defiles, the formation was adjusted: the forward and rear units were shaped into a horn-like formation with pointed ends, thereby forming a defensive front. On both flanks of the vanguard marched archers and kapıkulu guards. The kapıkulu troops carried spears on their shoulders, while the archers advanced with bows drawn and arrows nocked, ready to respond to attacks that might come from multiple directions.

== Battle ==
Uzun Hasan began launching night attacks against Mehmed II. In response, Mehmed II maintained battle order during daytime marches, and at night fires were lit at a distance from the camp while the encampment itself was guarded by strong detachments. Observation posts were placed at key points so that the army remained informed of all developments. Thanks to this discipline, Uzun Hasan's night attacks proved unsuccessful.

Mehmed II arrived before Koyulhisar and established his camp there. At that time, Yar Ali Bey was the darugha of Koyulhisar. Mehmed II cut off the approaches to the fortress and placed it under siege, establishing artillery batteries in front of the walls and subjecting it to bombardment.

Uzun Hasan attempted to relieve the fortress by sending Hurshid Bey toward the pass held by Gedik Ahmed Pasha. Hurshid Bey, accompanied by a special Aq Qoyunlu force familiar with the region, encountered Gedik Ahmed Pasha in a narrow defile. A fierce battle ensued, and Gedik Ahmed Pasha defeated the Aq Qoyunlu troops and pursued them as far as Uzun Hasan's camp. Meanwhile, the garrison of Koyulhisar, unwilling to suffer the same fate and unable to withstand the intense artillery fire, surrendered the fortress to Mehmed II within three days.

Although Hurshid Bey was defeated, these forces did not constitute the main Aq Qoyunlu army. Mehmed II continued his advance with the aim of breaking the principal Aq Qoyunlu forces, reached Erzincan, and established his camp at Yassıçemen—the same site where Sultan Kayqubad I had once defeated Jalal al-Din Khwarazmshah.

Upon learning that Mehmed II had taken position at Yassıçemen, Uzun Hasan deployed a force of 2,000 men composed of his relatives and emirs at Dashkird, while he himself set an ambush with 2,000 cavalry at the position of Keybud. Şehsuvar of Dulkadir, Süleyman Bey, and Ferhad Bey arrived at Dashkird and clashed with Aq Qoyunlu forces there. When the Ottoman troops were defeated, Mehmed II redirected his advance toward Kelkit.

== Truce ==
From there, Mehmed II sent a letter to Uzun Hasan proposing a truce. Uzun Hasan sent his mother, Sara Khatun, as part of the diplomatic delegation, and peace was concluded. However, Mehmed II detained Sara Khatun and took her with him as he moved to besiege Trebizond, thereby neutralizing Uzun Hasan's ability to strike him from the rear.
