= Turahanoğlu family =

Ottoman noble family

Turahanoğulları
- Country: Ottoman Empire
- Founded: 1389
- Titles: ghazi ("warrior") akinci ("raider")

Turahanoğlu family (Turkish: Turahanoğulları, Turahanoğlu ailesi) was one of the families that led the akıncı corps in Ottoman Empire between the 15th-16th centuries.

== History ==
The family was of Turkish Yürük origin, as it descended from Yiğit Bey of Saruhan, who would become a prominent general. In 1390 the Ottomans populated parts of Macedonia (in modern-day northern Greece) and the Yürüks from Saruhan followed them. Pasha Yiğit Bey settled with the rest of the tribe in the borderland and was appointed as a leader of his troublesome fellow tribesmen. In 1392 Pasha Yiğit Bey led the army that took Skopje (Turkish: Üsküp), thus he was named the conqueror of Skopje by the Ottoman Empire.

Pasha Yiğit Bey became the first lord (Turkish: uc beği) of the Sanjak of Üsküp, the borderland province of Ottoman Empire, and served for 21 years, from 1392 to 1413. He died and was buried in Skopje. He had two sons, Turahan Bey and Ishak Bey. Turahan became a prominent Ottoman military commander and governor of Thessaly from 1423 until his death in 1456. He participated in many Ottoman campaigns of the second quarter of the 15th century, fighting against the Byzantines as well as against the Crusade of Varna. Turahan begat Ahmet and Ömer. The latter was an Ottoman general and governor, active chiefly in southern Greece, who fought in the Morea against both the Byzantines in the 1440s and 1450s and against the Venetians in the 1460s, while in 1456, he conquered the Latin Duchy of Athens. He also fought in Albania, north-east Italy, Wallachia and Anatolia.

== Members ==
- Turahan Bey (fl. 1413–d. 1456), general and governor, son of Pasha Yiğit Bey
  - Turahanoğlu Ahmed Bey
  - Turahanoğlu Ömer Bey (fl. 1435–1484), general and governor
    - Hasan Bey
    - Idris Bey

== Family tree ==
After Franz Babinger in the Encyclopedia of Islam:

Pasha Yiğit Bey
Ishak Bey	Turahan Bey
Isa Bey Isaković	Ahmed Bey	Ömer Bey
Hasan Bey	Idris Bey
