= Battle of Corinth order of battle =

Battle of Corinth order of battle may refer to:

- First Battle of Corinth order of battle
- Second Battle of Corinth order of battle

== See also ==
- Battle of Corinth (disambiguation)
