= Battle of Mystras (1464) =

- Part of the Ottoman–Venetian War (1463–1479)
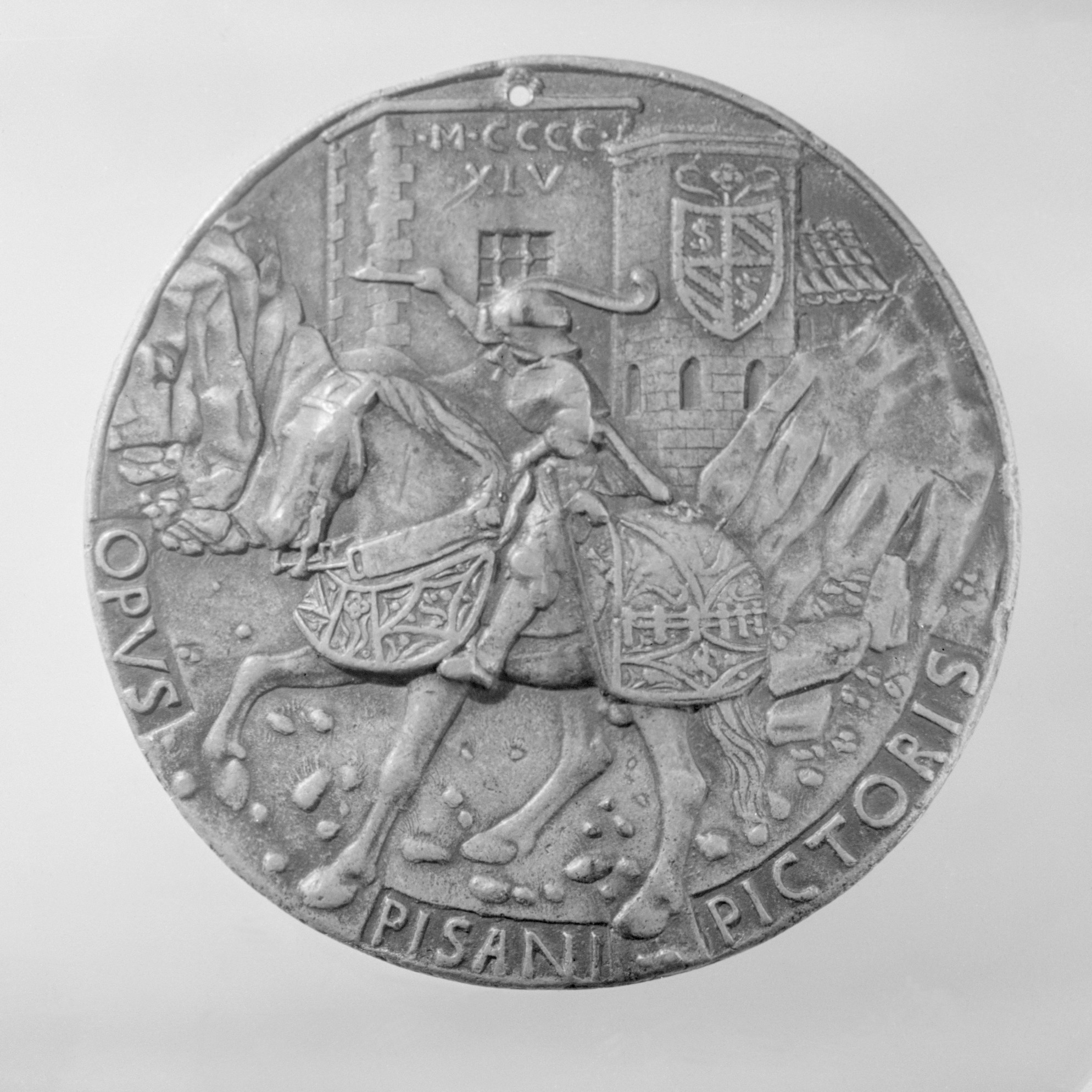
- Sigismondo Malatesta depicted on a medallion with his armor.
Date	August 1464
Location	Mystras, Morea, Greece
Result	Ottoman victory

Belligerents
Ottoman Empire	Republic of Venice

Commanders and leaders
Turahanoğlu Ömer Bey	Sigismondo Malatesta; Peter Bua; Aleksios Bua; Mihail Ralli; Mihail Ralli Drimi; Protostrator Isaac

Strength
12,000	1,400 soldiers from Methoni alone, 400 mounted crossbowmen, and 300 infantry (in total 2,100). An unknown number of armies under Malatesta. And hundreds of cavalry and soldiers provided by regional commanders.

The Battle of Mystras was a land battles fought during the Venetian-Ottoman wars.

== Background ==
Sigismondo Malatesta became the commander of the Venetian land forces after Bertoldo d’Este was killed during the Siege of Corinth.

Sigismondo Malatesta had repeatedly hoped to bring the entire island of Morea under Venetian rule. In the Morea Peninsula, he indeed found a considerable number of supporters among the Greeks and Albanians. Peter and Alexios Bua, who controlled many places in the mountains and were strong enough to provide hundreds of cavalry to Venice, were fighting under the Venetian banner. Among the notable figures of Morea, Michael Rallis, his relative Michael Rallis Drimis, and the Protostrator Isaac had taken the side of Venice.

== Battle ==
When Sigismondo Malatesta arrived in Methoni on 8 August 1464, he found that 1,400 soldiers from his army, along with 400 crossbowmen and 300 infantrymen, were waiting for him there. Malatesta constantly clashed with the Signoria, complaining either that they demanded too much from him or that they provided too little support. Under these conditions, success in the land campaign was impossible. After capturing a few towns, Malatesta finally attacked Mystras. He managed to overcome the two outer walls, but despite all his efforts, he could not fully capture the fortress situated atop a high rocky cliff. Unfamiliar with the region and particularly worried about the interruption of supply deliveries, Malatesta lifted the siege and hastily retreated, receiving word that Turahanoğlu Ömer Bey was marching with an army of 12,000 men to reinforce the Turkish forces. Malatesta's officers, unwilling to withdraw without a fight, engaged the Ottoman cavalry near Mystras. They were all killed along with their soldiers.
