= Battle of Patras =

Battle of Patras or Siege of Patras can refer to one of a number of military engagements at or near the city of Patras in the northwestern Peloponnese in Greece:

- Siege of Patras (805 or 807), by the Slavs of the Peloponnese and Saracens
- Siege of Patras (1429), by the Byzantine Despot of the Morea, Constantine XI Palaiologos
- Battle of Patras (1466), battle between the Ottoman and Venetian armies during the Ottoman–Venetian War (1463–1479)
- Battle of Patras (1687), battle between the Ottoman and Venetian armies during the Morean War
- Battle of Patras (1770), by the Russians and Greek rebels during the Orlov Revolt
- Battle of Patras (1772), naval battle between the Ottoman and Russian fleets
- Siege of Patras (1821), by the Greek rebels during the early days of the Greek War of Independence
- Battle of Patras (1822), naval battle between the Ottoman and Greek fleets during the Greek War of Independence
