= Pasha Yiğit Bey =

Ottoman civil and military officer (died 1413)

Personal details
- Born: Principality of Saruhan
- Died: c. 1413
- Relations: Isak Beg and Turahan Bey (sons)
- Buried: Meddah mosque, Skopje
- Family: Turahanoğlu

Military service
- Allegiance: Ottoman Empire
- Years of service: c. 1390–1413
- Wars and campaigns: Battle of Kosovo, capture of Skopje

Pasha Yiğit Bey or Saruhanli Pasha Yiğit Bey (Serbo-Croatian: Pašait-beg, also Pasaythus or Basaitus; died 1413) was an Ottoman Turkish civil and military officer at the end of the 14th and beginning of the 15th century.

== Life ==
He was born in Manisa and was of Yörük origin. Yiğit was the tutor of Ishak Bey, the second ruler of Sanjak of Üsküp, and the father of Turahan Bey an Ottoman general, conqueror of Thessaly and warden of its marches. The Ottoman Sultan granted large land estates to Pasha Yiğit Bey and to Ishak Bey for their merits.

He died in Skopje, and was buried in the yard of the notable Meddah Mosque. The mosque and türbe were destroyed during World War II.

== Military career ==
Pasha Yiğit Bey was one of the Ottoman commanders in the Battle of Kosovo in 1389. In 1390, the Ottoman Turks populated parts of Macedonia (in modern-day northern Greece) with nomadic Yürüks from Saruhan. Since Pasha Yiğit Bey was also of Yürük nomadic tribal origin (from Saruhan) he also settled in the same borderland (Turkish: uc) and was appointed as a leader of his fellow tribesmen. In 1392, Pasha Yiğit Bey led the army that captured Skopje (Turkish: Üsküp), thus he was named the conqueror of Skopje by the Ottoman Sultan Bayezid I.

Pasha Yiğit Bey became the first lord (Turkish: uc beği) of the Skopsko Krajište, the borderland province of the Ottoman Empire, and served for 21 years, from 1392 to 1413. In spring of 1390, after the Battle of Kosovo, Yiğit was sent by Sultan Bayazid to invade Bosnia which he did, undertaking two campaigns. Pasha Yiğit Bey managed to capture Đurađ II Balšić in a battle and released him after the ransom was paid.

== Family tree ==
After Franz Babinger in the Encyclopedia of Islam:

Pasha Yiğit Bey
Ishak Bey	Turahan Bey
Isa Bey Isaković	Ahmed Bey	Ömer Bey
Hasan Bey	Idris Bey

== See also ==
- Dzhigit

New title	Ottoman governor of the Üsküb frontier 1392–1415	Succeeded by Ishak Bey
