= Vettore Cappello =

Politician and admiral of the Republic of Venice

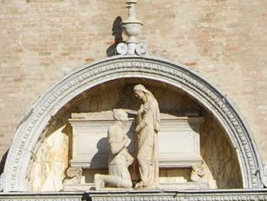
- Funeral monument of Cappello kneeling before Saint Helena, Church of Sant'Elena, Venice
- Born: c. 1400; Venice
- Died: 13 March 1467; Negroponte
- Spouse: Lucia Querini
- Children: Andrea, Lorenzo, Paolo, Alvise, Elena, Paolina
- Military career
- Allegiance: Republic of Venice
- Branch: Navy
- Rank: Captain General of the Sea
- Conflicts: First Ottoman–Venetian War: Battle of Patras (1466)

Member of the Savi agli Ordini
- In office October 1439 – October 1440
- In office October 1440 – March 1441

Captain of the Trade Envoy to Romania
- In office 1443

Venetian Senator
- In office August 1444 – March 1449

Member of the Council of Ten
- In office 1447

Captain of the Gulf
- In office March 1449 – May 1450
- Occupations: Merchant, politician
- Years active: 1420–1467
- Parents: Giorgio (father); Coronea Lando (mother)

Vettore Cappello (Venetian: Vettor Cappello; c. 1400–1467) was a merchant, statesman and military commander of the Republic of Venice. After an early career as a merchant that gained him substantial wealth, he began his political career in 1439. His ascent to higher offices was rapid. He is chiefly remembered for his advocacy of a decisive policy against the Ottoman Empire, and his command of Venetian forces as Captain General of the Sea during the lead-up to and the first stages of the First Ottoman–Venetian War.

== Origin and early life ==
Vettore Cappello was born to Giorgio Cappello and Coronea Lando. The date of his birth is unknown; his epitaph records that he died at the age of 63, but when he was inscribed at the Balla d'Oro in 1420, he is recorded as being twenty years of age, and serving as a sailor in the trade convoy to Alexandria. His family was engaged in commerce, and Vettore appears to have been active in his family's commercial interests: along with his brothers, he maintained agents at Bruges and London for a decade from 1431 on, and he was patrono (responsible for the equipping and manning of a trade galley) in the muda (annual trade convoy) to Flanders in the years 1428, 1438, and 1441. In 1436 he married Lucia Querini, daughter of Marco, with whom he had six children: Andrea, Lorenzo, Paolo, Alvise, Elena and Paolina.

== Political and military career ==
Cappello began his political career in October 1439, when he was elected to the savii agli Ordini (commissioners on naval matters). Cappello held the same office again in October 1440 – March 1441, then was member of the Ragion Nuove office in 1442, and captain of the trade convoy to Romania (Constantinople and the Black Sea) in 1443. In 1442–1443 he was also elected to various other offices that he did not carry out: captain of the convoys to Modon and the Barbary Coast, and sopracomito (galley captain) in the guard fleet of the Gulf (the Adriatic Sea). In spring 1444 he commanded the two galleys that brought to Venice Mary of Aragon, the bride-to-be of Leonello d'Este, Marquis of Ferrara. In August 1444 and again in the next year, he was elected to the Venetian Senate, and in 1447 to the Council of Ten. In September 1448 he was elected to the zonta (extraordinary commission) of the Ten, and served in the Senate until March 1449, when he was elected Captain of the Gulf.

=== Captain of the Gulf ===
On 7 April he was given his orders, which initially included the usual tasks of patrolling the Adriatic. However, events elsewhere soon changed his mission. On 26 April, he received new instructions to proceed with the annexation of the County Palatine of Cephalonia and Zakynthos, whose cession from the ruling Tocco family was being negotiated. Soon after he arrived at Corfu, however, the Republic reversed course, fearing a lasting military commitment against the Ottoman Turks, and decided to simply establish a Venetian protectorate over the Tocco domains, rather than annex them. Indeed, the Tocco representative, Giacomo Rosso, repeatedly asked for the aid of Cappello's fleet against the Turks, but was rebuffed, in part because Cappello was engaged in the brief conflict that had broken out between Venice and the King of Naples, Alfonso of Aragon, in July. Cappello's actions during the war are not well known; at the start of the conflict, when the new Captain General of the Sea, Alvise Loredan, was still in Venice, he conducted raids against the Neapolitan shores, but in August he was ordered to keep watch over the entry of the Straits of Otranto and prohibit any Aragonese vessels from operating in the area. He was then ordered to join with Loredan in conducting an attack on Messina. In September and November he was sent to escort the returning Flanders trade convoy. Although the Senate decided to extend his mission in early December, by mid-December he had returned with his ships to Venice and demobilized them.

=== Service in Lombardy and the councils of Venice ===
In February 1450, he was re-elected as Captain of the Gulf, but did not take up his duties, and was replaced. With a resumption of the long-standing conflict with the Duchy of Milan being imminent, in May Cappello was sent as capitano (military commander) of Brescia, and was active in restoring its fortifications and preparing its defence. In December he participated in a meeting with the other Venetian governors of the mainland at Crema, to coordinate the defence of the border towards the Adda River and the Bergamasco. In April–September 1451 he was active in repairing the fortifications of Asola, supplying Rivalta with men and ammunition, ensuring Brescia's provisions in grain and ammunition, and ensuring the regular payment of the soldiers to reduce desertions.

From October 1451 to February 1452, and again from January to June 1453, he served as one of the savii di Terraferma (commissioners on the Terraferma). In August and December 1453, he was re-elected to the post, but both times refused it, and served instead from August 1453 to February 1454 as provveditore of the Venetian Arsenal; in the troubled atmosphere following the Fall of Constantinople to the Ottomans, Cappello busied himself with rearming the Venetian fleet. A savio "recuperandi pecunias" of the same name is attested in November 1453 – May 1454 and a provveditore of the army with the same name was appointed to Brescia in February 1454, but is doubtful whether they are the same person as Cappello.

=== Embassy to the Morea ===
The Eastern Mediterranean in 1450, just before the Fall of Constantinople. Venetian possessions are in green and red. Within a decade, Ottoman dominions expanded to include the Byzantine Empire (purple) and most of the smaller Balkan states.

The news of the Fall of Constantinople caused a widespread rebellion to break out in the Despotate of the Morea among the local Albanian population against the weak rule of the brothers Thomas and Demetrios Palaiologos. The Albanians appealed to Venice and offered to submit to its rule, which the Senate initially accepted; however, as a Venetian military presence in the Morea was sure to invite Ottoman invasion, the Venetians reconsidered their options, and on 21 June 1454 Cappello was appointed as ambassador to the Morea, and tasked with restoring peace between the Despots and their Albanian subjects, as well as to examine reported violations of Venetian rights and of the Republic's territories in the Morea (Modon, Coron, and Nauplia) by Thomas Palaiologos. Venetian suspicions of Genoese naval activity in the area also led to suggestions to try to secure various port towns—Patras, Vostitsa, Glarentsa, and Corinth—for Venice, to prevent them from coming under the control of "another maritime power", but this proposal failed to pass in the Senate. Cappello arrived in Venice and began visiting the warring parties in an effort to reconcile them, but in the event, the revolt was ended through the intervention of the Ottoman warlord Turahan Bey in October 1454, who forced the Albanians to submit, and restored the feeble authority of the two Despots. The Senate was left with nothing to do but order Cappello to return to Venice, which he died in February 1455.

=== Embassy to Rome ===
Cappello is next attested on 15 September 1458, when he was selected as one of four ambassadors to the newly elected Pope Julius II. Their mission was delicate, as, aside from conveying the usual messages of congratulation, the envoys were charged with representing the Republic's positions on the location of a general congress of the Christian powers for a coordinated attack on the Ottomans, that the new Pope intended to convene. Mantua as well as Udine, a Venetian city, were proposed, but the Republic considered this as calamitous in view of its diplomatic and commercial relations with the Ottoman Empire. The ambassadors left for Rome in early November, but by that time, the Pope had already decided for Mantua. While two of the ambassadors stayed on to discuss other matters, Cappello and Triadano Gritti were recalled in late November to Venice.

In May 1459, Cappello was elected to the governatori alle Entrate (magistrates of revenue). In December and again in January 1460 he was likely – unless it was a namesake – member of the zonta of the Council of Ten convened to judge the Venetian envoys to the Congress of Mantua.

=== First tenure as Captain General of the Sea ===
On 22 February 1461, he was elected Captain General of the Sea. At the time, he was in all likelihood a member of the Council of Ten.

During his tenure, Cappello presided over a tense situation in the Aegean Sea. Following the conquest of the Despotate of the Morea in 1460, Ottoman pressure on the Venetian possessions of Modon and Coron increased, with raids being launched against them by Turkish forces in February 1461.

Nevertheless the Republic was anxious to avoid war, and his instructions were specific to that intent. Accordingly he was limited to ensuring the safety of the Venetian possessions, and that the Ottoman fleet did not leave the Dardanelles, although he was free to engage the light fusta vessels that the Turks used to conduct piracy in the Aegean. Even when the Ottomans occupied Lesbos in September 1462, Cappello, heeding his instructions, refused to answer the repeated calls for aid and observed events from Chios. The Senate sent him a letter of approbation.

Cappello did nevertheless take care to prepare for the oncoming conflict by overseeing the reinforcement of fortifications in Coron, Modon, Nauplia, Lepanto, and Negroponte, until his tenure expired in November. On his return to Venice, he brought with him the head of Saint George, which the inhabitants of the island of Aegina had given him for safe keeping.

=== Member of the College and outbreak of the First Ottoman–Venetian War ===
Shortly after his return to Venice on 13 December, Cappello became a member of the Full College, inaugurating an almost uninterrupted period of over three years where he was a member of that body and participated in the most important deliberations of the Venetian government. He served as savio grande in January–June 1463 and again in October 1463 – March 1464, then as ducal councillor from July 1464 – May 1465, and member of the Ten from September 1465.

The main issue facing the Republic during this time was the response to Ottoman expansion. A conflict was considered inevitable, but the interruption to trade it would cause was anathema to the merchant republic, and its outcome was very uncertain. Venice thus hesitated to take active steps that might provoke a war, especially since she would almost certainly be forced to fight it without the support of other Western powers. Cappello initially belonged to the more moderate faction, which advocated a policy of "armed neutrality", strengthening the fleet and Venetian fortifications overseas, but without entering into commitments with other Christian powers in the Balkans against the Ottomans.

The moderates retained the upper hand in the councils of Venice until the Ottoman capture of Argos on 3 April 1463. The event was a shock to the Venetians, and emboldened the hawkish faction, which hoped to not only check the Ottoman expansion by a determined response, but perhaps also conquer the Morea. Cappello now switched to the war faction, and became its most prominent member. When the issue of war was debated in the Senate, he delivered an impassioned speech, recorded by the Greek historian Laonikos Chalkokondyles. Cappello argued that Venetian hesitancy had only emboldened the Ottomans, and led to the loss of Constantinople, the Morea, and Bosnia; that the Ottoman Sultan, Mehmed II, was openly coveting Venetian territories; that Venice was decried in Europe for having sacrificed the eastern Christians to her commercial interests; that further passivity would lead to loss of both honour and territories; and that the only viable policy was to conclude an alliance with the Hungarians and attack the Ottomans from north and south, with Venetian forces capturing the Morea as a first step. Cappello's speech – which was also effectively the "political programme" of the war party – was instrumental in swaying its audience, and on 28 July, the Senate narrowly voted in favour of war. This was followed by an alliance with Hungary, the Pope, and the Duke of Burgundy, Philip the Good. Pope Pius II called for a crusade, a proposal Cappello supported; it was approved both in the Senate (on 8 November) and in the Great Council (on 20 November). The crusade was not popular elsewhere in Italy, however, since the other Italian states feared that any benefits would accrue mostly to Venice, whose hegemonic designs they feared. Eventually, however, the crusade never got off the ground due to the reluctance of the Doge of Venice, Cristoforo Moro, to sail from Venice. Despite mounting dissatisfaction in Venice, the Doge tried to be exempted on account of his age, but was forced to go by Cappello, who argued that the "well-being and honour of this land" superseded the Doge's own. By the time the Doge's fleet arrived at Ancona to meet with the Pope, however, Pius II was ill from the plague, and died three days later, on 15 August, ending any designs for a crusade.

Cappello favoured a decisive campaign in the Morea, and in the early months of the war, he seemed to get his wish; the Venetian forces retook Argos and refortified the Isthmus of Corinth, restoring the Hexamilion wall and equipping it with many cannons. They then proceeded to besiege the fortress of the Acrocorinth, which controlled the northwestern Morea, but after a clash that killed the commander-in-chief, Bertoldo d'Este, on 20 October, the Venetians were then forced to lift the siege and retreat to the Hexamilion. After a while, demoralized and riddled with dysentery, the Venetians abandoned that position too and withdrew to Nauplia, allowing Ottoman reinforcements under Mahmud Pasha Angelović to enter the Morea unimpeded. In February, Cappello argued for the appointment of Sigismondo Pandolfo Malatesta as the new commander-in-chief, but his tenure, which lasted through 1465, was ineffective, mostly due to the limited resources and manpower made available to him. The Venetian government, which had entered the war only with great reluctance, did not show great commitment in pursuing the war, and Cappello was unable to effect any change in its stance.

On 5 September 1464, as ducal councillor, Cappello was elected as one of the ten envoys to the new pope, Paul II. The embassy was tasked with discussing the ongoing war, papal financial aid to Venice and Hungary, papal intervention with the Italian states hostile to Venice, and the exploitation of the alum mines of Tolfa, whose proceeds Paul II intended to use to finance the crusade. Cappello returned to his home town in December 1464. In September 1465 he was elected a member of the Ten.

=== Second tenure as Captain General and death ===
In the meantime, the Venetian war effort was faltering. Two attacks on Mytilene in 1464 failed, and the Captain General of the Sea, Jacopo Loredan, spent the remainder of his time in ultimately fruitless demonstrations of force before the Dardanelles, and with a diplomatic confrontation, that nearly led to war, with the Knights Hospitaller of Rhodes. Loredan repeatedly asked to be replaced, but it was not until February 1466 that Vettore Cappello was elected for the second time as Captain General of the Sea. Cappello's appointment brought elation and renewed hope for a decisive turn in the war; the provveditore of the Venetian army in the Morea, Giacomo Barbarigo, expressed "utmost joy" at the news, and the distinguished statesman Andrea Diedo expressed the expectation that Cappello would lead the recovery of the Hexamilion and the conquest of Corinth.

Cappello left Venice in April, with instructions that gave him ample freedom in his conduct of the war. He took over command of the fleet at Sapienza, and sailed to Modon, Lepanto, and Negroponte to strengthen their fortifications. At Negroponte he forbade the continuing commerce with the Turks, but the Senate soon revoked his decision. Cappello then took his fleet of 25 galleys to the northern Aegean, capturing the islands of Imbros, Thasos and Samothrace. From there he sailed south again, with 28 ships, and on 12 July landed at Piraeus and marched against Athens, the Ottomans' major regional base. The lower town was taken without serious resistance, but he failed to take the Acropolis of Athens. As a result, in early August he abandoned the enterprise and resolved to march to Patras in the northwestern Morea. The town of Patras had been placed under siege by the Venetians under the provveditore Barbarigo, and was about to fall. Cappello nevertheless came too late: a few days before his arrival, Turahanoğlu Ömer Bey with 12,000 horsemen attacked the Venetian forces at Patras and routed them, killing Barbarigo. When Cappello arrived, he tried to avenge the defeat, but was in turn repulsed with heavy losses. Cappello gathered the remnants of his army and returned to Negroponte.

In the meantime, the Senate resolved to recommence peace negotiations with the Sultan, and selected the Captain of the Gulf, Antonio Michiel, for the mission; instructions were sent to Cappello in November to be passed on to Michiel or any other of the captains to replace him. Michiel's mission was doomed to fail, as Sultan Mehmed II was not interested in peace, but the conflict nevertheless died down for several months. In the meantime, Cappello had fallen severely ill. His failure at Patras severely demoralized him—Marino Sanudo reports that he never smiled thereafter—and he died of cardiac arrest at Negroponte on 13 March 1467.

His body was returned to Venice, where his sons, Alvise, Andrea, and Paolo, buried him in the church of Sant'Elena, and dedicated a funeral monument in the façade of the church that shows him kneeling before the patron saint, Saint Helena. Variously attributed to the sculptors Antonio Rizzo or Antonio Dentone, it was the first, and for almost a century only, monument of this kind in Venice.

== Notes ==
a: At this time, Venice had no standing fleet. Every winter, the standing committees of the Great Council of Venice established the annual orders for the so-called "guard fleet", or "fleet of the Gulf". The Great Council then voted on the proposals, the size of the fleet, and the appointment of a Captain of the Gulf and the galley captains (sopracomiti) for the galleys to be outfitted in Venice. The commanders of the galleys equipped by Venetian colonies were decided by the local colonists.

== Sources ==
- Giannasi, Laura (1975). "CAPPELLO, Vettore". Dizionario Biografico degli Italiani (in Italian). Vol. 18: Canella–Cappello. Rome: Istituto dell'Enciclopedia Italiana. ISBN 978-88-12-00032-6.
- Martin, Thomas (1998). Alessandro Vittoria and the Portrait Bust in Renaissance Venice: Remodelling Antiquity. Clarendon Press. ISBN 978-0-198174172.
- Setton, Kenneth M. (1978). The Papacy and the Levant (1204–1571), Volume II: The Fifteenth Century. Vol. 2. Philadelphia: The American Philosophical Society. ISBN 0-87169-127-2.
- Stahl, Alan M. (2009). "Michael of Rhodes: Mariner in Service to Venice". In Long, Pamela O. (ed.). The Book of Michael of Rhodes: A Fifteenth-Century Maritime Manuscript. Volume III: Studies. Cambridge, Massachusetts: MIT Press. pp. 35–98. ISBN 978-0-262-12308-2.
