= Battle of Erzincan =

Battle of Erzincan may refer to:

- Battle of Erzincan (1473) between Ottomans and Aq Qoyunlu
- Battle of Erzincan (1507) between Ottomans and Safavids
- Battle of Erzincan (1916) between Ottomans and Russians in World War I
