= Battle of Patras (1466) =

- Part of the Ottoman–Venetian War (1463–1479)
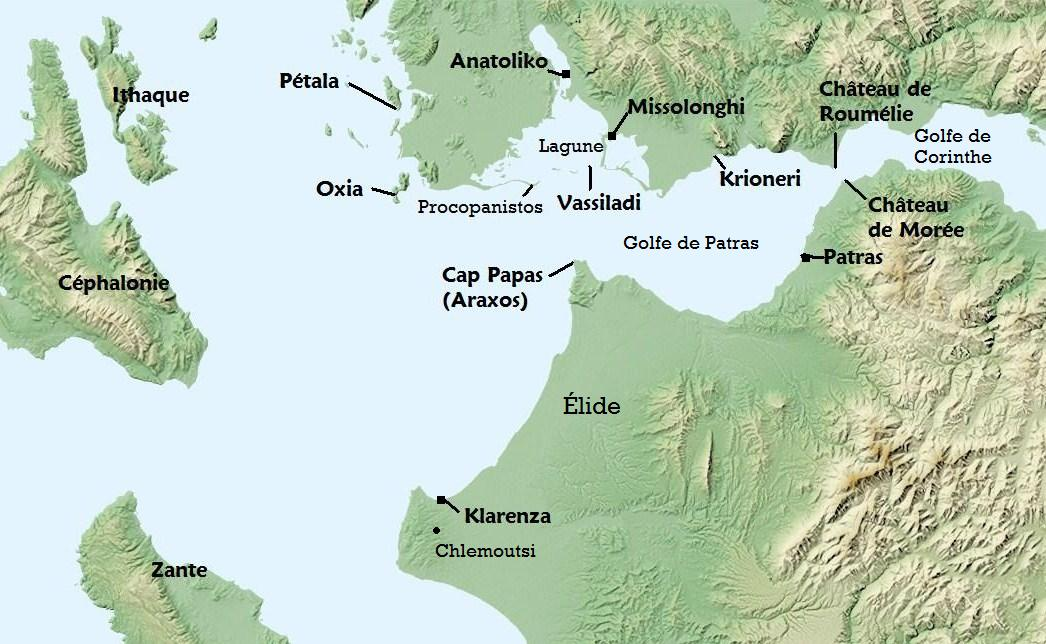
- Gulf of Patras
Date	Early August 1466
Location	Patras
Result	Ottoman victory

Belligerents
Ottoman Empire	Republic of Venice

Commanders and leaders
Turahanoğlu Ömer Bey	Iacopo Barbarigo †; Vettore Cappello

Strength
12,000 cavalry	First battle: 2,000 men Second battle: Unknown

Casualties and losses
Unknown	First battle: 600 killed 100 prisoners Second battle: 1,200 killed

The Battle of Patras was a military engagement between the Venetian army and the Ottomans. The Ottomans emerged victorious, defeating two Venetian armies in Patras.

== Background ==
In late April 1466, Vettore Cappello, the champion and advocate of war against the Ottomans, replaced Iacopo Lorendano from his post as captain-general of the sea. He set sail with 25 galleys, resuming naval activities. Cappello managed to take the islands of Imbros, Thasos, and Samothrace from the Ottomans, he also undertook a successful raid against Athens but failed to dislodge the Ottomans enough. Despite these victories, they proved indecisive to change the war's course. The Venetians on land situation was a lot worse.

== Battle ==
In August 1466, Iacopo Barbarigo, the Provveditore of Morea, took over the command of land forces after Sigismondo Pandolfo Malatesta departure. Barbarigo had a force of 2,000 men. The Venetians attacked the city of Patras. They bombarded the walls heavily and soon were to collapse. Almost at their success, the Ottoman general, Turahanoğlu Ömer Bey, suddenly appeared with a force of 12,000 cavalry. His unexpected arrival drove the Venetians into the sea, many of them drowned and the ships who transported the Venetians were powerless. In the following massacre, 600 Venetians were killed and 100 were taken prisoners. Barbarigo was captured, taken to Patras, and executed. The prisoners were taken to Istanbul and executed.

Cappello learned the news of this defeat and arrived a few days later in Patras. Wishing to avenge the Venetian defeat, Cappelo landed his forces and attacked Ömer Bey. The following bloody battle ended with Ottoman victory and the rout of the Venetians, allegedly losing 1,200 men. Cappello barely escaped from the battle and headed to Chalcis. Cappello would die disheartened in March 1467.

== Sources ==
- Babinger, Franz (1992) [1978]. Mehmed the Conqueror and His Time. Bollingen Series 96. Translated from the German by Ralph Manheim. Edited, with a preface, by William C. Hickman. Princeton, New Jersey: Princeton University Press. ISBN 0-691-09900-6.
- Setton, Kenneth M. (1978). The Papacy and the Levant (1204–1571), Volume II: The Fifteenth Century. Vol. 2. Philadelphia: The American Philosophical Society. ISBN 0-87169-127-2.
