= Isa Bey Ishaković =

15th century Bosnian nobleman, Ottoman general and governor of Bosnia

- İshakoğlu İsa Bey
- Born: Hranić
- Relatives: Kosača or Pavlović
- Military career
- Allegiance: Ottoman Empire
- Service years: 15th century
- Rank: sanjak-bey (provincial governor)

Isa Bey Ishaković (Turkish: İshakoğlu İsa Bey, Serbo-Croatian: Isa-beg Ishaković; fl. 1439–70) was an Ottoman general and the governor of the Sanjak of Bosnia for most of his career. Of Bosnian noble origin, he was recruited after being held hostage by the Ottomans. He was a provincial governor during the 1450s and 1460s, first in charge of the Sanjak of Skopje, and then the Sanjak of Bosnia. He was instrumental in the Ottoman conquests in the region, and was one of the Sultan's most trusted generals.

== Origin ==
There are two main theories about his father’s identity:

- Ishak Hranić Kosača, the brother of Bosnian nobleman Stjepan Vukčić Kosača, who was sent to the sultan Mehmed II as hostage guarantee of Kosača's loyalty. After being adopted by Pasha Jigit Bey he was converted into Islam and had by contemporary measures a significant military and political career within the Ottoman Empire. His patronymic Hranić indicates that his father's name was Hrana, which means that he was not Stjepan's brother but that Ishak Bey Hranić was Sandalj Hranić's brother.
- Ishak Hranić/Hranušić, taken prisoner when the akinci intruded a holding of the Pavlović noble family (lords of eastern Bosnia, including the župa of Vrhbosna). He proved himself exceptionally able while a prisoner, so the akinci leader freed him (prompted him to leave the property, as well as his title).

== Career ==
Isa Bey conquered Hodidjed fortress in 1435, after it had been briefly reconquered by Matko Talovac in 1434.

Isa Bey was appointed as sanjak-bey (provincial governor) of the Sanjak of Skopje in the spring of 1439, in place of his father, Ishak Bey, who was sent to lead military actions in Serbia.

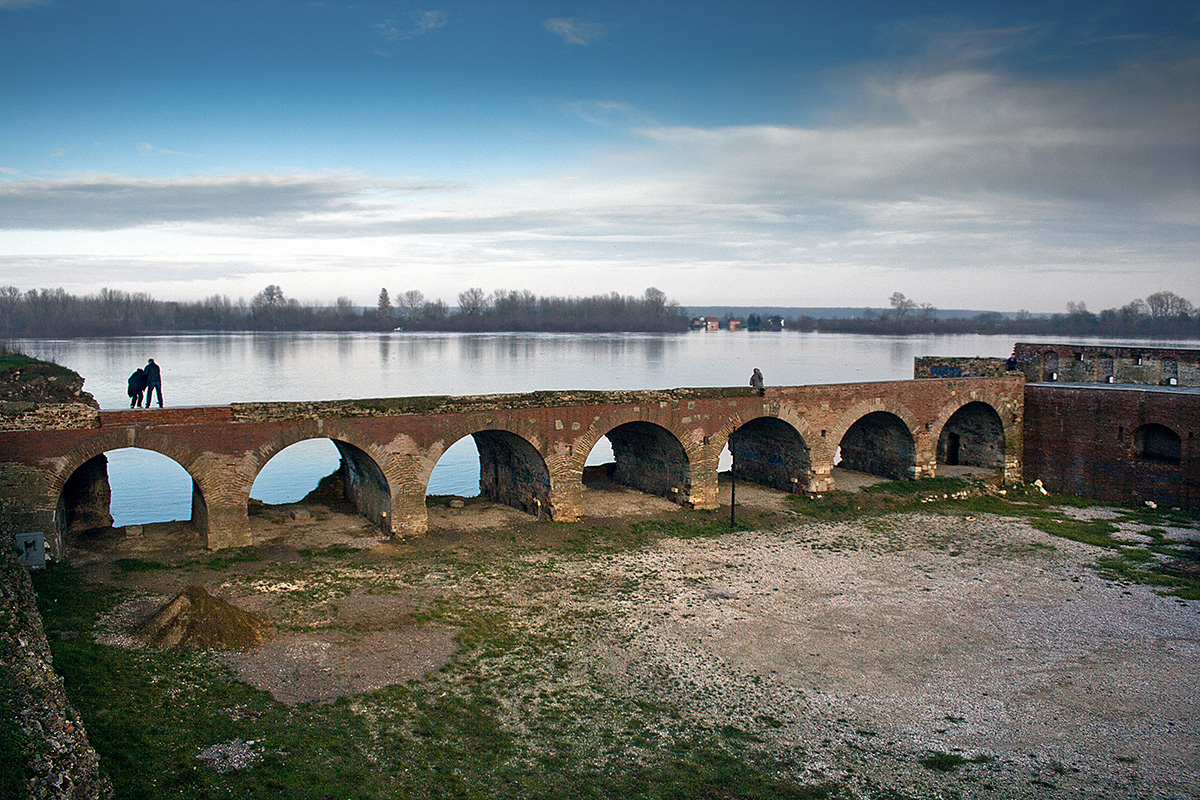
Šabac Fortress, founded by Ishaković

Isa Bey was appointed governor of Bosnia in 1463/64. He founded Sarajevo in 1463 in the former Bosnian province of Vrhbosna, beginning with building the core of the city's Old Town district, including a mosque, a closed marketplace, a public bath, a hostel, and the Governor's castle (Saray), which gave the city its present name. In much the same way and year he also founded Novi Pazar (in Serbia), rendered from Turkish: Yeni Pazar, literally meaning "new marketplace", some eleven kilometers from the medieval settlement of Trgovište ("Trgovište" means "marketplace"). There he built a mosque, a marketplace, a public bath, a hostel, and a compound. He is also responsible for establishing a number of other cities and towns in the region. Ishaković built many important buildings part of the Old Bazaar in Skopje, like the Čifte Hammam, Kapan Han, Ishak Bey Mosque (dedicated to his father Ishak Bey, also known as Isaklija or Aladža), the madrasa (Islamic school) and library (within Ishak Bey's Mosque, one of the first Islamic libraries in Europe), and many other buildings that belonged to his endowment (waqf, Bosnian: vakuf).

Isa Bey participated in ransom slavery in 1470 when he ransomed a highly positioned Ottoman official named Mustafa by releasing the wife of Croatian nobleman Ivan Marković and paying 500 ducats to Ragusan Frančesko Micalović, the agent in this transaction.

== Family tree ==
Per Franz Babinger in the Encyclopedia of Islam:

Pasha Yiğit Bey
Ishak Bey	Turahan Bey
Isa Bey Ishaković	Ahmed Bey	Ömer Bey
Hasan Bey	Idris Bey

Per Amir Isajbegovic in the Kuca onih sto sade dud - Rekonstrukcija:

== Annotations ==
- Name: He is referred to as Isa-Beg Ishaković in Bosnian sources. Some sources spell his patronymic "Isaković". Based on his possible origins, he may be referred to as Isa-beg Ishaković Hranić or Isa-beg Ishaković Hranušić.
