= Alvise Loredan =

15th-century Venetian nobleman and captain

- Born: 1393
- Died: 6 March 1466 (aged 72–73)
- Buried: Church of Santa Maria dei Servi
- Noble family: House of Loredan
- Spouses: Andriola Negrobon, Isabella Cocco
- Issue: Giovanni, Francesco, Nicolò, Marco
- Father: Giovanni Loredan, Duke of Candia

Alvise Loredan (1393 – 6 March 1466) was a Venetian nobleman of the Loredan family. At a young age he became a galley captain, and served with distinction as a military commander, with a long record of battles against the Ottomans, from the naval expeditions to aid Thessalonica, to the Crusade of Varna, and the opening stages of the Ottoman–Venetian War of 1463–1479, as well as the Wars in Lombardy against the Duchy of Milan. He also served in a number of high government positions, as provincial governor, savio del consiglio, and Procuratore de Supra of Saint Mark's Basilica.

== Early life ==
Alvise Loredan was born in 1393 in the parish of St. Canciano in Venice, the only son of Giovanni Loredan (Duke of Candia), son of the Procurator of St Mark's Alvise Loredan. The name and origin of his mother are unknown. At the age of 21 he married Andriola, daughter of the merchant Cristoforo Negrobon, who, although wealthy, was apparently not a member of the patriciate, the upper stratum of the Venetian aristocracy. This marriage involved Loredan in commercial activities, but without much success; the death of his father in 1420, while he was away as duke (governor) of Crete, forced Loredan to assume the leadership of his household, and by 1423 Alvise had entered the service of the Republic as sopracomito (captain) in one of the war galleys, although in September of that year he was allowed to lay aside that duty due to a grave illness.

== Service during the defence of Thessalonica ==
In 1425 he appears again as sopracomito in the fleet under the command of Fantino Michiel, during the operations in defence of Thessalonica against the Ottoman Empire. In July 1425, Michiel led ten galleys east from the city: the Venetians raided Ierissos and other forts in its vicinity, and then onto Christopolis (modern Kavala). The Venetians found the castle held by a 400-strong force of Ottoman sipahis, under the command of a certain Ismail Bey. Loredan led the first attack, which was repulsed, and only after all the ships mustered their forces were the Venetians able to overcome Ottoman resistance in a four-hour long battle: 41 Turks were killed, including Ismail Bey, and 30 taken prisoner. The Venetians occupied the fortress, but their success was temporary, as the Turks soon returned with a larger force and stormed the castle, killing or taking prisoner its Venetian garrison.

Loredan remained active in the area, for on 22 February 1429, an act of the Great Council of Venice named him as captain of a large cog, equipped with towers, that was to be sent to Thessalonica. Loredan and his ship was assigned a major role in the attack by the Captain general of the Sea Andrea Mocenigo against the Ottoman naval base at Gallipoli on 1 July: his great ship would approach the Ottoman fortifications and engage the garrison with crossbows at close range, while the rest of the fleet broke through the palisade protecting the harbour and attacked the Ottoman ships moored there. In the event, although Mocenigo with his flagship managed to break into the palisade, the other Venetian vessels did not follow, forcing Mocenigo to withdraw with heavy casualties.

Loredan captained a ship in next year's fleet as well. The fleet left Venice on 5 March, but a few weeks later, while still under way, learned of the fall of Thessalonica to the Ottomans (29 March). Captain general Silvestro Morosini decided to avenge the city's fall by attacking an Ottoman fortress in the Dardanelles. The fort was largely destroyed after being bombarded by the fleet from 6 to 16 June; much of the work was done by Loredan's ship, which was specially equipped with large artillery pieces. Nevertheless, on 4 September, the Venetians concluded a peace treaty with the Ottomans.

== Military and civil service in Lombardy and overseas ==
In 1431, the third war against the Duchy of Milan, ruled by the ambitious Filippo Maria Visconti, began. On 19 May, Loredan was elected captain of the squadron sent to harass Genoese shipping in the waters of the Levant. In this capacity, Loredan executed a landing against the Genoese colony of Chios. On 27 January 1432, he was elected as a sopracomito in the Tyrrhenian Sea fleet, and thus came under the command of his uncle, the celebrated admiral Pietro Loredan. In 1433–34, he assumed his first civil post as podestà (governor) and captain of Belluno. In 1435, he was elected as captain of the muda (trade convoy) to "Romania" (the lands of the Byzantine Empire and the Black Sea).

From December 1436 to September 1438 he was provveditore (commissioner, charged with both civil and military affairs) at Bergamo. His tenure coincided with the start of the fourth war against Milan, and the Visconti offensive under Niccolò Piccinino in Lombardy; in the event, however, Piccinino turned towards Brescia rather than Bergamo.

At around this time his first wife, with whom he had two sons, Francesco and Giovanni, died, and in 1441, Lordan married Isabella Cocco di Nicolò, herself a widow from a first marriage to Benedetto Foscarini. They had another two sons, Marco and Nicolò. In the same year, Loredan became head of the sestiere of Dorsoduro, after moving his residence from his family's traditional parish of St. Canciano to the island of Giudecca.

The Loredans were proponents of Venice's traditional, maritime orientation, and viewed with distrust its expansion on the Italian mainland (the Terraferma), which had brought it into conflict with Milan. Alvise Loredan shared this view, as can be seen from a proposal he brought before the Great Council in February 1442, ordering the governors of Bergamo to demolish its fortifications as a sign of goodwill and trust towards Visconti, following the conclusion of peace with Milan at the Treaty of Cremona. The proposal failed to pass; nevertheless he was voted as admiral of the Gulf for the year. Throughout the summer and autumn of 1442 he led operations against Aragonese corsairs in the waters off Albania and southern Italy, as well as subduing the towns of Zenta (now a suburb of Split) and Budva. On 3 February 1443, Loredan was elected as Procurator of St Mark's de Supra (in charge of the cathedral itself), but allowed to continue to reside in Giudecca in exchange for an annual rent of 70 ducats.

== Crusade of Varna ==
At the same time, he was elected as Captain general of the Sea, as part of the anti-Ottoman crusade being organized by King Ladislaus III of Poland and Hungary and John Hunyadi; however, the Venetians did not engage in any serious activity for the year, and on 11 November 1443, Loredan instead was appointed as one of the savii alle acque (officials charged with supervising the waterways of the Venetian Lagoon). On 25 April 1444, Loredan was appointed commander of the Venetian and Papal squadrons that would sail to take part in the crusade. His instructions, received on 17 June, were to obstruct the Ottoman Sultan, Murad II, from crossing with his army into Anatolia and moving against the Karamanid ruler Ibrahim, who was allied with the Christian league. In the event, Loredan reached the Turkish Straits too late to stop Murad. As the Christian offensive in the Balkans was delayed, on 9 September he received instructions from Venice to abstain from offensive actions and open secret negotiations with the Sultan, who in the meantime defeated the Karamanids. Once the Crusader army began its invasion, however, he was charged with hindering the Ottoman army from returning to Europe. Loredan blockaded the Dardanelles, but Murad chose to cross the Bosporus north of Constantinople. As a result, on 11 November, at the Battle of Varna, the Ottomans inflicted a crushing defeat on the Crusader army. While Venice negotiated for a peace with the Sultan, Loredan spent the next year cruising with his fleet in the Aegean, in order to protect Venice's possessions and allies from Ottoman reprisals.

== Later career ==
In late 1445, Loredan returned to Venice to disband his fleet. In October 1446, he became a savio del consiglio, and on 28 November he became a member of the zonta (extraordinary adjuncts) of the Council of Ten on the issue of Jacopo Foscari, the son of Doge Francesco Foscari: he was allowed to return from exile to Nauplia in Greece to Zelarino, in close proximity to Venice. On 23 February 1447 he was elected provveditore in campo (commissioner to the captain general of the army) for the new war against Milan, but declined to take p the post on account of ill health. On 17 March, he went to Rome as part of an embassy to congratulate the new Pope, Nicholas V. After his return, he was again elected provveditore in campo on 25 August, in order to assist his colleague Gherardo Dandolo. He accepted, but his poor health continued, and on 14 November he returned to Venice. Following the Milanese victory at the Battle of Caravaggio, on 8 November 1448 he was elected ambassador, along with Pasquale Malipiero, to the Milanese commander, Francesco Sforza, with whom Venice made a pact: in exchange for promising him rule over Milan, Sforza allied himself with Venice. After a brief period as provveditore in campo of Brescia, Loredan returned to Venice, where on 6 February 1449 he became a member of a zonta convened to try some Paduan rebels. In July, after he was once more elected as Captain general of the Sea in the war launched by Alfonso V of Aragon, who as King of Naples claimed the Ionian Islands, a Venetian dominion. Loredan led a fleet of 35 galleys to raid Messina and the coasts of Sicily, and scored a major success when he forced entry into the harbour of Syracuse, and destroyed the ships he found there. He returned to Venice in November 1449, when he was elected as one of the commissioners of salt (provveditori al Sale). The conflict ended on 2 July 1450 by a compromise peace.

Loredan reappears in August 1453, as provveditore of the Venetian Arsenal; following the Fall of Constantinople, he and his colleague Vettore Cappello were charged with constructing new war galleys. In October he was again elected savio del consiglio until March 1454, and again in October 1454 until March 1455. In this capacity he was sent to Bartolomeo Colleoni to offer him the post of captain general of the Venetian armies, but with a reduced salary (condotta) on account of the prevailing peaceful conditions. During the following years, he was almost continuously among the savi del consiglio. In April 1457 he received permission to leave the city for four months on account of the plague. In October 1458, he argued against the Pope's proposal to hold a general meeting of Christian princes at Udine for the purpose of preparing another anti-Ottoman crusade. In December 1460 he was charged with investigating the sentences passed by the Auditori alle Sentenze. In January 1461 he was again one of the salt commissioners.

== First Ottoman–Venetian War and death ==
On 4 February 1463, while serving again as a savio del consiglio, Loredan was elected as Captain general of the Sea in the conflict with the Ottomans in the Morea. As the Venetians hoped to contain the conflict, his initial orders were marked by caution: he was to patrol the Aegean and defend any Venetian territories, but limit offensive actions to at most capturing Genoese ships. Following the Ottoman capture of Argos on 3 April, however, the situation changed, and Venice declared war on the Ottomans. Between June and August, Loredan landed an army under the Marquis Bertoldo d'Este off Modon and Nauplia. The campaign initially made rapid gains: Argos was recaptured in early August, and the Venetians refortified the Isthmus of Corinth, restoring the Hexamilion wall and equipping it with many cannons. They then proceeded to besiege the fortress of the Acrocorinth, which controlled the northwestern Morea. The Venetians engaged in repeated clashes with the defenders and with the relief army under Turahanoğlu Ömer Bey, until they suffered a major defeat on 20 October, which resulted in the wounding and subsequent death of d'Este. The Venetians were then forced to lift the siege and retreat to the Hexamilion. Following the arrival of substantial Ottoman reinforcements under the Grand Vizier Mahmud Pasha Angelović the Venetians, whose army had been depleted by dysentery, abandoned the Hexamilion without a fight and retreated to their coastal fortresses. The Ottomans razed the wall yet again and advanced into the Morea. Argos surrendered and was razed, and several forts and localities that had recognized Venetian authority reverted to their Ottoman allegiance.

After the Venetian retreat, Loredan attempted to gain an advantage for Venice by capturing Lemnos, and then brought the fleet of anchor at the colony of Negroponte. Loredan requested to be repatriated, whereupon the Senate elected Orsotto Giustinian as his successor. The transfer of authority took place at Modon on 28 February 1464, and Loredan returned home. On 5 September he was elected as envoy to congratulate the new Pope, Paul II (a Venetian), but he refused to accept; the government allowed him to postpone the embassy until the next spring, but in the end, they chose another to replace him.

On 4 September 1465 he was again, for the fourth time, elected as Captain general of the Sea, in the ongoing war with the Ottomans. Despite his poor health he accepted, but soon his situation deteriorated to such an extent that on 7 February 1466 Vettore Cappello was elected to replace him. Loredan died in Venice on 6 March, and was buried in the Church of Santa Maria dei Servi, Venice.

== Notes ==
a: At this time, Venice had no standing fleet. Every winter, the standing committees of the Great Council of Venice established the annual orders for the so-called "guard fleet", or "fleet of the Gulf [the Adriatic Sea]". The Great Council then voted on the proposals, the size of the fleet, and the appointment of a Captain of the Gulf and the galley captains (sopracomiti) for the galleys to be outfitted in Venice. The commanders of the galleys equipped by Venetian colonies were decided by the local colonists.

== Sources ==
- Babinger, Franz (1992) [1978]. Mehmed the Conqueror and His Time. Bollingen Series 96. Translated from the German by Ralph Manheim. Edited, with a preface, by William C. Hickman. Princeton, New Jersey: Princeton University Press. ISBN 0-691-09900-6.
- Gulino, Giuseppe (2005). "LOREDAN, Alvise". Dizionario Biografico degli Italiani (in Italian). Vol. 65: Levis–Lorenzetti. Rome: Institute of the Italian Encyclopaedia. ISBN 978-88-12-00032-6.
- Mertzios, Konstantinos (2007) [1949]. Μνημεία Μακεδονικής Ιστορίας [Monuments of Macedonian History] (PDF) (in Greek) (Second ed.). Thessaloniki: Society for Macedonian Studies. ISBN 978-960-7265-78-4.
- Romano, Dennis (2007). The Likeness of Venice: A Life of Doge Francesco Foscari. Yale University Press. ISBN 978-0-300-11202-3.
- Setton, Kenneth M. (1978). The Papacy and the Levant (1204–1571), Volume II: The Fifteenth Century. Vol. 2. Philadelphia: The American Philosophical Society. ISBN 0-87169-127-2.
- Stahl, Alan M. (2009). "Michael of Rhodes: Mariner in Service to Venice". In Long, Pamela O. (ed.). The Book of Michael of Rhodes: A Fifteenth-Century Maritime Manuscript. Volume III: Studies. Cambridge, Massachusetts: MIT Press. pp. 35–98. ISBN 978-0-262-12308-2.
- Vacalopoulos, Apostolos E. (1973). History of Macedonia 1354–1833. Translated by Peter Megann. Thessaloniki: Institute for Balkan Studies. Archived from the original on 2016-04-23.
