= Second Battle of Corinth order of battle =

The order of battle for the Second Battle of Corinth, or in the context of the American Civil War, simply the Battle of Corinth, includes:

- Second Battle of Corinth order of battle: Confederate
- Second Battle of Corinth order of battle: Union

== See also ==
- Siege of Corinth order of battle, for the First Battle of Corinth
- Battle of Corinth (disambiguation)
