= Gazi Omer Bey Mosque =

Former mosque in Livadeia, Greece

- Τζαμί του Γαζή Ομέρ Μπέη
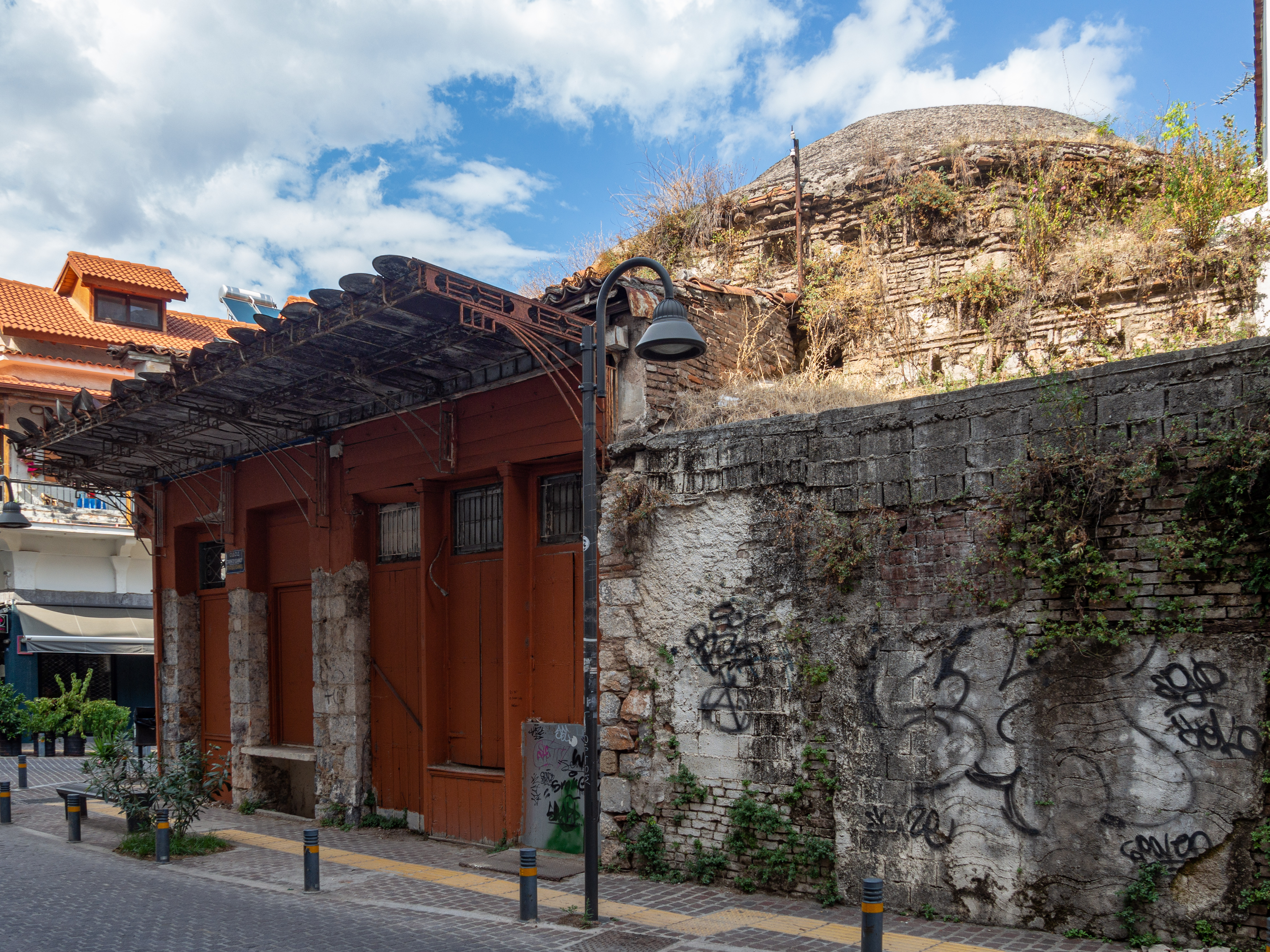
- The former mosque

- Location of the former mosque in Greece

Religion
- Affiliation: Islam (former)
- Ecclesiastical or organizational status: Mosque (16th century–1820s)
- Status: Abandoned (as a mosque)

Location
- Location: Livadeia, Boeotia, Central Greece
- Country: Greece
- Interactive map of Gazi Omer Bey Mosque
- Coordinates: 38°26′07″N 22°52′29″E

Architecture
- Type: Mosque
- Style: Ottoman
- Founder: Omer Bey
- Completed: Late 1500s

Specifications
- Dome: 1
- Minaret: 1 (destroyed)
- Materials: Stone; brick

The Gazi Omer Bey Mosque (Greek: Τζαμί του Γαζή Ομέρ Μπέη, from Turkish: Gazi Ömer Bey Camii) is a former mosque in the town of Livadeia, Boeotia, in the Central region of Greece. It was built in the commercial center and the most densely populated district of the town. Built in the late 16th century, during the Ottoman era, the former mosque was abandoned in the 1820s. In the 21st century, there have been plans to renovate it and repurpose use for cultural activities.

== History ==
Livadeia was conquered by Omer Bey in 1460, during the reign of Sultan Mehmed II, and the mosque was named after him when it was erected during the second halve of the fifteenth century. It is the only surviving of the three Ottoman mosques in Livadeia, and only in part. It was built in the most populous district and commercial center of the town, named Omer Bey, where the Muslim community of the town dwelled.

Following the Greek War of Independence (1821–1829), the mosque became property of the newly founded Greek state. It was left neglected to decay for centuries until in 2015 when the municipality of Livadeia decided the buy the building, with the purchase finalised in 2016, for €200,000, with the aim to restore it and use it for cultural and tourist purposes. It has been declared a preserved monument.

== Architecture ==
The mosque is partially preserved. What remains is the main prayer room, a square hall covered with a dome, while newer elements have been added on the outside that have altered the volume and form of the original building. Only its dome is clearly visible through all the other structures obstructing its view.

== See also ==
- Islam in Greece
- List of former mosques in Greece
- Ottoman Greece
