= Nikephoros Loukanes =

15th-century Byzantine aristocrat

Nikephoros Loukanes (Greek: Νικηφόρος Λουκάνης) was a Byzantine aristocrat active in the Despotate of the Morea in the 1450s.

== Life ==
Nikephoros Loukanes was of noble descent, but little is known about his early life. He is first mentioned during the Morea revolt of 1453–1454, as being imprisoned by the Despot of the Morea, Thomas Palaiologos, due to his sympathies with the Albanian rebels and for favouring a passive stance towards the Ottoman Empire. He came free with the aid of Albanian rebels, but was recaptured by the Despot Thomas and imprisoned in Mystras, the capital of the Despotate of the Morea.

In 1454/5 he founded a chapel dedicated to Christ the Saviour in Mystras. He fought against Matthew Palaiologos Asen, but later governed the fortress of the Acrocorinth together with him. From 15 May 1458 he held out in the Acrocorinth against the forces of Sultan Mehmed II during the latter's invasion of the Morea, until he and Matthew Asen capitulated and surrendered the fortress on 6 August of the same year.

In 1459 he counselled Thomas Palaiologos to rise up against the Ottomans, which led to the final destruction of the Despotate and his own death in 1459 or 1460.

== Sources ==
- Trapp, Erich; Beyer, Hans-Veit; Walther, Rainer; Sturm-Schnabl, Katja; Kislinger, Ewald; Leontiadis, Ioannis; Kaplaneres, Sokrates (1976–1996). Prosopographisches Lexikon der Palaiologenzeit (in German). Vienna: Verlag der Österreichischen Akademie der Wissenschaften. ISBN 3-7001-3003-1.
- Vakalopoulos, Apostolos E. (1974). Ιστορία του νέου ελληνισμού, Τόμος Α′: Αρχές και διαμόρφωσή του (Έκδοση Β′) [History of modern Hellenism, Volume I: Its origins and formation] (in Greek) (2nd ed.). Thessaloniki: Emm. Sfakianakis & Sons.
