= Siege of Corinth (1463) =

Coordinates: 37°53′26″N 22°52′21″E

- Part of the Ottoman–Venetian War (1463–1479)
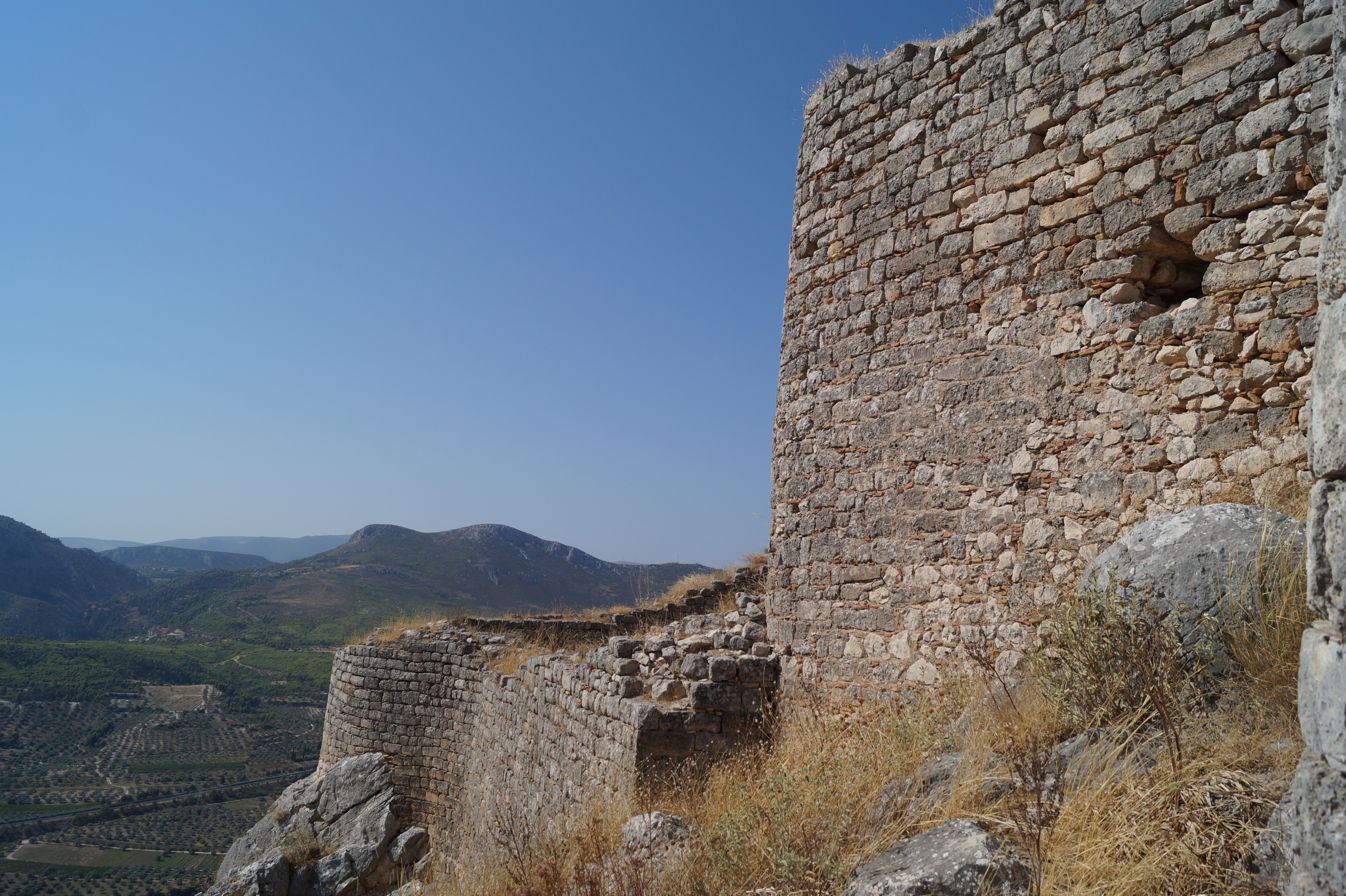
- Walls of Corinth
Date	September 3 – October 20, 1463
Location	Corinth, Morea, Greece
Result	Ottoman victory

Belligerents
Ottoman Empire	Republic of Venice

Commanders and leaders
Elvanoğlu Sinan Beg; Mahmud Angelović; Turahanoğlu Ömer	Bertoldo d’Este †; Alvise Loredan

Strength
60 men	Thousands of soldiers, 32 galleys and many ships

The Siege of Corinth was a battle took place during the Venetians' attack on the Morea, which was under Ottoman control.

== Background ==
The Venetians began their campaign toward the Morea in a far more magnificent manner. In May of 1463, thousands of warriors under the command of the Condottiere Bertoldo d’Este were embarked on ships commanded by Alvise Loredan. Loredan himself commanded 32 galleys and many other vessels. Venice had rarely assembled such a large fleet.

== Battle ==
When the Venetians recaptured the fortress of Argos on 12 August 1463, the first battle of the war had taken place. On 3 September, the Venetian army under Bertoldo’s command attacked the fortress of Corinth. As Bertoldo was bombarding the fortress with artillery and was close to bringing down the walls, the fortress commander, Elvanoğlu Sinan Bey, having lost hope in the walls, planned to launch a sortie and conduct a night raid against the Venetians. On a very dark night, Sinan Bey suddenly attacked the Venetians with a force of 60 men. The Venetian army, not expecting such a sortie from troops besieged inside the fortress, could not make sense of the situation and assumed that the attackers were the relief army under Grand Vizier Mahmud Pasha. Mistaking Sinan Bey’s force for Mahmud Pasha’s army, the Venetians began to fall into disorder and flee. When Sinan Bey learned that Sultan Mehmed II had also sent him an additional force commanded by Turahanoğlu Ömer Bey as reinforcements, he intensified his attack even further. During this clash, Bertoldo d’Este received fatal wounds and died (20 October). The other relief army under the command of Mahmud Pasha forced the Venetians to lift the siege and flee to Loredan’s ships. The Turkish army commanded by Mahmud Pasha broke through the Hexamilion, recaptured Argos, and advanced into the heart of the Morea before winter set in. Alvise Loredan, meanwhile, was left with his fleet in a state of complete helplessness in the waters of the Isthmus Strait.

== Aftermath ==
Mahmud Pasha marched upon the other Greek cities that had rebelled and captured these fortresses one by one. Almost every stronghold that had shown willingness to side with the Venetians submitted to the Turks. The main Ottoman army entered Leontari without any battle. Turahanoğlu Ömer Bey launched raids into Venetian-held territories and seized the fortresses of Methoni and Koron. He even forced the Albanians in the mountains to surrender. Had winter not arrived, the Turkish successes would undoubtedly have continued. The Venetians’ achievements had vanished, and the Christian offensive had turned into a complete disaster.
