= Battle of Corinth (1458) =

Ottoman victory in Greece

- Part of the Ottoman conquest of the Morea
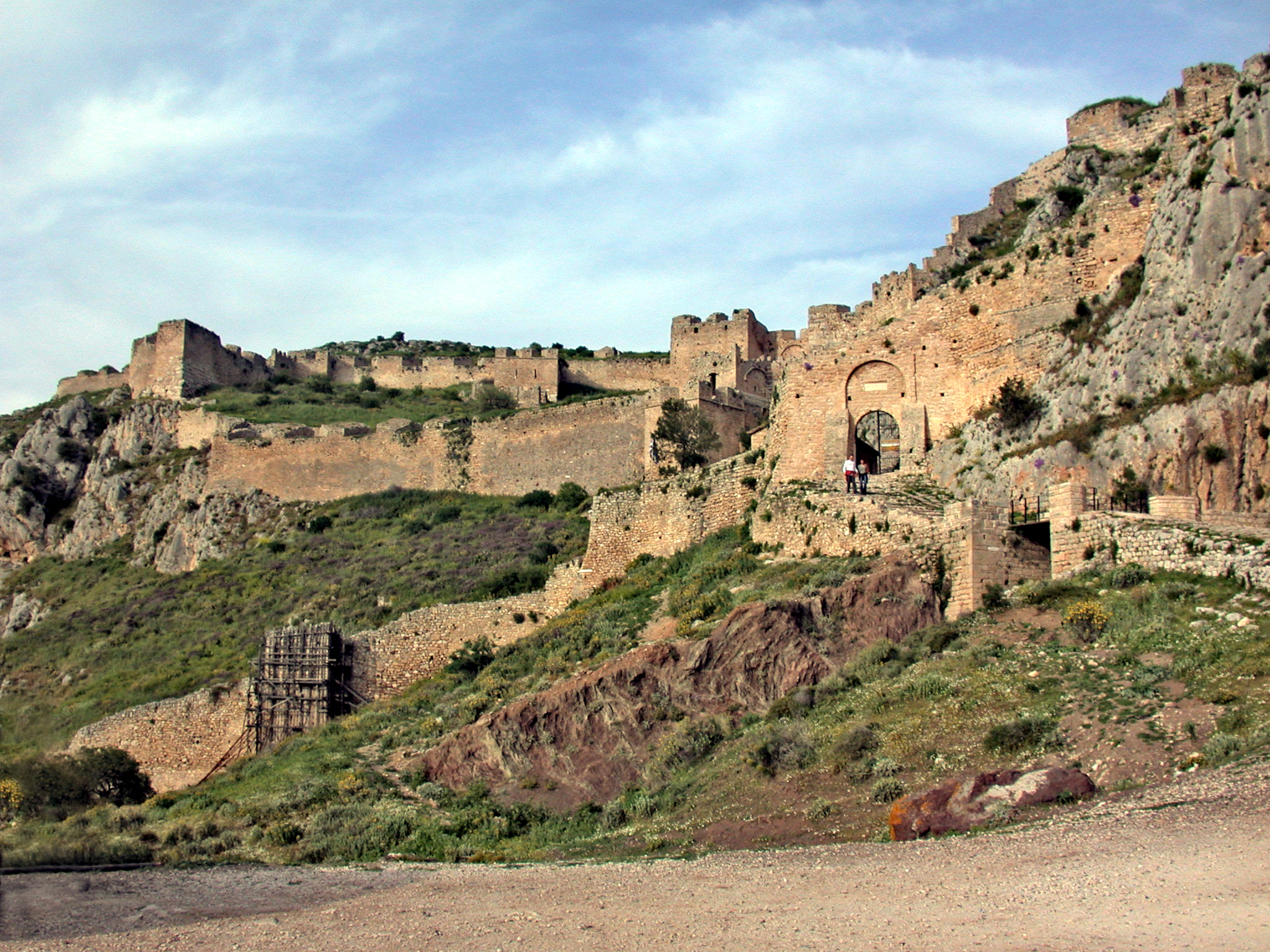
- Castle of Acrocorinto
Date	April–July 1458
Location	Corinth, Morea, Greece
Result	Ottoman victory

Belligerents
Ottoman Empire	Despotate of the Morea; Republic of Venice

Commanders and leaders
Mehmed the Conqueror; Turahanoğlu Ömer Bey; Hamza Bey	Demetrios Palaiologos; Mateos Asanes (surrendered); Nikephoros Loukanes (surrendered)

Units involved
Sipahi; Cavalry; Azeb; Jannisary	Garrison; Venetian army Cavalry; Morean Army

Strength
40,000 (20,000 Cavalry, and other forces); 4 big cannon	Unknown garrison forces 6,000 cavalry (relief army)

Casualties and losses
Heavy (many wounded and dead)	Heavy (many wounded and dead)

The Battle of Corinth or Siege of Corinth was a battle that took place during Mehmed II's first invasion of the Peloponnese. It describes the siege of the largest and strongest fortress in the Peloponnese. After a four-month siege, the fortress surrendered.

== Ultimatum ==
The despots of the Morea were delaying and withholding the tribute they owed to Mehmed II. In the winter of 1457, Mehmed II sent a decree to the despots, stating: “Although you willingly promised to pay an annual tribute of 10,000 gold coins, I now see that you no longer wish to honor this obligation and have neglected to fulfill the terms of our agreements. I offer you two options; choose the one you deem best. Either pay your accumulated debts, thereby establishing friendship between us, or relinquish the country to my sovereignty and depart from it immediately.” At the same time, he began preparations for a campaign against the Morea during the winter.

== Campaign ==
In April 1458, Mehmed II began his campaign with a force of 40,000 men composed of Janissaries, azeb, and Anatolian troops, including 20,000 cavalry.

No one knew where the campaign would be directed, and everyone assumed that the preparations were aimed at Serbia, since Mahmud Pasha had been dispatched there with a contingent of troops. Mehmed continued his advance with 20,000 cavalry. Mahmud Pasha's dispatch to Serbia was intended to prevent a possible Hungarian threat and to divert attention. After arriving in Serres, the sultan established his camp there and allowed his army to rest. Continuing his march, the sultan reached the Asopos River and sent reconnaissance units to prevent any potential attack on the Corinth passes. At that moment, envoys from the Morea arrived with 4,500 gold coins. The sultan rejected their offer of peace and replied in a threatening manner, saying, “We shall settle the matter when I arrive there.”

== Siege and defeat of relief army ==
After the returning reconnaissance units reported that the roads were clear, the advance continued. When Mehmed arrived before the fortress of Corinth, he established his camp there. The following day, he took some of his commanders with him to inspect the hill dominating the city and to determine from where an assault might be launched. In this way, they realized that the fortress would not easily yield, as the city was situated on high ground and surrounded by steep and sheer rocky terrain. Although Mehmed demanded the city's surrender, the garrison refused. In order to place the defenders in difficulty by cutting off supplies, Mehmed devastated the surrounding fields and wheat crops. He then encircled the city with his troops and positioned siege equipment around the walls.

After leaving a portion of his army to continue the siege of the fortress, Mehmed II personally led raiding parties into the interior of the Morea in small detachments. The forces under Ömer Bey compelled the fortresses of Tarsos, Akova, Rupela, Pazenika, Kalavryta, and Leondari to surrender. Mehmed II himself entered the territory belonging to Dimitrios Asanes and captured the fortresses of Muhlion, Patras, and Vostitsa.

Mehmed II then returned to Corinth. The fortress and the city had still not been taken. Due to the siege, which had lasted for four months, the soldiers had grown weary and wished to abandon it. However, Mehmed II declared that the fortress would be taken no matter what. After addressing the demands and restoring the morale and determination of his commanders and soldiers, the Ottoman army regained its spirit and prepared once again for the siege.

The Ottoman artillery, however, could only be moved as far as the foot of the fortress. In response, Mehmed II had bronze transported to the Church of Hagios Nikolaos in front of the fortress and ordered the casting of four powerful siege cannons there. The Ottomans successfully applied mobile artillery casting techniques and tactics at this location. Mehmed II then resorted to another stratagem, telling the envoys of the Morea to inform their lord that he wished to speak with him personally and was considering peace. Through this ruse, he lured Despot Demetrios Palaiologos's cavalry force of 6,000 men into the open and defeated them in a sudden maneuver, thereby routing the army that was coming to relieve Corinth.

The commander of the fortress was Mateos Asanes. With Venetian assistance, Asanes had managed to obtain additional troops and supplies. The sultan ordered the massive cannon to be positioned opposite the fortress. The cannonballs, weighing hundreds of kilograms, were fashioned from the ruins of ancient Corinth. In accordance with Islamic tradition, Mehmed once again called upon the defenders to surrender. Confident in the strength of the walls and the garrison, Asanes rejected the offer. Mehmed then brought his great cannons into action. The outer wall was demolished within a few days. After launching a counterattack, Asanes withdrew to the second wall, but this too collapsed under heavy artillery fire.

At the third wall, Mehmed's troops launched an assault. A fierce battle ensued, with both sides killing and wounding one another as their cries rose to the sky. They fought at such close quarters that the combat became hand-to-hand. Nevertheless, the attacks failed to achieve success, as the garrison's frontal resistance, long spears and pikes, and large stones hurled from the walls struck down many of the besiegers at the front. Thereupon, the sultan ordered his troops to withdraw beyond the range of arrows and swords.

By this point, however, famine had begun to take hold within the fortress. Mehmed continued the bombardment. Eventually, Mateos Asanes and Nikephoros Loukanes went to the sultan's camp and surrendered the fortress under terms of peace. Mehmed left Ömer Bey behind as sancak governor and began his return march toward Edirne. During this campaign, Mehmed had brought 250 Greek settlements under his control.
