= Turahan Bey =

Ottoman military commander and governor

- Born: Manisa, Ottoman Empire
- Died: c. August 1456
- Burial place: Larissa
- Relatives: Pasha Yiğit Bey (father); Turahanoğlu Ahmed Bey and Turahanoğlu Ömer Bey (sons)
- Military career
- Allegiance: Ottoman Empire
- Service years: c. 1413–1456
- Wars and campaigns: Byzantine–Ottoman Wars; Crusade of Varna; Battle of Nish (1443); Battle of Melstica

Turahan Bey or Turakhan Beg (Turkish: Turahan Bey/Beğ; Albanian: Turhan Bej; Greek: Τουραχάνης, Τουραχάν μπέης or Τουραχάμπεης; died in 1456) was a prominent Ottoman Turkish military commander and governor of Thessaly from 1423 until his death in 1456. He participated in many Ottoman campaigns of the second quarter of the 15th century, fighting against the Byzantines as well as against the Crusade of Varna. His repeated raids into the Morea transformed the local Byzantine despotate into an Ottoman dependency and opened the way for its conquest. At the same time, his administration of Thessaly, where he settled new peoples, founded the town of Tyrnavos and revitalized the economy, set the groundwork for Ottoman rule in the area for centuries to come.

== Life ==
Nothing is known of Turahan's birth date or early life, except that he was the son of Pasha Yiğit Bey. His father was a prominent general of Turkish Yörük origin who conquered Skopje in 1392 and was the first Ottoman governor of Bosansko Krajište.

Turahan is first mentioned in 1413 as governor of Vidin, and then again in 1422, when he fought against the Byzantine governor of Lamia, Kantakouzenos Strabomytes. During the Ottoman Interregnum he was one of the supporters of Mustafa Çelebi during the latter's struggle against Mehmed I and Murad II. He became governor of Thessaly in early 1423, and led his first major expedition in May–June of the same year, against the Byzantine and Latin domains in the Peloponnese peninsula in southern Greece. His cavalry breached the recently rebuilt Hexamilion wall on 21/22 May and ravaged the interior of the peninsula unopposed. He attacked some Byzantine towns and settlements, such as Mystras, Leontari, Gardiki and Dabia. Aside from the plunder, the expedition was also probably a reconnaissance mission ultimately aimed against Venetian possessions in the area, as Venice was the main driving force behind attempts to unite the various Christian rulers of Greece against the Ottoman advance in the Balkans. Soon after, the Byzantine historian Doukas reports Turahan's presence on the shores of the Black Sea. At about the same time, he also campaigned in Epirus, defeated local Albanian tribes and made them tributary to the Ottoman state. In the 1430s, along with Ali Bey and Ishak Bey, he participated in the campaigns that suppressed an Albanian revolt led by Gjergj Arianiti and Andrew Thopia.

Despite the devastation visited upon the Peloponnese, Turahan's 1423 expedition was only a raid, and the Byzantine Despots of the Morea were able to restore their position and gradually over the next few years bring the entire peninsula under their control. In 1431, Turahan again breached and destroyed the Hexamilion and took Thebes in 1435, to prevent it from falling into the hands of the Moreot Byzantines. The Despotate of the Morea, under the constant threat of renewed Turkish invasion, clung on to a precarious independence only through continuous gifts and payment of tribute to Turahan.

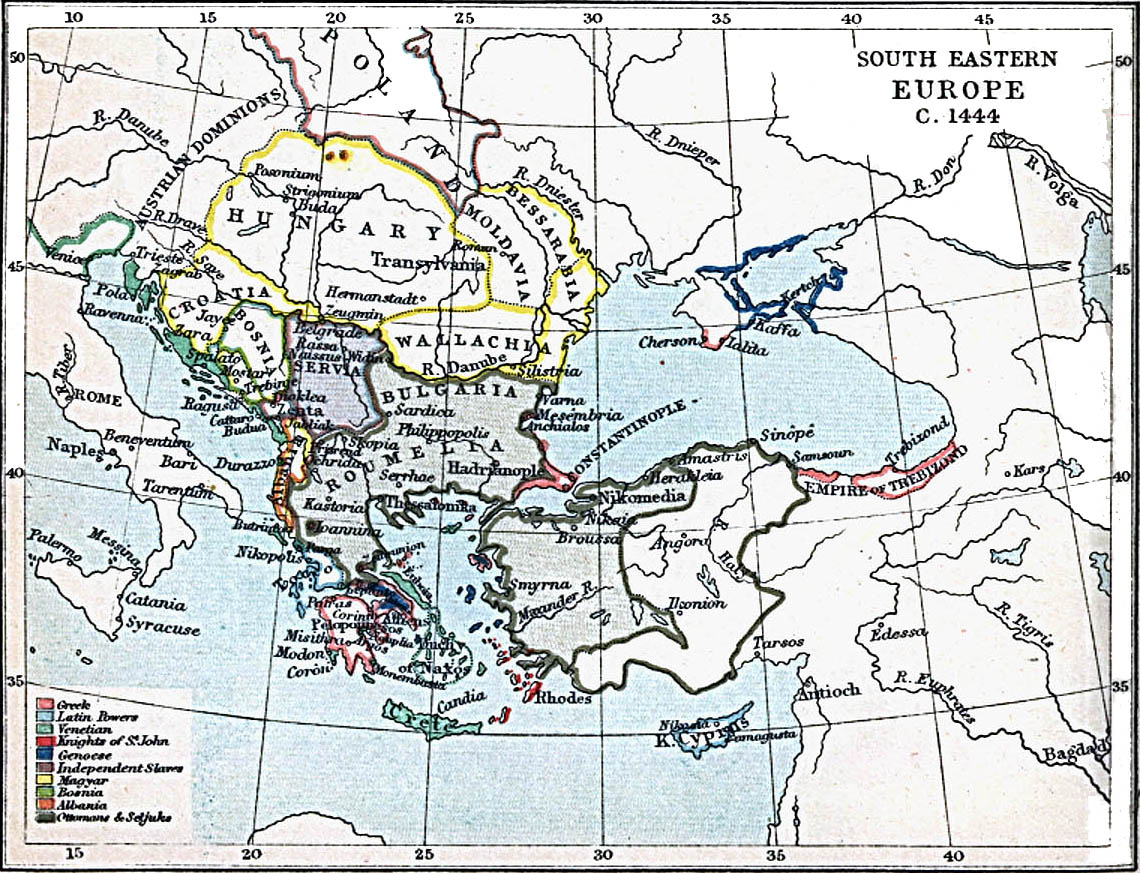
Map of southeastern Europe ca. 1444

In November 1443 Turahan participated in the Battle of Niš against John Hunyadi, which ended in an Ottoman defeat. During their retreat from Niš, Turahan Bey and Kasim Pasha burned all villages between Niš and Sofia. Turahan persuaded Sultan Murad II to abandon Sofia as well, and follow a consequent scorched earth strategy against the Hungarian advance. Although the Hungarians were badly mauled in the Battle of Zlatitsa, in a subsequent action at Kunovica they were able to capture Mahmud Bey, the Sultan's son-in-law, creating the impression of an overall victorious campaign. Contemporary Ottoman sources blame rivalry between Kasim and Turahan for the defeat at Kunovica, while some claim that the Serbian Despot Đurađ Branković bribed Turahan not to participate in the battle. Turahan fell from favour as a result and was banished by the Sultan to a prison in Tokat.

Nevertheless, he was soon restored to his position, as he was present in Murad's 1446 campaign against the Despotate of the Morea. Murad was reportedly disheartened by the strength of the Hexamilion, but Turahan insisted on an assault. Aided by an artillery bombardment, the Ottomans again breached the Byzantine defences and ravaged the Peloponnese at will. As a result, the Despotate of the Morea was now officially reduced to an Ottoman vassal state. In early October 1452, Turahan and his sons Ahmed and Ömer led a large force into the Peloponnese. Sultan Mehmed II ordered them to remain there during the winter in order to prevent despots Thomas and Demetrios from assisting their brother, Emperor Constantine XI, during the Siege of Constantinople in 1453. Turahan again stormed the Hexamilion and penetrated into the Morea, raiding from Corinth through the Argolid and Arcadia to Messenia. The Byzantines put up little resistance after Hexamilion, although Turahan's son Ahmed was captured in an ambush at Dervenakia and imprisoned in Mystras.

The fall of Constantinople on 29 May 1453 had great repercussions in the Peloponnese. The two despots, the brothers Demetrios and Thomas, heartily detested each other and were unpopular among their own subjects. A rebellion broke out against them in autumn, supported both by the local Albanian immigrants and the native Greeks, and spread quickly. As the Sultan's vassals, the despots called upon Turkish aid, and Turahan's son Ömer arrived in December. After a few successes, he departed after securing the release of his brother from captivity. The revolt did not subside, and in October 1454 Turahan himself was forced to intervene. After sacking a few fortresses, the rebellious populace capitulated. Turahan advised the two despots to compose their differences and rule well, and then departed the peninsula. The two brothers were however unable to reconcile themselves, and soon reverted to quarreling and conspiring with Western powers against the Sultan. In retaliation, Mehmed II campaigned in the Peloponnese in 1458 and seized the northwestern half of the peninsula, which became an Ottoman province under Ömer. The rest of the despotate followed in 1460.

Turahan himself was recalled to Adrianople in October 1455 and died ca. August 1456. He was buried at Kirk Kvak near Uzun Köprü in Thrace, but his memorial tomb (türbe) survives to this day in the city. His descendants, the Turahanoğlu, were wealthy landowners in Thessaly until the end of the Ottoman rule there in the late 19th century; with the exception of his sons however, they did not rise to any wider prominence.

== Legacy ==
Turahan Bey ranked among the great, practically semi-autonomous Ottoman "marcher-lords" (uç beyi) of the 15th-century Balkans, along the likes of Evrenos. He was instrumental in the establishment of Ottoman rule in Thessaly and central Greece in general. Aside from his campaigns of conquest, he brought in 5,000 Turkish settlers (Yörüks and Koniars) whom he settled in a string of twelve villages across the province to strengthen Ottoman military control. In addition, according to Turahan's Arab-language biography, which the Scottish traveller David Urquhart reported to be still extant in the 1830s in Tyrnavos, he was also the first to institute a Greek militia for the lawless mountainous regions of central Greece, the forerunners of the later Armatoloi.

Turahan also took several measures to restore order and prosperity in his province, most notably the foundation (or re-foundation) of the town of Tyrnavos, which before was a small pastoral settlement. To attract and protect the local Greek Orthodox population, he granted it special privileges, such as special administrative status as a waqf (a religious endowment) of the Sharif of Mecca, tax exemptions and the prohibition of Ottoman troops from passing through the town. He also endowed it with both a mosque (destroyed after the Greek annexation of Thessaly in 1881) and a church, St Nicholas Turahan, which survives to this day. Turahan also endowed many other public buildings such as mosques, monasteries, madrasas, schools, caravanserais, bridges and baths across the province. He also took care to maintain and foster the Thessalian cotton, silk and wool textile industry, to the extent that later generations attributed to him the introduction of new dye techniques based on yellow berries, madder and the kali plant, used in the manufacture of potash. From there these materials spread to the rest of Rumelia and thence to Western Europe.

== Family tree ==
After Franz Babinger in the Encyclopedia of Islam:

Pasha Yiğit Bey
Ishak Bey	Turahan Bey
Isa Bey Isaković	Ahmed Bey	Ömer Bey
Hasan Bey	Idris Bey

== Sources ==
- Babinger, Franz (1987) [1936]. "Turakhān Beg". In Houtsma, Martijn Theodoor (ed.). E.J. Brill's First Encyclopaedia of Islam, 1913–1936, Volume VIII. Leiden: BRILL. pp. 876–878. ISBN 90-04-09794-5.
- Babinger, Franz (1992) [1978]. Mehmed the Conqueror and His Time. Bollingen Series 96. Translated from the German by Ralph Manheim. Edited, with a preface, by William C. Hickman. Princeton, New Jersey: Princeton University Press. ISBN 0-691-09900-6.
- Fine, John V. A. (1994) [1987]. The Late Medieval Balkans: A Critical Survey from the Late Twelfth Century to the Ottoman Conquest. Ann Arbor, Michigan: University of Michigan Press. ISBN 978-0-472-10079-8.
- Emecen, Feridun (2012). "Turahan Bey". TDV Encyclopedia of Islam, Vol. 41 (Tevekkül – Tüsterî) (in Turkish). Istanbul: Presidency of Religious Affairs, Centre for Islamic Studies. pp. 405–407. ISBN 978-975-389-713-6.
- Imber, Colin (2006). The Crusade of Varna, 1443–45. Aldershot: Ashgate Publishing. ISBN 978-0-7546-0144-9.
- İnalcık, Halil (1978). The Ottoman Empire: Conquest, Organization and Economy. London: Variorum Reprints. ISBN 978-0-86078-032-8.
- John Jefferson (17 August 2012). The Holy Wars of King Wladislas and Sultan Murad: The Ottoman-Christian Conflict from 1438-1444. BRILL. ISBN 978-90-04-21904-5.
- Nicol, Donald M. (1993) [1972]. The Last Centuries of Byzantium, 1261–1453 (Second ed.). Cambridge: Cambridge University Press. ISBN 978-0-521-43991-6.
- Setton, Kenneth M. (1978). The Papacy and the Levant (1204–1571), Volume II: The Fifteenth Century. Vol. 2. Philadelphia: The American Philosophical Society. ISBN 0-87169-127-2.
- Toynbee, Arnold J. (1981). The Greeks and Their Heritages. Oxford: Oxford University Press. ISBN 978-0-19-215256-5.
- Trapp, Erich; Beyer, Hans-Veit; Kaplaneres, Sokrates; Leontiadis, Ioannis (1991). "29165. Τουραχάνης". Prosopographisches Lexikon der Palaiologenzeit (in German). Vol. 11. Vienna: Verlag der Österreichischen Akademie der Wissenschaften. ISBN 3-7001-3003-1.
- Vakalopoulos, Apostolos E. (1974). Ιστορία του νέου ελληνισμού, Τόμος Α′: Αρχές και διαμόρφωσή του (Έκδοση Β′) [History of modern Hellenism, Volume I: Its origins and formation (2nd Edition)] (in Greek). Thessaloniki: Emm. Sfakianakis & Sons.

New title	Ottoman governor of Thessaly; 1423–1456	Succeeded by Ömer Bey
