= Isaković =

Isaković (Serbian: Исаковић) is a Bosniak and Serb patronymic surname derived from a masculine given name Isak (Isaac). It may refer to:

- Aladin Isaković (born 1985), Bosnian footballer
- Alija Isaković (1932–1997), Bosnian writer
- Antonije Isaković (1923–2002), writer
- Boris Isaković (born 1966), actor
- Branko Isaković (born 1958), musician
- Mile Isaković (born 1958), handball player
- Mirjana Isaković (born 1936), artist
- Sara Isaković (1988), swimmer
- Vuk Isaković (1696–1759), military commander
