= Siege of Corinth order of battle =

The order of battle for the Siege of Corinth (also known as the First Battle of Corinth) includes:

- Siege of Corinth order of battle: Confederate
- Siege of Corinth order of battle: Union

== See also ==
- Battle of Corinth (disambiguation)
