= Battle of Corinth =

The battle of Corinth or the siege of Corinth may refer to:

== Battles ==
- Battle of Nemea (394 BC), also known as the Battle of Corinth, during the Corinthian War in ancient Greece
- Battle of Corinth (146 BC), in ancient Greece
- Battle of Corinth (1458), during the Ottoman conquest of the Morea
- Siege of Corinth (1463), during the Ottoman–Venetian War (1463–1479)
- Siege of Corinth (1715), during the Ottoman reconquest of the Morea
- Siege of Corinth (1822), unsuccessful siege by the Greek rebels during the Greek War of Independence
- Siege of Corinth (1823), successful siege by the Greek rebels during the Greek War of Independence
- Siege of Corinth (April–June 1862), in Mississippi, U.S. (also known as the First Battle of Corinth)
- Second Battle of Corinth (October 1862), in Mississippi, U.S.
- Battle of the Corinth Canal (April 1941), fought as part of the Axis invasion of Greece during World War II

== Works ==
- The Siege of Corinth (poem), a poem by Lord Byron, inspired by an incident from the 1715 siege
- Le siège de Corinthe, an opera by Gioachino Rossini, written and set during the 19th-century Greek War of Independence

== See also ==
- Corinthian War (395 BC–387 BC)
