= Battle of Erzincan (1473) =

Ottoman victory in Turkey

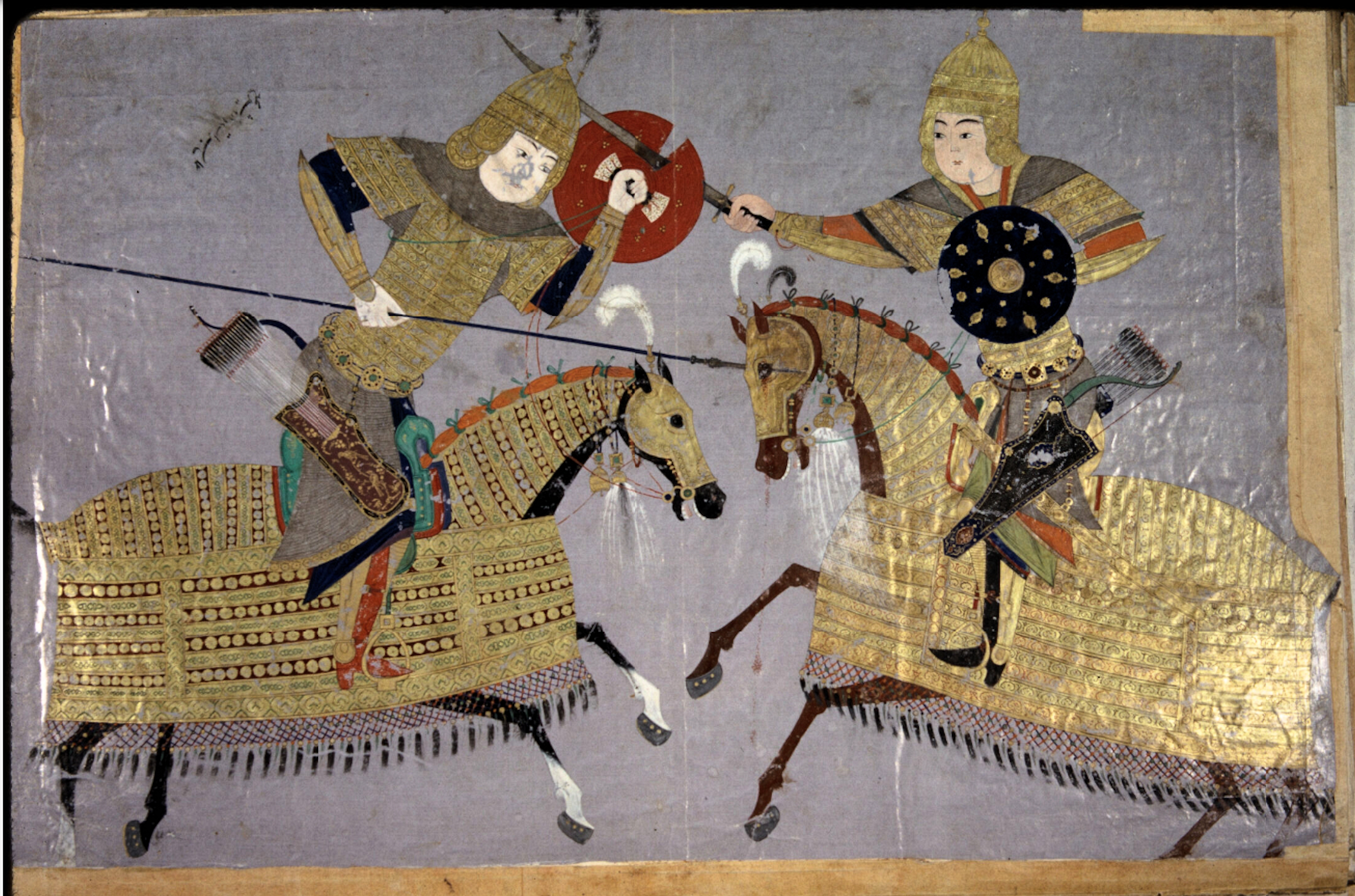
- Aq Qoyunlu cavalry in the battle
Date	1473
Location	Erzincan, Turkey
Result	Ottoman victory

Belligerents
Ottoman Empire	Aq Qoyunlu

Commanders and leaders
Mehmed the Conqueror; Turahanoğlu Ömer Bey; Mahmud Angelović	Uzun Hasan; Mehmed of Erzincan; Cemşid Beg

Strength
5,000 cavalry	5,000 cavalry

Casualties and losses
Light	50 prisoners, several banners were captured

The Battle of Erzincan was fought in 1473 near Erzincan, Turkey. It was a preliminary battle where Ottoman sultan Mehmed II and Uzun Hasan, the sultan of Aq Qoyunlu, tested each other before the Battle of Otlukbeli.

== Before ==
After taking up battle formation in Sivas, Turkey the Ottoman army continued its march. However, the army's advance became increasingly difficult due to the mountainous terrain. As a result, soldiers had to tie belts to trees and cross the mountain one by one. Despite 40 days of this journey, there was still no news of Uzun Hasan. However, at Niksar, Turkish raiders were attacked by Uzun Hasan's forces. The Ottoman army, having driven them back, raided the surrounding area and finally arrived in Erzincan.

== Battle ==
Here they encountered a force of 5,000 men belonging to Uzun Hasan. Sultan Mehmed saw that Uzun Hasan had sent against the troops of Mehmed Bey of Erzincan and Cemşid Beg. Sultan Mehmed then sent Turahanoğlu Ömer Bey against them. Turahanoğlu Ömer Bey attacked enemy forces of equal size with a 5,000-man cavalry force. The attack resulted in the capture of 50 prisoners and several banners. The Aq Qoyunlu forces, unable to offer significant resistance, retreated towards Tercan. Mahmud and Murad Pashas interpreted this enemy withdrawal differently. While Murad Pasha advocated pursuing the enemy, Mahmud Pasha, an experienced commander, argued that the enemy's withdrawal was a planned trap. If the Euphrates River were crossed, the Ottoman army would be separated, and any encounter could have led to their own disaster.
