= Turahanoğlu Ömer Bey =

Ottoman general and politician who conquered Athens (fl. 1435-84)

Personal details
- Relations: Turahan Bey (father); Turahanoğlu Ahmet Bey (brother)
- Family: Turahanoğlu

Military service
- Allegiance: Ottoman Empire
- Years of service: c. 1444–1480s
- Wars and campaigns: Byzantine-Ottoman wars, Battle of Corinth (1458); Ottoman–Wallachian wars; Battle of Buzău; Ottoman–Venetian War (1463–1479); Battle of Kljuc (1463); Siege of Corinth (1463); Battle of Mystras (1464); Battle of Zvornik (1464); Battle of Patras (1466); Battle of Erzincan (1473); Battle of Malatya; Battle of Isonzo (1477); Siege of Kruje (1478); Ottoman–Mamluk War (1485–1491); Battle of Aga-Cayiri

Turahanoğlu Ömer Bey (Greek: Ὀμάρης or Ἀμάρης; fl. 1435–1484) was an Ottoman general and governor. The son of the famed Turahan Bey, he was active chiefly in southern Greece: he fought in the Morea against both the Byzantines in the 1440s and 1450s and against the Venetians in the 1460s, while in 1456, he conquered the Duchy of Athens. He also fought in Albania, north-east Italy, Wallachia and Anatolia.

== Family ==
He was born in the Turkish Turahanoğlu family of Yürük origin, descended from Yiğit Bey of Saruhan. Ömer was the son of the prominent akıncı leader and governor of Thessaly, Turahan Bey, and thus a grandson of Yiğit Bey, the conqueror of Skopje. He had a brother, Ahmet Bey, and two sons, Hasan and Idris, the latter of whom was a notable poet and translator of Persian poetry.

== Wars against the Byzantines ==
The exact date of Ömer's birth is unknown; as a young man, he was presented to the Byzantine envoy George Sphrantzes in 1435, and by 1444 he was old enough to assume his father's duties as uç bey ("marcher-lord") of Thessaly during Turahan's temporary disgrace. In the same year, Ömer led a raid against the Duchy of Athens, which was falling under the influence of the energetic Byzantine prince Constantine Palaiologos, the ruler of the Despotate of the Morea. This display of force, coupled with the decisive Ottoman victory in the Battle of Varna, convinced the Duke of Athens, Nerio II Acciaioli, to revert to his Ottoman allegiance. Ömer also participated in the retaliatory campaign of Sultan Murad II against Palaiologos in late 1446. The Ottomans breached the Hexamilion wall and devastated the Morea, forcing the despots to become Ottoman vassals. In 1449, as Constantine Palaiologos became the new Byzantine emperor and left the Morea, his brothers Demetrios Palaiologos and Thomas Palaiologos began to quarrel about their share of the rule of the Despotate. Eventually the dispute was settled through the mediation of Constantine and Ömer, who used the opportunity to completely demolish the Hexamilion.

In October 1452, Ömer and his brother accompanied Turahan in another expedition against the Morea, which was designed to prevent the Despotate from assisting in the forthcoming Ottoman attack on the Byzantine capital, Constantinople. After the Turks breached the rebuilt Hexamilion, the Byzantines put up little resistance, and Turahan's troops plundered their way from Corinthia to Messenia. Ahmed however was captured in an ambush at Dervenakia and imprisoned in Mistra. The Fall of Constantinople on 29 May 1453 had great repercussions in the Morea. The two despots continued their rivalry and were unpopular among their own subjects. A rebellion broke out against them in autumn, supported both by the local Albanian immigrants and the native Greeks, and spread quickly. As the Sultan's vassals, the despots called upon Turahan for aid, and he dispatched Ömer in December. Ömer achieved a few successes, but departed after securing the release of his brother from captivity. The revolt did not subside, and in 1454 Turahan himself, again accompanied by his sons, was forced to intervene and quell the revolt.

In 1456, Ömer succeeded his father as governor of Thessaly, and in the same year his troops occupied the city of Athens. The duke, Francesco II Acciaioli, and the inhabitants fled to the Acropolis, where they held out for two years until they surrendered in June 1458. In the same year, the Sultan Mehmed II campaigned in person against the Morea, where the two despots had returned to their quarrels and were negotiating with Western powers for aid against the Ottomans. Mehmed overcame the Byzantine resistance at Hexamilion and stormed the strategically important Acrocorinth. Thereupon the despots hastened to reconfirm their allegiance, but the northeastern quarter of the Morea was annexed as a full Ottoman province and Ömer became its first governor. Ömer accompanied Mehmed on the Sultan's visit to Athens in August 1458, and took up residence in the ducal palace in the Propylaea.

In 1459 the despot Thomas rebelled against the Sultan with assistance from Italy, and Ömer was for a time removed from his offices for failing to prevent it, although some contemporary sources suggest that he was himself encouraging the rebellion. The Sultan sent Hamza Pasha to depose and arrest him and replaced him as governor the Morea with Zagan Pasha. Ömer nevertheless participated in the subsequent campaign against the Morea, which saw the final extirpation of the Despotate.

In 1461/1462 Ömer served with distinction in the wars against Vlad III Dracula, Prince of Wallachia: he wiped out a force of 6,000 Wallachians and deposited 2,000 of their heads at the feet of Mehmed II. As a reward, he was reinstated in his old gubernatorial post in Thessaly.

== Wars against the Venetians ==
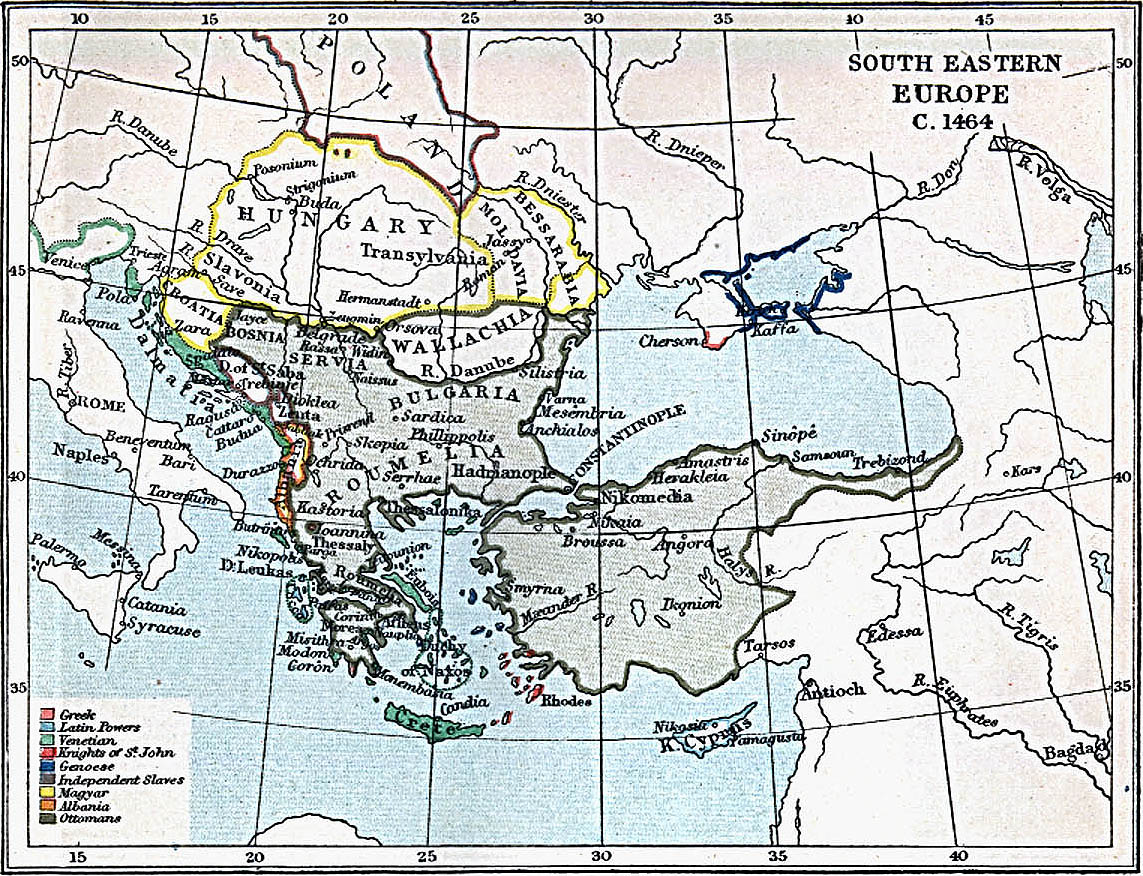
Map of the Ottoman Empire and its neighbouring states in 1464

At this time, tensions became heightened with the Venetians as a slave of the Ottoman commander of Athens fled to the Venetian fortress of Coron (Koroni) with 100,000 aspers from his master's treasury. The Venetians refused to hand him back, and in retaliation, Ömer attacked the port town of Lepanto (Nafpaktos) in November 1462 but failed to capture it. A few months later, Isa Bey, governor of the Morea, took the Venetian fortress of Argos through treason. These events precipitated the outbreak of a long war between the Venetian Republic and the Ottoman Empire. In the summer of 1463, Ömer led the eastern wing of the Ottoman army that conquered Bosnia.

In the weeks after their declaration of war on 28 July 1463, the Venetians made good progress in the Morea, occupying most of the peninsula, and laid siege to the Acrocorinth in early autumn. Ömer Bey returned from Bosnia and marched to relieve the siege, but did not attempt to breach the Hexamilion wall due to the presence of numerous Venetian cannons and the small size of his own army. Ömer was disheartened enough to oppose any action to be undertaken even after the arrival of substantial reinforcements under the Grand Vizier Mahmud Pasha Angelović, and preferred to await the arrival of the Sultan himself. Nevertheless, Mahmud Pasha decided to move, and the Venetians, whose army had been depleted by dysentery, abandoned the Hexamilion without a fight. The Ottomans razed the wall yet again and advanced into the Morea. Argos surrendered and was razed, and several forts and localities that had recognized Venetian authority reverted to their Ottoman allegiance. Zagan Pasha was re-appointed governor of the Morea, while Ömer Bey was given Mahmud Pasha's army and tasked with taking the Republic's holdings in the southern Peloponnese, centred on the two forts of Coron and Modon (Methoni). Ömer raided the districts around the two fortresses and captured numerous prisoners, but the onset of winter precluded any serious operations from being undertaken against them.

In August 1464, the new Venetian commander-in-chief in the Morea, Sigismondo Pandolfo Malatesta, besieged the fortress of Mistra, the one-time capital of the Byzantine despotate. Ömer with his army marched against him, forcing him to raise the siege. Over the next year, the war in the Morea was dominated by raids and sieges of isolated forts. Ömer held the initiative and moved at will against the Venetians and their supporters, for the mostly mercenary Venetian troops, starved of supplies, pay and reinforcements, were largely confined to their coastal forts and unable or unwilling to venture into the interior. In late July/early August 1466, Ömer achieved two major victories against the Venetians. With 12,000 men he destroyed an army of 2,000 that was besieging Patras and killed its commander, Jacomo Barbarigo, and 600 of his men. A few days later he defeated another Venetian expeditionary force under Vettore Cappello, which lost 1,200 men. Cappello himself barely escaped and died a few months later of grief. Ömer reappears in the historical sources in 1470. Following the Ottoman conquest of Negroponte (Chalkis) in July after a long and bloody siege, Ömer led an army of 25,000 in the Morea, where he quickly conquered Vostitza (Aigion).

In 1473, he participated in the campaign against Uzun Hasan, Venice's ally in the East; and was one of the many senior commanders captured in an ambush on 1 August 1473. His captivity however did not last long, for Uzun Hasan's army suffered a crushing defeat at the Battle of Otluk Beli on 11 August. In autumn 1477 he was sent to Slovenia to fight against the Venetians. There he ambushed and routed the army of the Venetian Captain-General, Girolamo Novella, and with his cavalry raided Venetian territory in the region of the Isonzo, Piave and Tagliamento rivers. Finally, in 1478 he captured the fortress of Scutari (Shkodër) in Albania, which along with the conquest of Krujë by Mehmed II ended the League of Lezhë and Albanian independence.

The date of his death is unknown, but he was still alive in 1484, when his will was written.

== See also ==
- Gazi Omer Bey Mosque, named after him

== Sources ==
- Babinger, Franz (1987) [1936]. "Turakhān Beg". In Houtsma, Martijn Theodoor (ed.). E.J. Brill's first encyclopaedia of Islam, 1913–1936, Volume VIII. Leiden: BRILL. pp. 876–878. ISBN 90-04-09794-5.
- Babinger, Franz (1992) [1978]. Mehmed the Conqueror and His Time. Bollingen Series 96. Translated from the German by Ralph Manheim. Edited, with a preface, by William C. Hickman. Princeton, New Jersey: Princeton University Press. ISBN 0-691-09900-6.
- Setton, Kenneth M. (1978). The Papacy and the Levant (1204–1571), Volume II: The Fifteenth Century. Vol. 2. Philadelphia: The American Philosophical Society. ISBN 0-87169-127-2.
- Stavrides, Théoharis (2001). The Sultan of Vezirs: The Life and Times of the Ottoman Grand Vezir Mahmud Pasha Angelovic (1453–1474). Brill. ISBN 90-04-12106-4.
- Trapp, Erich; Beyer, Hans-Veit; Walther, Rainer; Sturm-Schnabl, Katja; Kislinger, Ewald; Leontiadis, Ioannis; Kaplaneres, Sokrates (1976–1996). Prosopographisches Lexikon der Palaiologenzeit (in German). Vienna: Verlag der Österreichischen Akademie der Wissenschaften. ISBN 3-7001-3003-1.

Preceded by Turahan Bey	Ottoman governor of Thessaly; 1456–1459	Succeeded by Hamza Pasha
New title	Ottoman governor of the Morea; 1458–1459	Succeeded by Zagan Pasha
Preceded by Hamza Pasha (?)	Ottoman governor of Thessaly; 1462–unknown	Unknown
