= Morea revolt of 1453–1454 =

- Part of the Ottoman Wars in Europe
- Map of the Morea in the Middle Ages
Date	1453–1454
Location	Despotate of the Morea
Result	Byzantine-Ottoman victory; Revolt suppressed

Belligerents
Albanian rebels Greek rebels Latin rebels	Byzantine Empire: Despotate of the Morea; Ottoman Empire

Commanders and leaders
Peter Bua; John Asen Zaccaria; Manuel Kantakouzenos	Thomas Palaiologos; Demetrios Palaiologos; Turahanoğlu Ömer Bey

Strength
30,000 Albanians; Considerable number of Greeks	Unknown

Casualties and losses
Unknown	Unknown

The Morea revolt of 1453–1454 was a rebellion carried out against the rule of the brothers Thomas and Demetrios Palaiologos, rulers of the Byzantine Despotate of the Morea in the Peloponnese peninsula.

== Background ==
The Byzantine Empire had ruled over the Morea for centuries before the rebellion. During the second half of the 14th century, several thousand Albanians had settled in the area. After the Battle of Varna in 1444, the Ottoman Turks had a free hand in dealing with the remnants of the Byzantine Empire, which had been in decline for over a century. In 1446, the Ottomans invaded the Byzantine Morea which was then jointly administrated by the two brothers, the Despots Constantine and Thomas Palaiologos. The brothers successfully resisted the invasion, but at the cost of devastating the countryside of the Morea, and the Turks carrying off 60,000 Greek civilians back to their territory. Murad II, the Ottoman Sultan, concluded a peace treaty which resulted in the brothers paying a heavy tribute to the Turks, accepting vassalage to them and a promise not to oppose them in the future, for Murad had to deal with his own internal conflicts elsewhere.

Upon the death of Byzantine Emperor John VIII Palaiologos in Constantinople in October 1448, the imperial throne fell to Constantine, who was crowned on 6 January 1449 in Mystras before departing for the capital. Two months later, he assumed his new role in Constantinople as Emperor Constantine XI. His younger brothers, Thomas and Demetrios remained in charge of the Morea as joint Despots in his place. Despite assurances to Constantine that they would pledge support to one another, both Thomas and Demetrios coveted the other's lands – in addition, they pressed claims against Venetian port possessions in the Morea, alienating the only power capable of aiding them in resisting the Turks. The mutual hostility went to the point that both despots requested military aid from the Turks against the other. During the final siege of Constantinople, the new Sultan, Mehmed II invaded the Morea again as a distraction to prevent the brothers sending any provisions to Constantinople.

== Revolt ==
Shortly after the fall of Constantinople and the death of the last Byzantine Emperor Constantine XI, a large-scale revolt broke out among the Moreote Albanians against the two brothers, Thomas and Demetrios, due to the chronic insecurity and tribute payment to the Turks. Some 30,000 Albanians participated in the revolt, having been aroused by Pjetër Bua, who was one of their chieftains, and quickly sent envoys to the Venetians, promising to place themselves under the Republic. The Venetian Senate quickly resolved to support this plea and send an ambassador to the rebels, but for reasons that are not fully clear this was not done; perhaps the Venetians feared that their interference in the Morea would result in war with the Ottomans. In the summer of 1454, another Venetian ambassador, Vettore Capello, was instead sent to the Morea to negotiate with all parties and try to purchase strategically important port cities for the Republic.

The Albanians were soon joined by a considerable number of Greeks, who chose Manuel Kantakouzenos, a former governor of the Mani Peninsula and likely a grandson of the earlier Despot Matthew Kantakouzenos, as their leader in Demetrios' lands. As the common Despot of both Greeks and Albanians, Kantakouzenos adopted the Albanian first name Ghin, and his wife Maria that of Cuchia. In Thomas' dominions, the revolt was led by John Asen Zaccaria, the son of the last Prince of Achaea, Centurione II Zaccaria, who had already led a failed uprising in 1446, and had been imprisoned with his eldest son by Thomas. During the initial confusion, they had managed to escape with the help of a clever Greek, Nicephorus Loukanis, who remained his chief adviser. The Venetian Doge Francis Foscari and King Alfonso V of Naples sent John congratulation letters, recognising him as "Prince Centurione III". The recognition of John's title by the Crown of Naples was a gesture of great importance since the sovereigns of Naples had been the nominal overlords of the Principality of Achaea following the Viterbo treaty of William of Villehardouin and Charles of Anjou in 1267. John also requested to be recognized by the sultan as Prince of Morea, but Mehmed reinforced the Palaiologoi brothers.

As the Sultan's vassals, the despots called upon Turkish aid, and Omar, the son of the Ottoman governor of Thessaly Turakhan Beg arrived in December 1453. After scoring a victory against the rebels, he departed, having secured the release of his brother Ahmed, who had been captured by the Byzantines in 1452. The revolt did not subside however, and in October 1454 Turakhan himself was forced to intervene. His arrival forced Zaccaria to abandon his siege on Patras and retreat to Aetos.

After sacking a few fortresses, the rebellious populace capitulated. Turakhan advised the two Palaiologoi to settle their differences and rule well, and then departed the peninsula. Tribute was reinstated to the same levels and the Despots were to continue their vassalage as before. As for the rebel leaders, Bua was pardoned by Mehmet and later became a spokesperson for the Albanian people, Zaccaria fled and ended up as a pensioner in Venice and later the Papal Court, while Kantakouzenos escaped and disappeared from history.
