= Ottoman–Venetian War (1463–1479) =

Series of conflicts from 1463 to 1479

- Part of the Ottoman–Venetian wars
Date	1463 – 25 January 1479
Location	Morea (Peloponnese), Negroponte (Euboea), Albania, Aegean Sea, Anatolia, Balkan and the Black Sea
Result	Ottoman victory Treaty of Constantinople (1479)
Territorial changes	Morea, Negroponte and Albania conquered by the Ottoman Empire

Belligerents
Republic of Venice; Papal States; Principality of Zeta; Kingdom of Hungary; Despotate of Epirus; Knights Hospitaller; Crown of Aragon; Kingdom of Naples; Aq Qoyunlu; League of Lezhë; Duchy of Burgundy; Holy Roman Empire; Principality of Moldavia; Kingdom of Croatia; Duchy of Saint Sava; Kingdom of France; Republic of Ragusa; Grand Duchy of Lithuania; Crown of Castile; Florence; Karamanids; Greek rebels (including Maniots)	Ottoman Empire

Commanders and leaders
Alvise Loredan; Giacomo Loredan; Sigismondo Malatesta; Vettore Cappello; Antonio da Canal; Pietro Mocenigo; Skanderbeg; Lekë Dukagjini; Ivan Crnojević; Uzun Hasan; Matthias Corvinus; Stephen the Great; Krokodeilos Kladas; Theodore Kladas	(Ottoman Empire) Mehmed II (Ottoman Empire) Ömer Bey (Ottoman Empire) Mahmud Pasha

The Eastern Mediterranean in 1450, just before the Fall of Constantinople. Venetian possessions are in green and orange. By 1463, the Ottoman dominions would have expanded to include the Byzantine Empire (purple), and most of the smaller Balkan states.

The First Ottoman–Venetian War was fought between the Republic of Venice with its allies and the Ottoman Empire from 1463 to 1479. Fought shortly after the capture of Constantinople and the remnants of the Byzantine Empire by the Ottomans, it resulted in the loss of several Venetian holdings in Albania and Greece, most importantly the island of Negroponte (Euboea), which had been a Venetian protectorate for centuries. The war also saw the rapid expansion of the Ottoman navy, which became able to challenge the Venetians and the Knights Hospitaller for supremacy in the Aegean Sea. In the closing years of the war, however, the Republic managed to recoup its losses by the de facto acquisition of the Crusader Kingdom of Cyprus.

== Background ==
Following the Fourth Crusade (1203–1204), the lands of the Byzantine Empire were divided among several Latin states, ushering in the period known in Greek as Latinokratia. Despite the resurgence of the Byzantine Empire under the Palaiologos dynasty in the later 13th century, many of these "Latin" states survived until the rise of a new power, the Ottoman Empire. Chief among these was the Republic of Venice, which had founded an extensive maritime empire, controlling numerous coastal possessions and islands in the Adriatic, Ionian, and Aegean Seas. In its first conflict with the Ottomans, Venice had already lost the city of Thessalonica in 1430, following a long siege, but the resulting peace treaty left the other Venetian possessions intact.

In 1453, the Ottomans captured the Byzantine capital, Constantinople, and continued to expand their territories in the Balkans, Asia Minor, and the Aegean. Serbia was conquered in 1459, and the last Byzantine remnants, the Despotate of Morea and the Empire of Trebizond were subdued in 1460–1461. The Venetian-controlled Duchy of Naxos and the Genoese colonies of Lesbos and Chios became tributaries in 1458, only for the latter to be directly annexed four years later. The Ottoman advance thus inevitably posed a threat to Venice's holdings in southern Greece, and, following the Ottoman conquest of Bosnia in 1463, on the Adriatic coast as well.

== Outbreak of the war ==
According to the Greek historian Michael Critobulus, hostilities broke out because of the flight of an Albanian slave of the Ottoman commander of Athens to the Venetian fortress of Coron (Koroni) with 100,000 silver aspers from his master's treasure. The fugitive then converted to Christianity, and demands for his rendition by the Ottomans were therefore refused by the Venetian authorities. Using this as a pretext, in November 1462, Turahanoğlu Ömer Bey, the Ottoman commander in central Greece, attacked and very nearly succeeded in taking the strategically important Venetian fortress of Lepanto (Nafpaktos). On 3 April 1463 however, the governor of the Morea, Isa-Beg Ishaković, took the Venetian-held town of Argos by treason.

Although Venice, dependent on the trade with the Ottomans, had in the past been reluctant to confront them in war, the urgings of the papal legate, Cardinal Bessarion, and an impassioned speech by the distinguished Council member Vettore Cappello, tipped the balance, and on 28 July 1463, the Senate narrowly voted for declaring war on the Sublime Porte. Simultaneously, Venice entered into a war with Trieste on its eastern frontier.

Pope Pius II used this opportunity to form yet another Crusade against the Ottomans: on 12 September 1463, Venice and Hungarian king Matthias Corvinus signed an alliance, followed on 19 October by an alliance with the Pope and Duke Philip the Good of Burgundy. According to its terms, upon victory, the Balkans would be divided among the allies. The Morea and the western Greek coast (Epirus) would fall to Venice, Hungary would acquire Bulgaria, Serbia, Bosnia, and Wallachia, the Principality of Kastrioti under Skanderbeg would expand into Macedonia, and the remaining European territories of the Ottomans, including Constantinople, would form a restored Byzantine Empire under the surviving members of the Palaiologos family. Negotiations were also begun with other rivals of the Ottomans, such as Karamanids, Uzun Hassan, and the Crimean Khanate.

== Campaigns in the Morea and the Aegean, 1463–1470 ==
The new alliance launched a two-pronged offensive against the Ottomans: a Venetian army, under the Captain General of the Sea Alvise Loredan, landed in the Morea, while Matthias Corvinus invaded Bosnia. At the same time, Pius II began assembling an army at Ancona, hoping to lead it in person.

Map of the Morea in the Middle Ages

In early August, the Venetians retook Argos and refortified the Isthmus of Corinth, restoring the Hexamilion wall and equipping it with many cannons. They then proceeded to besiege the fortress of the Acrocorinth, which controlled the northwestern Peloponnese. The Venetians engaged in repeated clashes with the defenders and with Ömer Bey's forces, until they suffered a major defeat on 20 October 1463, which resulted in the wounding and subsequent death of the Marquis Bertoldo d'Este (son of Taddeo d'Este). The Venetians were then forced to lift the siege and retreat to the Hexamilion and to Nauplia (Nafplion). In Bosnia, Matthias Corvinus seized over sixty fortified places and succeeded in taking its capital, Jajce after a three-month siege, on 16 December 1463.

The Ottoman reaction was swift and decisive: Sultan Mehmed II dispatched his Grand Vizier, Mahmud Pasha Angelović, with an army against the Venetians. To confront the Venetian navy, which had taken station outside the entrance of the Dardanelles Straits, the Sultan further ordered the creation of the new shipyard of Kadirga Limani in the Golden Horn (named after the "kadirga" type of galley), and of two forts to guard the Straits, Kilidulbahr and Sultaniye. The Morean campaign was a swift victory for the Ottomans: although messages received from Ömer Bey had warned of the strength and firepower of the Venetian position at the Hexamilion, Mahmud Pasha decided to march on, hoping to catch them unaware. In the event, the Ottomans reached the Isthmus just in time to see the Venetian army, demoralized and riddled with dysentery, leave its positions and sail to Nauplia. The Ottoman army razed the Hexamilion, and advanced into the Morea. Argos fell, and several forts and localities that had recognized Venetian authority reverted to their Ottoman allegiance. Zagan Pasha was re-appointed governor of the Morea, while Ömer Bey was given Mahmud Pasha's army and tasked with taking the Republic's holdings in the southern Peloponnese, centered around the two forts of Coron and Modon (Methoni).

Sultan Mehmed II, who was following Mahmud Pasha with another army to reinforce him, had reached Zeitounion (Lamia) before being apprised of his Vizier's success. Immediately, he turned his men north, towards Bosnia. However, the Sultan's attempt to retake Jajce in July and August 1464 failed, with the Ottomans retreating hastily in the face of Corvinus' approaching army. A new Ottoman army under Mahmud Pasha then forced Corvinus to withdraw, but Jajce was not retaken for many years after. However, the death of Pope Pius II on 15 August in Ancona spelled the end of the Crusade.

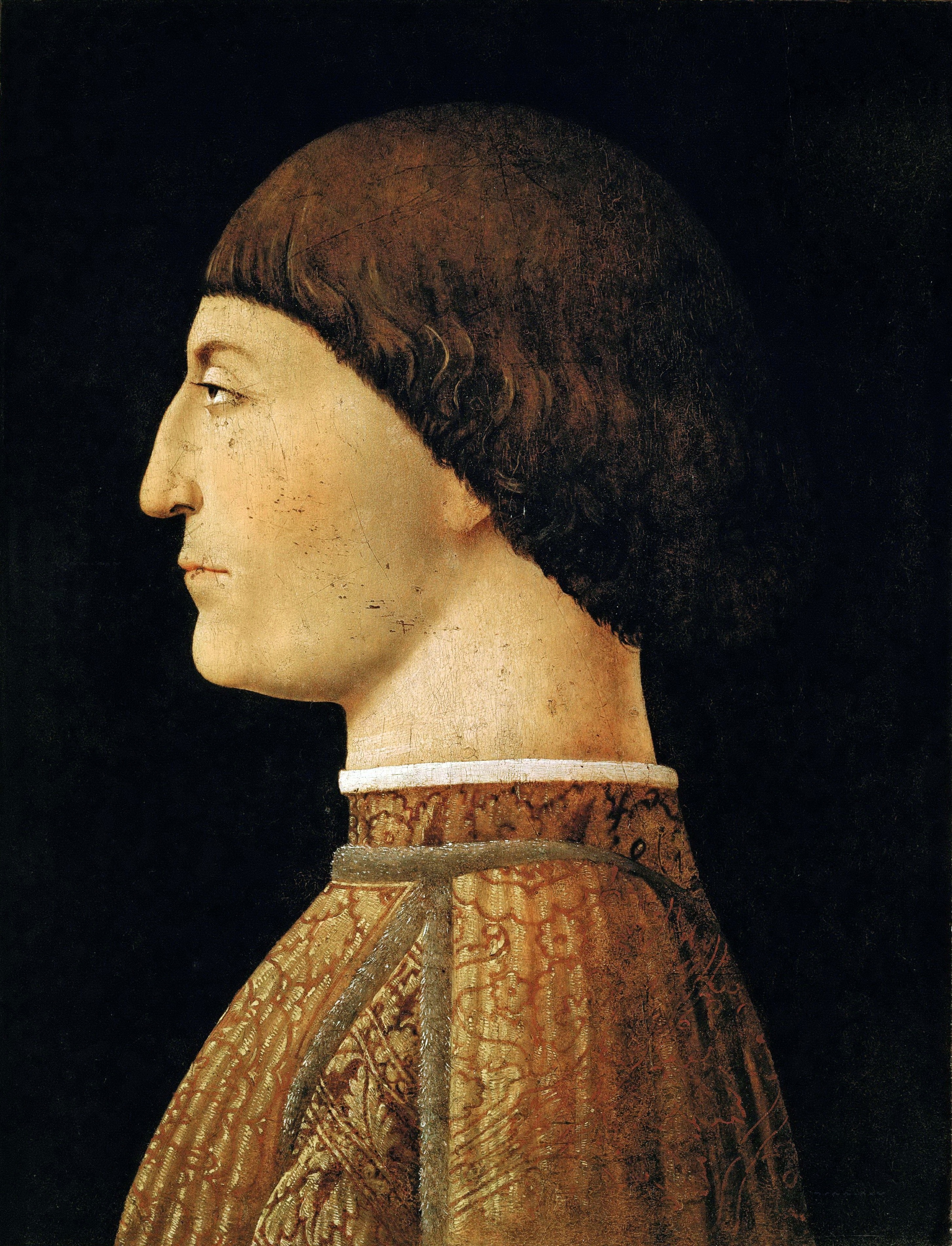
The noted condottiere Sigismondo Malatesta, Lord of Rimini. His tenure in command of the land forces in the Morea (July 1464 to January 1466) failed to reverse the Republic's fortunes.

In the meantime, for the upcoming campaign of 1464, the Republic had appointed Sigismondo Malatesta, the ruler of Rimini and one of the ablest Italian generals, as land commander in the Morea. The forces available to him along with mercenaries and stratioti, however, were limited, and in his tenure in the Morea he was unable to achieve much. Upon his arrival in the Morea in mid-summer, he launched attacks against Ottoman forts, and engaged in a siege of Mistra in August–October. He failed to take the castle, however, and had to abandon the siege at the approach of a relief force under Ömer Bey. Small-scale warfare continued on both sides, with raids and counter-raids, but a shortage of manpower and money meant that the Venetians remained largely confined to their fortified bases, while Ömer Bey's army roamed the countryside. The mercenaries and stratioti in Venice's employ were becoming disgruntled at the lack of pay, while increasingly, the Morea was becoming desolate, as villages were abandoned and fields left untended. The bad supply situation in the Morea forced Ömer Bey to withdraw to Athens in fall 1465. Malatesta himself, disenchanted by the conditions he encountered in the Morea and increasingly anxious to return to Italy and attend to his family's affairs and the ongoing feud with the Papacy, remained largely inactive throughout 1465, in spite of the relative weakness of the Ottoman garrisons following the withdrawal of Ömer Bey from the peninsula.

In the Aegean, the new Venetian admiral, Orsato Giustinian, tried to take Lesbos in the spring of 1464, and besieged the capital Mytilene for six weeks, until the arrival of an Ottoman fleet under Mahmud Pasha on 18 May 1464 forced him to withdraw. Another attempt to capture the island shortly after also failed, and Giustinian died at Modon on 11 July. His successor, Jacopo Loredan, spent the remainder of the year in ultimately fruitless demonstrations of force before the Dardanelles. In early 1465, Mehmed II sent peace feelers to the Venetian Senate. Distrusting the Sultan's motives, these were rejected. Soon after, the Venetians were embroiled in a conflict with the Knights Hospitaller of Rhodes, who had attacked a Venetian convoy carrying Moorish merchants from the Mamluk Sultanate. This event enraged the Mamluks, who imprisoned all Venetian subjects living in the Levant, and threatened to enter the war on the Ottoman side. The Venetian fleet, under Loredan, sailed to Rhodes under orders to release the Moors, even by force. In the event, a potentially catastrophic war between the two major Christian powers of the Aegean was avoided, and the merchants were released to Venetian custody.

By 1465 the Maniot Kladas brothers, Krokodelos and Epifani, were leading bands of stratioti on behalf of Venice against the Ottomans in Southern Peloponnese. They put Vardounia and their lands into Venetian possession, for which Epifani then acted as governor.

In April 1466, Vettore Cappello, the most vociferous proponent of the war, replaced Loredan as Captain General of the Sea. Under his leadership, the Venetian war effort was reinvigorated: the fleet took the northern Aegean islands of Imbros, Thasos and Samothrace, and then sailed into the Saronic Gulf. On 12 July 1466, Cappello landed at Piraeus, and marched against Athens, the Ottomans' major regional base. He failed to take the Acropolis, however, and was forced to retreat to Patras, which was being besieged by the Venetians under the provveditore of the Morea, Jacopo Barbarigo. Before Cappello could arrive there, and as the city seemed on the verge of falling, Omar Beg suddenly appeared with 12,000 cavalry, and drove the outnumbered Venetians off. Six hundred Venetians fell and a hundred were taken prisoner out of a force of 2,000, while Barbarigo himself was killed, and his body impaled. Cappello, who arrived some days later, attacked the Ottomans trying to avenge this disaster, but was heavily defeated. Demoralized, he returned to Negroponte with the remains of his army. There, the Captain General fell ill, and died on 13 March 1467.

In 1470, Sultan Mehmed II campaigned against Negroponte (Chalcis) on the island of Euboea. After a protracted and bloody siege (10 July – 5 August 1470), the well-fortified city was taken by the Ottoman troops. The whole island came under Ottoman control and not long after, Pteleos followed suit.

== War in Albania, 1466–1467 ==
In spring 1466, Sultan Mehmed marched with a large army against the Albanians. Under their leader, Skenderbeg, they had long resisted the Ottomans, and had repeatedly sought assistance from Italy. For the Albanians, the outbreak of the Ottoman–Venetian War offered a golden opportunity to reassert their independence; for the Venetians, they provided a useful cover to the Venetian coastal holdings of Durazzo and Scutari. Notable Montenegrin feudal lord Ivan Crnojević was of high significance for the defence of Scutari, for which he gained fame in Venice. The major result of this campaign was the construction of the fortress of Elbasan, allegedly within just 25 days. This strategically-sited fortress, at the lowlands near the end of the old Via Egnatia, cut Albania effectively in half, isolating Skenderbeg's base in the northern highlands from the Venetian holdings in the south. However, following the Sultan's withdrawal Skanderbeg himself spent the winter in Italy, seeking aid. On his return in early 1467, his forces sallied from the highlands, defeated Ballaban Pasha and lifted the siege of the fortress of Croia (Krujë), attacked Elbasan but failed to capture it. Mehmed II responded by marching again against Albania. He energetically pursued the attacks against the Albanian strongholds, while sending detachments to raid the Venetian possessions to keep them isolated. The Ottomans failing again to take Croia, they failed to subjugate the country but they overthrew Tomornitsa. However, the winter brought an outbreak of plague, which would recur annually and sap the strength of the local resistance. Skanderbeg himself died of malaria in the Venetian stronghold of Lissus (Lezhë), ending the ability of Venice to use the Albanian lords for its own advantage. Venice provided no further aid to the Albanians, who were gradually subdued by the Ottomans over the next decade.

== Final Albanian campaigns, 1474–1479 ==
After Skanderbeg died, some Venetian-controlled Albanian garrisons continued to hold territories coveted by the Ottomans, such as Žabljak Crnojevića, Dagnum, Drisht, Krujë, Lezhë and Shkodër—the most significant. Mehmed II sent his armies to take Shkodra in 1474, but they failed to do so. Then he went personally to lead the siege of Shkodra of 1478–79. The Venetians and Shkodrans resisted the assaults and continued to hold the fortress until Venice ceded Shkodër to the Ottoman Empire in the Treaty of Constantinople on 25 January 1479, as a condition of ending the war.

After the Venetian War, the Ottomans attacked Hungary, but their army was defeated in the Battle of Breadfield.

== Fate of the Despotate of Epirus ==
The Despotate of Epirus, the last surviving rump state of the Byzantine Empire, helped the Venetians. However, Leonardo III Tocco, the ruler of Epirus at the time, wasn't a party in the peace treaty negotiations, or included in its terms. Although he had supported Venice during the war and provided accommodation to its refugees, he caused offence to Venice by seeking friendship and support with its rival, the Kingdom of Naples, since the latter claimed sovereignty in the Ionian islands. As such, the Despotate of Epirus was left undefended against the Ottomans, who conquered it in the summer of 1479, in order to create a base for the planned Ottoman invasion of Italy.
