= Franz Babinger =

German orientalist and historian (1891–1967)

- Born: January 15, 1891; Weiden in der Oberpfalz, German Empire
- Died: June 23, 1967 (aged 76); Durrës, PR Albania

Academic work
- Notable works: Mehmed the Conqueror and His Time

Franz Babinger (15 January 1891 – 23 June 1967) was a German orientalist and historian of the Ottoman Empire, best known for his biography of the Ottoman sultan Mehmed II, known as "the Conqueror", originally published as Mehmed der Eroberer und seine Zeit. An English translation by Ralph Manheim is available from the Princeton University Press, under the title Mehmed the Conqueror and His Time.

== Life ==
Babinger was born in Weiden in der Oberpfalz, Bavaria, as the eldest of four children into a middle-class family. His father was a Roman Catholic, his mother was a Protestant and maternal grandmother of Jewish background. He was already an accomplished academic and linguist by the time he had completed his secondary school studies. Prior to starting University, he had already learned both Persian and Hebrew.

Babinger completed his doctoral studies at the Ludwig-Maximilians-Universität München on the eve of the First World War; after the war started, he joined the German Army. Because of his language skills and abilities, Babinger served in the Middle East, mostly as a liaison-officer, using his experiences to report and research.

After the war, Babinger continued his studies at Friedrich Wilhelm University of Berlin where he completed his Habilitationsschrift in 1921 and became a professor at the same institution. During this period, he published Geschichtsschreiber der Osmanen und ihre Werke ("Historians of the Ottoman Empire"). The work became the standard bibliographical review of Ottoman historiography and confirmed the reputation of the Friedrich Wilhelm University of Berlin as a leading center for Near East studies. The rise of the Nazis to power in 1933 forced him to resign his position. However, the Romanian statesman, academic and polymath Nicolae Iorga, himself a widely respected historian of the Ottoman Empire, invited Babinger to take up a position at the University of Bucharest, which he held until he was ordered out of the country in 1943.

Babinger resumed his teaching career after the Second World War at the Ludwig-Maximilians-Universität München in 1948 until his retirement in 1958. In 1957, he testified about German atrocities against Romanian Jews. He was elected a member of the American Philosophical Society in 1964. He continued to work and publish actively until his death in Albania on 23 June 1967, the circumstances of which are unclear.

== Work ==
In addition to his bibliographical work, Babinger published numerous articles and books on a wide variety of subjects. Babinger knew Turkish, Romanian and Arabic as well as the principal European languages, giving his work a scope and authority that had hitherto rarely been displayed in Near Eastern studies.

As a result of his reputation, his magnum opus Mehmed the Conqueror was published without any accompanying notes on source material at all, since the companion volume outlining his extensive and voluminous sources was unfinished at the time of his death. As a result, Mehmed the Conqueror is one of the few academic works available with no cited sources and whose authority rests solely on the reputation of the author's research abilities. Prof. Halil Inalcik from the University of Ankara criticizes Babinger's overlook of Ottoman sources.

== Principal publications ==
Geschichtsschreiber der Osmanen und ihre Werke (1923)
Mehmed der Eroberer und seine Zeit (1953)
