= 1410 =

1410 in various calendars
- Gregorian calendar: 1410; MCDX
- Ab urbe condita: 2163
- Armenian calendar: 859; ԹՎ ՊԾԹ
- Assyrian calendar: 6160
- Balinese saka calendar: 1331–1332
- Bengali calendar: 816–817
- Berber calendar: 2360
- English Regnal year: 11 Hen. 4 – 12 Hen. 4
- Buddhist calendar: 1954
- Burmese calendar: 772
- Byzantine calendar: 6918–6919
- Chinese calendar: 己丑年 (Earth Ox); 4107 or 3900 — to — 庚寅年 (Metal Tiger); 4108 or 3901
- Coptic calendar: 1126–1127
- Discordian calendar: 2576
- Ethiopian calendar: 1402–1403
- Hebrew calendar: 5170–5171
- Hindu calendars
- Vikram Samvat: 1466–1467
- Shaka Samvat: 1331–1332
- Kali Yuga: 4510–4511
- Holocene calendar: 11410
- Igbo calendar: 410–411
- Iranian calendar: 788–789
- Islamic calendar: 812–813
- Japanese calendar: Ōei 17 (応永１７年)
- Javanese calendar: 1324–1325
- Julian calendar: 1410; MCDX
- Korean calendar: 3743
- Minguo calendar: 502 before ROC 民前502年
- Nanakshahi calendar: −58
- Thai solar calendar: 1952–1953
- Tibetan calendar: ས་མོ་གླང་ལོ་ (female Earth-Ox); 1536 or 1155 or 383 — to — ལྕགས་ཕོ་སྟག་ལོ་ (male Iron-Tiger); 1537 or 1156 or 384

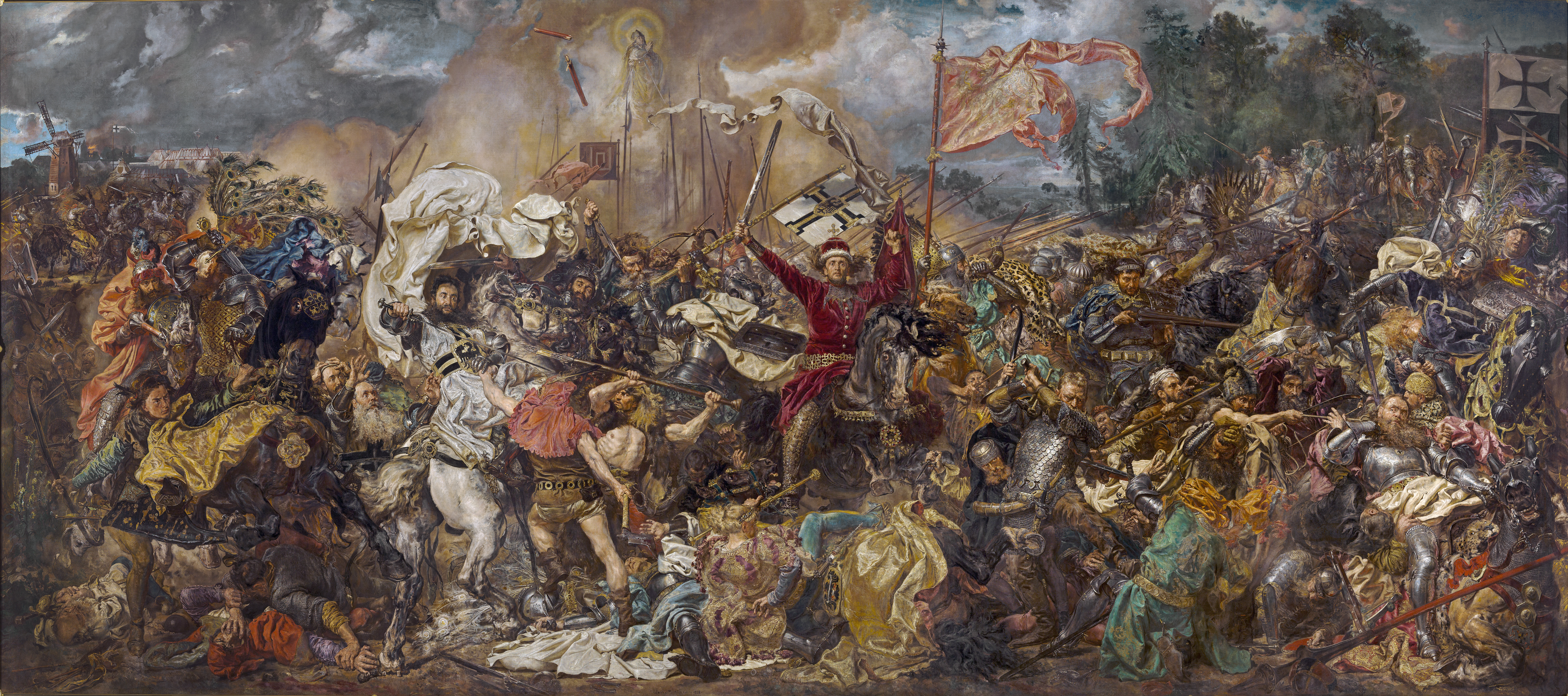
July 15: The Teutonic Knights are defeated by the Polish and Lithuanian armies at the Battle of Grunwald.

Year 1410 (MCDX) was a common year starting on Wednesday of the Julian calendar.

== Events ==
=== January–March ===
- January 27 – The 8th Parliament of King Henry IV of England is opened, with Thomas Chaucer as Speaker of the House of Commons.
- January 31 – Thomas Beaufort, Duke of Exeter becomes the new Lord Chancellor of England.
- February 26 – A papal bull is issued from Avignon by the Antipope Benedict XIII for Joan Gilabert Jofré to create the Hospital dels Ignoscents, the world's first hospital for the treatment of mental illness.
- March 25 – The first of the Yongle Emperor's campaigns against the Mongols is launched by the Emperor Cheng Zu, as at least 100,000 soldiers depart from Beijing on a mission to depose Öljei Temür Khan.
- March 29 – The Aragonese capture Oristano, capital of the Giudicato di Arborea in Sardinia.

=== April–June ===
- April 15 – At the wedding in Gien of Charles, Duke of Orléans to Bonne of Armagnac, the most powerful nobles of France form the League of Gien, joining forces to fight the Duke of Burgundy, John the Fearless, beginning a civil war that will last for 30 years.
- May 9 – The English Parliament closes its session for the year, and royal assent is given by King Henry IV to various acts, including the Sealing of Cloths Act 1409 and the Unlawful Games Act.
- May 17 – At Pisa, Cardinal Baldasare Cossa is elected by members of the Council of Pisa as the successor to the "antipope" Alexander V, who had died on May 4. On May 25, Cossa takes the name "John XXIII", a name that will be used more than 500 years later in 1958 when Angelo Giuseppe Roncalli is crowned as Pope John XXIII.
- May 18 – The death of Rupert, King of the Romans, Elector of Palatine and ruler of Germany, creates a conflict over who will be the successor to the German throne. Rupert's son becomes the new Louis III, Elector Palatine as Ludwig III.
- May 19 – During his campaign against the Eastern Mongols, China's Emperor Cheng Zu stops with his troops at Minluanshu and orders the carving of an inscription on rocks at the north bank of the Kerulen river, declaring "In the eighth year of the Yongle geng yin, fourth month ding you, sixteenth day ren zi, the Emperor of the Great Ming passed here with six armies during the punitive expedition against the barbarian robbers."
- May 31 – King Martin I of Aragon (who is also King Martin II of Sicily) dies at the age of 53, leaving a question of who his successor will be, and five contenders for the thrones of both nations argue until the crown is awarded to Martin's nephew, Ferdinand, in 1412.
- June 15 –
  - At the Onon River, the Chinese Army, under the command of the Emperor Cheng Zu, annihilates the Mongol forces of the Khagan Öljei Temür Khan, also known as Bunyashiri. The Khagan escapes and the Chinese troops pursue Arughtai, chingsang of another branch of the Northern Yuan.
  - Ottoman Interregnum: Süleyman Çelebi, the Sultan of the Ottoman Empire, defeats his brother Musa Çelebi, at the Battle of Kosmidion outside of the Byzantine capital, Constantinople.

=== July–September ===
- July 11 – Ottoman Interregnum: Süleyman Çelebi defeats his brother Musa Çelebi outside the Ottoman capital, Edirne.
- July 15 – Battle of Grunwald (Žalgiris), also known as Battle of Tannenberg: Polish and Lithuanian forces under cousins Jogaila and Vytautas the Great decisively defeat the forces of the Teutonic Knights, whose power is broken.
- July 26 – The Siege of Marienburg (now Malbork in Poland), capital of the State of the Teutonic Order of the Teutonic Knights, begins with an attack by Poland and Lithuania with an army of 26,000 men against less than 5,000 Teutons.
- August 29 – The Duchy of Pomerania-Stargard is submitted by Bogislaw VIII, the Duke of Pomerania, to become a fiefdom within the Kingdom of Poland, led by King Wladyslaw II. In return, Bogislaw receives Lauenburg and Bütow Land as well as Człuchów, Biały Bór, Debrzno, Świdwin and Czarne.
- September 16 – After a siege of almost four months, the Muslim city of Antequera, located in what is now Andalusia in Spain, surrenders to the Crown of Castile and its army, commanded by Prince Ferdinand of Aragon.
- September 19 – After nearly two months of no progress against the defending Teutonic Knights, and the dissatisfaction of the Lithuanians and Poles in continuing a long-term conflict, the siege of Marienburg is lifted.
- September 20 – Following the death of Rupert, King of the Romans, on May 18, a council of three electors— Louis III, Elector Palatine; Werner von Falkenstein, Elector of Trier and Frederick I, Elector of Brandenburg, Burgrave of Nuremberg votes to elect King Sigismund of Hungary as the new King of the Romans and the informal "King of Germany". The rest of the electors of the Holy Roman Empire refuse to accept Sigismund.

=== October–December ===
- October 1 – A different set of electors— Friedrich III. von Saarwerden, Elector of Cologne; Johann II von Nassau, Elector of Mainz and Rudolf III, Elector of Saxony elects Jobst of Moravia as their choice for the King of the Romans. The conflict will remain unresolved for another four years.
- October 10 – The Polish-Lithuanian alliance defeats the Teutonic Knights in the Battle of Koronowo.
- October 10 – Euthymius II becomes the new Ecumenical Patriarch of Constantinople, leader of the Eastern Orthodox Church among Christians, after the death in August of the Patriarch Matthew I.
- November – For his services during the defense of Marienburg and Prussia, Heinrich von Plauen is chosen as the 27th Grand Master of the Teutonic Order.
- November 2 – A temporary halt to the Armagnac–Burgundian Civil War in France is reached with the signing of a truce at Bicêtre, near Paris.
- December 10 – The Teutonic Council, led by the Grand Master Heinrich von Plauen, and King Jogalia of Poland and Duke of Lithuania enter into a 32-day truce.

=== Date unknown ===
- Jan Hus is excommunicated by the Archbishop of Prague.
- Construction begins on Castle Woerden in the Netherlands.
- The Prague Astronomical Clock (also known as Prague Orloj) is built by Mikuláš of Kadaň and Jan Šindel in Prague, the capital of the Czech Republic.

== Births ==
- January 30 – William Calthorpe, English knight (d. 1494)
- July 14 – Arnold, Duke of Guelders, Duke of Guelders (1423–1465 and 1471–1473) (d. 1473)
- August 1 – John IV, Count of Nassau-Siegen (1442–1475) (d. 1475)
- date unknown
  - Masuccio Salernitano, Italian poet (d. 1475)
  - William Sinclair, 1st Earl of Caithness (d. 1484)
- probable
  - Johannes Ockeghem, Dutch composer (d. 1497)
  - Ólöf Loftsdóttir, politically active Icelandic woman (d. 1479)
  - Conrad Paumann, German organist and composer (d. 1473)
  - Vecchietta, Sienese painter, sculptor and architect (d. 1480)

== Deaths ==
- March 5 – Matthew of Kraków, Polish reformer (b. 1335)
- March 16 – John Beaufort, 1st Earl of Somerset (b. 1373)
- May 3 – Antipope Alexander V, (b. 1339)
- May 18 – Rupert of Germany, Count Palatine of the Rhine (b. 1352)
- May 31 – Martin of Aragon (b. 1356)
- July 15 – Ulrich von Jungingen, German Grand Master of the Teutonic Knights (in battle) (b. 1360)
- August – Matthew I of Constantinople
- August 10 – Louis II, Duke of Bourbon (b. 1337)
- date unknown
  - Margareta Dume, influential Swedish-Finnish noble
  - John Badby, English martyr
