= Siege of Constantinople (1411) =

1411 siege of Constantinople by the Ottoman Empire

- Part of the Byzantine–Ottoman wars and the Ottoman Interregnum
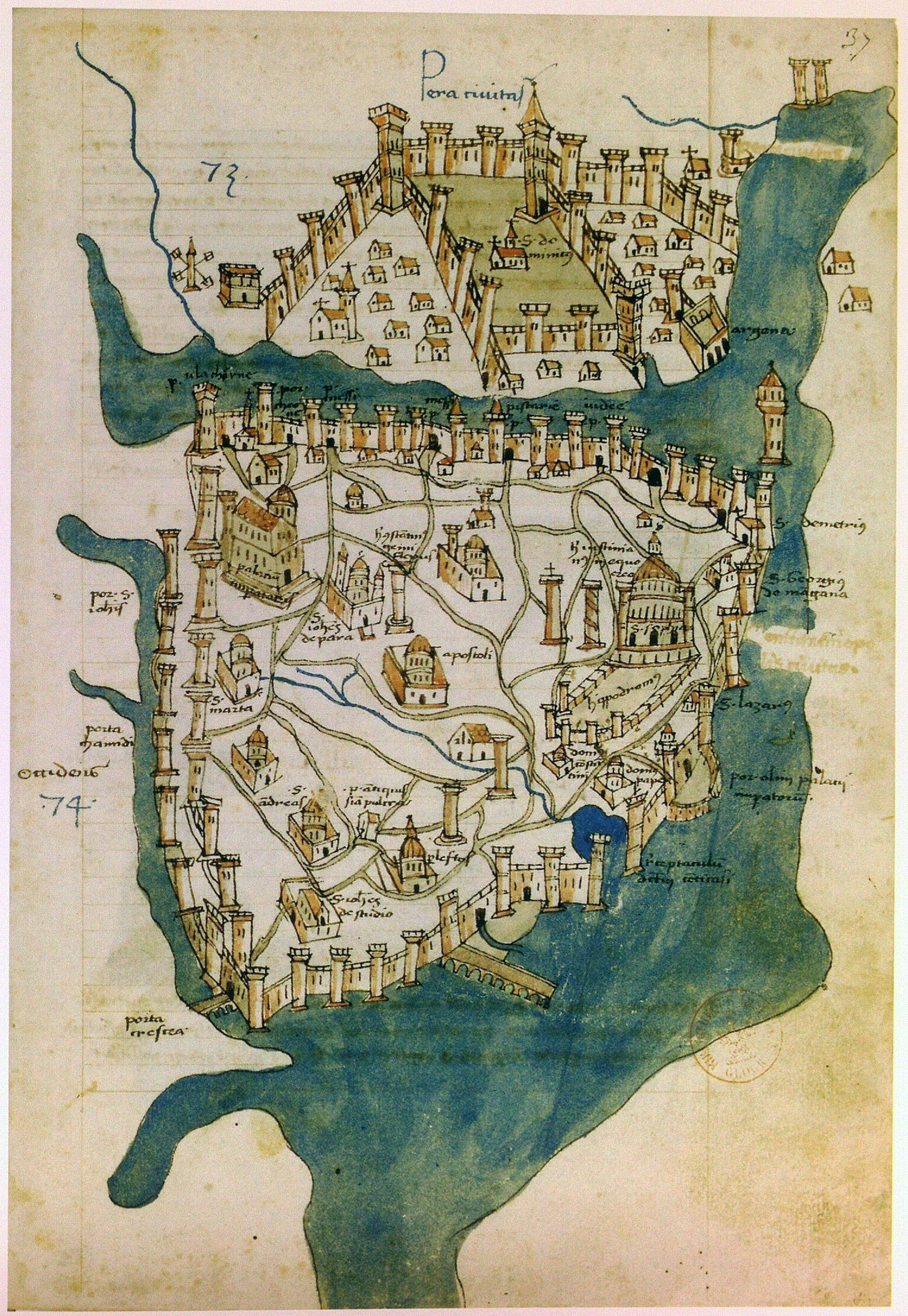
- Constantinople in 1422; the oldest surviving map of the city.
Date	1411
Location	Constantinople (modern-day Istanbul, Turkey) 41°00′44″N 28°58′34″E
Result	Byzantine victory; Siege lifted

Belligerents
Byzantine Empire	Ottoman Empire

Commanders and leaders
(Byzantine Empire) Manuel II Palaiologos	(Ottoman Empire) Musa Çelebi
- Location within Istanbul Siege of Constantinople (1411) (Mediterranean) Siege of Constantinople (1411) (Black Sea)

The siege of Constantinople of 1411 occurred during the Ottoman Interregnum, or Ottoman Civil War, (20 July 1402 – 5 July 1413), following the defeat of Sultan Bayezid I by the Central Asian warlord Timur. Although Mehmed Çelebi was confirmed as sultan by Timur after the Battle of Ankara, his brothers İsa Çelebi, Musa Çelebi, Süleyman Çelebi, and later, Mustafa Çelebi, refused to recognize his authority, each claiming the throne for himself. A civil war was the result. The Interregnum lasted until the Battle of Camurlu on 5 July 1413, when Mehmed Çelebi emerged as victor in the strife, crowned himself sultan Mehmed I, and restored peace to the empire.

== Background ==
Before the Battle of Ankara, the Byzantine Empire was a mere pawn of outside forces for several decades but after the defeat of the Ottomans by Timur, the Empire – for a short while – became a player in Ottoman domestic politics and intrigue. Sultan Bayezid conquered much territories in Europe and threatened Constantinople from all directions.

The Byzantine Emperor Manuel II Palaiologos supported Süleyman as claimant to the Ottoman throne. They signed the treaty of Gallipoli with the Byzantine regent John VII Palaiologos in 1403, as the emperor Manuel II Palaiologos was traveling in western Europe at the time. By this treaty, Süleyman gave up certain territories along the Marmara coast, as well as the major city of Thessaloniki to the Byzantine Empire in return for Byzantine support during the interregnum and declared himself sultan of the empire in Edirne, the capital in Rumeli of the Ottoman Empire. From the evidence presented above, it can be understood that the relationship between the Byzantine Empire and the Ottomans increased dramatically contemporarily.

Despite defeating his brother and rival for the Ottoman throne, Musa, at the Battle of Kosmidion in June 1410, Süleyman's popularity waned. So much so, that when Musa returned to avenge his defeat during the following year, Süleyman's supporters defected to Musa. Süleyman was captured while attempting to escape and was given to Musa's bodyguard, Koyun Musasi, and strangled to death on 17 February 1411.

== The siege ==
Musa found himself as the co-sultan of the European portion of the empire. Musa then retaliated against all who allied with Süleyman, including Manuel II, by briefly and fruitlessly laying siege to Constantinople in 1411. Manuel II turned to Mehmet for support, who betrayed Musa and set up a new alliance between himself and the Byzantines against Musa.

== Sources ==
- Imber, Colin (2002). The Ottoman Empire, 1300–1650: The Structure of Power (First ed.). Basingstoke: Palgrave Macmillan. ISBN 978-0-3336-1386-3.
- Kastritsis, Dimitris J. (2007). The Sons of Bayezid: Empire building and representation in the Ottoman Civil War of 1402-13. Brill.
- Ostrogorsky, G. (1969). History of the Byzantine State. Rutgers University Press.
