= Hungarian–Ottoman War (1415–1419) =

Fifth confrontation between the Kingdom of Hungary and the Ottoman Empire in the Balkans

- Part of Hungarian–Ottoman Wars
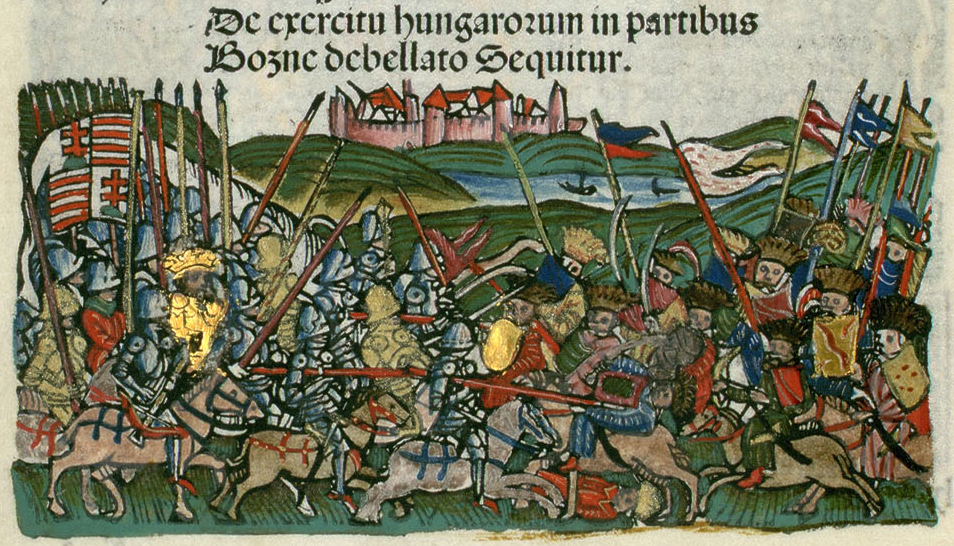
- The campaign of Hungarians against Bosnia during the reign of King Sigismund of Hungary
Date	1415–1419
Location	Doboj, Nicopolis, Balkans, Kingdom of Hungary, Kingdom of Bosnia
Result	Indecisive (Note: the Hungarian forces managed to defeat the Ottomans and repel their forces) (Note: Ottoman Empire strategically annexed small parts of Bosnia)
Territorial changes	Ottoman Empire annexes parts of Bosnia, Hungary reconquers Banate of Severin

Belligerents
Kingdom of Hungary; Kingdom of Croatia; Kingdom of Bosnia	Ottoman Empire; Hrvatinić Family

Commanders and leaders
Sigismund; János Garay; Nikola IV Frankopan (Kingdom of Bosnia) Sandalj Hranić	(Ottoman Empire) Mehmed I (Ottoman Empire) Ishak Bey; Hrvoje Vukčić Hrvatinić

Strength
Unknown	Unknown

The Hungarian–Ottoman War (1415–1419) was the fifth confrontation between the Kingdom of Hungary and the Ottoman Empire in the Balkans. The war ended indecisively. Despite initial defeat at Doboj, the Hungarian forces managed to defeat the Ottomans and repel their forces and the Turks strategically captured part of Bosnia where they organized a sanjak.

== Background ==
Sigismund of Luxembourg, after his narrow escape to his homeland, found himself confronted by fierce opposition from supporters of Ladislaus of Naples, notably led by Stephen II Lackfi and István Simontornyai. In Bosnia, Tvrtko II of Bosnia, emerged as a key figure, being the illegitimate son of Tvrtko I of Bosnia. Alongside him was Ostoja of Bosnia, a prominent noble in the southern region, who rallied the Bosnian nobility against Sigismund's authority. Amidst this turmoil, the Lackfi family hatched a complex plan, envisioning a marriage alliance between one of Bayezid's daughters and Ladislaus of Naples to counter Sigismund's influence. However, fate dealt both Bayezid and Sigismund separate blows. Bayezid suffered a devastating defeat and was captured in the pivotal Battle of Ankara in 1402, while Sigismund faced betrayal from his own nobles, leading to his imprisonment. Sigismund's eventual release in Bosnia was strategically aimed at consolidating his position against the encroaching Turkish threat. By the spring of 1408, Sigismund led a formidable army into Bosnia, a portion of which he dispatched to aid Serbian prince Stefan Lazarević in repelling the advances of the Rumelian emir Süleyman Çelebi. This intervention culminated in Süleyman Çelebi's defeat and demise at the hands of his own brother.

== War ==
The complicated dynamics of the Bayezid I dynasty provided a brief respite for Hungarians. With Bayezid's eldest son, Musa Çelebi, governing the European territories, and Mehmed I ruling the Asian domains, the Ottoman realm faced internal strife. Exploiting this instability, Queen Barbara of Cilli dispatched János Garay, János Maróthi, and Pált Csupor to bolster the Serbian despot. Simultaneously, Sigismund sought to reinforce Serbia's position by sending Sandalj Hranić. However, the situation escalated when Hrvoje Vukčić Hrvatinić, a Bosnian lord, backed by Musa's support, seized vulnerable territories belonging to Hranić. Mehmed's decisive incursion into Europe in 1413, buoyed by the defection of Serbian voivode Stefan, resulted in the unification of the Ottoman Empire under his rule after the victory at the Battle of Çamurlu over Musa.

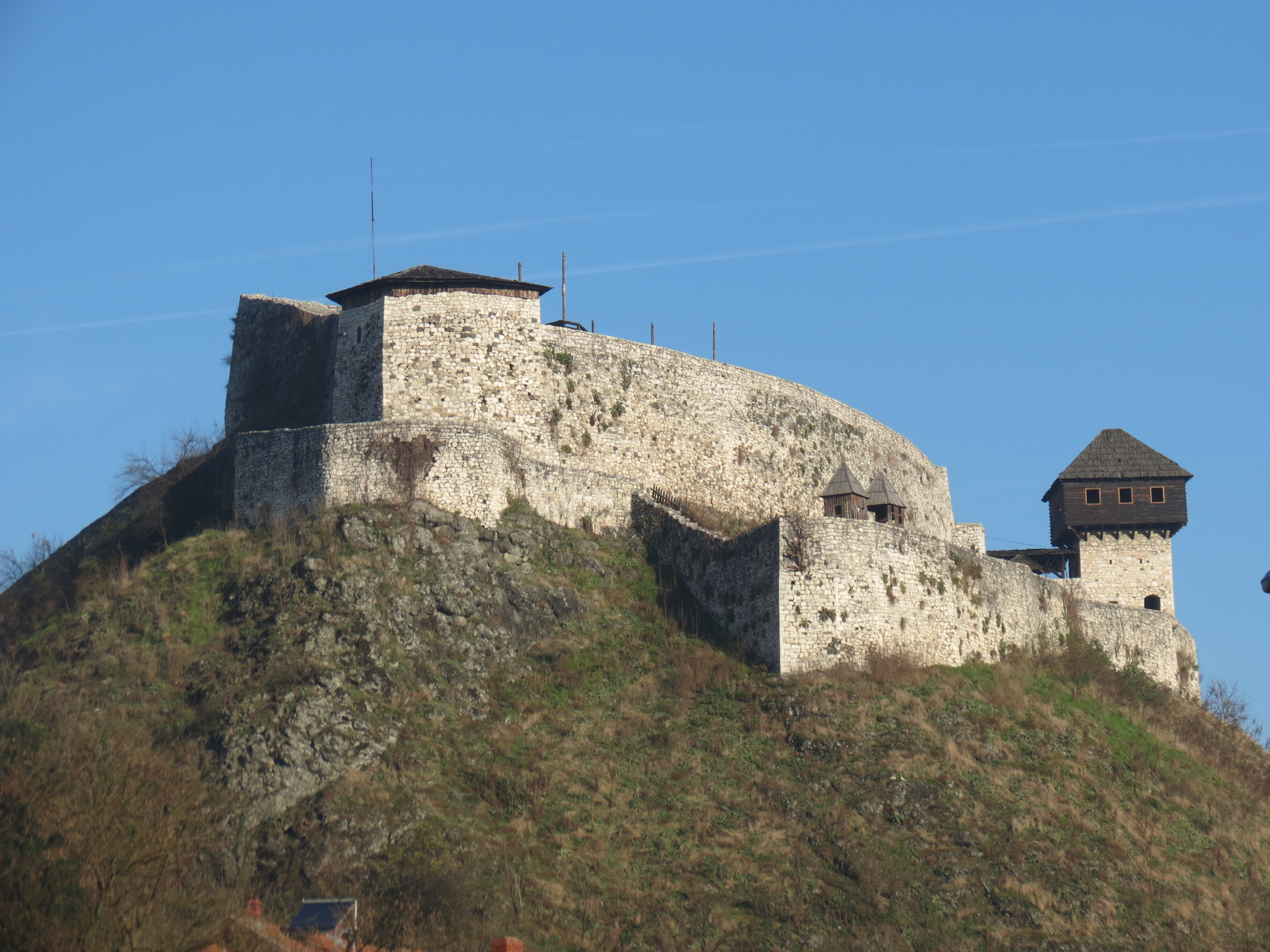
Doboj fortress

The year 1415 witnessed Mehmed's audacious assault on Kingdom of Hungary and Croatia, in collaboration with Hrvoje. Hungarian forces, led by János Maróthy, János Garay, and Pált Csupor, clashed with the Turkish-Slavic coalition in the Bosna Valley. The ensuing Battle of Doboj on August 6, 1415, marked a significant setback for Hungary as the cunning tactics of the Turkish-South Slavic forces led to the capture of the three Hungarian generals and the decimation of their army.

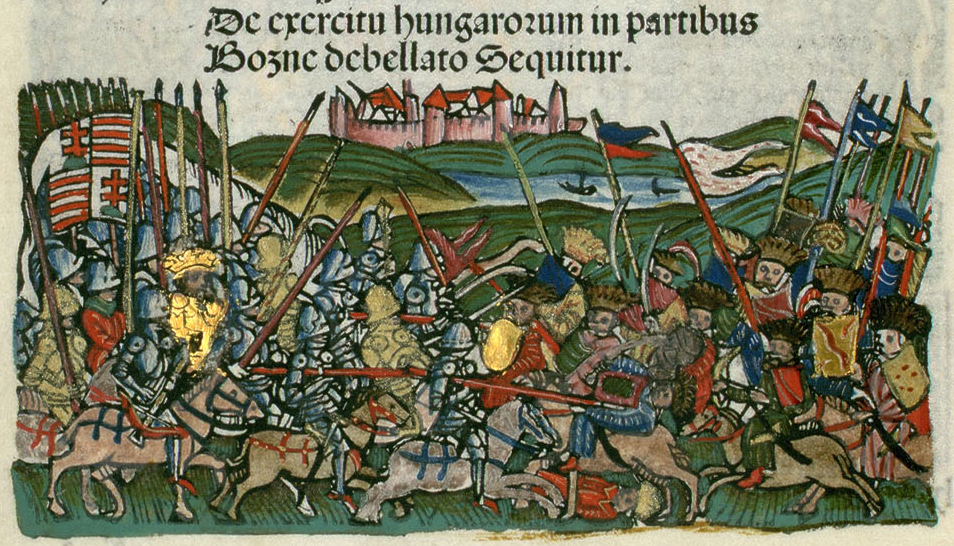
Hungarian campaign against Bosnia

Turkish raiding parties, emboldened by their victory, crossed the Sava River, wreaking havoc on Hungarian border regions and consolidating Turkish control in Bosnia. Sigismund's frantic efforts to contain the Turkish advance saw him dispatch reinforcements and seek aid from neighboring powers like King Władysław II Jagiełło of Poland and Prince Vytautas of Lithuania, albeit with limited success.

With the conclusion of peace negotiations with Venice in 1416, Sultan Mehmed turned his attention towards expanding into Wallachia. Mircea the Elder, navigating internal strife, ultimately yielded to Mehmed's demands, setting the stage for Ottoman expansion into the region. Mehmed, leveraging his forces from Bosnia, initiated multiple campaigns, including battle of Radkersburg in Styria led by Ahmed Beg. However, the Ottoman advance encountered fierce resistance, notably from Nikola IV Frankopan and other defenders, resulting in a decisive victory for the Hungarian-led forces.

== Aftermath ==
Concurrently, another Turkish force, commanded by the Bosnian Isa Bey Ishaković, attempted an incursion into Timișoara but was thwarted by Miklós Péterfy of Macedonia. Sigismund's active stance against the Turkish threat in 1419 saw him leading a campaign, possibly in support of Mircea in Wallachia or in defense of strategic points like Nicopolis or Nis, reconquering the Banate of Severin from the Ottomans. Sigismund's military initiatives included the construction of Görény Castle and other fortifications along the Lower Danube to safeguard the Banate of Severin. Amidst these developments, Tvrtko II of Bosnia reclaimed his kingship in northern Bosnia, signifying a resurgence of local authority. The year 1419 also witnessed peace negotiations between Sultan Mehmed I and Hungary, offering a temporary reprieve from the ongoing hostilities.

== See also ==
- Sigismund of Luxembourg
- Battle of Çamurlu
- Hungarian–Ottoman War (1389–1396)
- Hungarian–Ottoman War (1375–1377)

== Sources ==
- Caesar Aquilin Julius, Staats- und Kirchengeschichte des Herzogtums Steiermak, at Aschbach ISBN 9783742820310
- Klaus Schwarz: Vom Krieg zum Frieden – Berlin, das Kurfürstentum Brandenburg, das Reich und die Türken. In: Georeon Sievernich (Hrsg.): Europa und der Orient 800-1900, Bertelsmann Lexikon Verlag, Berlin 1989 ISBN 3570050769
- Oliver Jens Schmitt, Handbuch zur Geschichte Südosteuropas, Band 2 (Herrschaft und Politik in Südosteuropa von 1300 bis 1800), De Gruyter, Berlin 2021 ISBN 3110743949
