= July 11 =

July 11 this year in various calendars
- Saturday, 11 July 2026
Akan	Nwonamemene
Armenian	26 Hrotich 1475
Aztec	Quecholli 2, 1 Itzcuintli
Babylonian	25 Simanu, 2337 SE
Balinese pawukon	Luang, Pepet, Beteng, Menala, Wage, Aryang, Saniscara of Medangsia, Uma, Ogan, Duka
Bengali	27 Asharh, BS 1433
Chinese	Yang Fire Dog・Stomach Mansion; Fire Horse Year, Month 5, Day 27 (Xiaoshu, 12 days until Dashu)
Common Era	11 July 2026 CE
Coptic	4 Epip, AM 1742
Egyptian	26 Athyr, 2775 NE
Ethiopian	4 Ḥamlē, 2018 Amätä Məhrät
French Republican	Décade III, Tridi de Messidor de l'Année 234 de la République
Gregorian	11 July, AD 2026
Hebrew	26 Tamuz, AM 5786
Hindu	Kṛttikā・Śūla; Solar: 27 Āṣāḍha, 1948 SE; Lunisolar: Dvādaśī, Kṛishna pakṣa of Jyeṣṭha, 2083 VE; Rāudra・5127 KY・1,872,767
Icelandic	Laugardagur, 20 Sólmánuður 2026
Islamic	25 Muharram, AH 1448 (using tabular method)
ISO week date	2026-W28-6
Japanese	27 Satsuki, Reiwa 8 (Shōsho, 12 days until Taisho)
Julian	28 June, AD 2026 (AM 7534)
Julian day	2461233
Korean	27 Maldal, 4359 DE
Maya	13.0.13.13.10; 3 Xul, 1 Oc
Roman	ante diem IV Kalendas Iulias, MMDCCLXXIX AUC
Solar Hijri	20 Tir, SH 1405
Tibetan	27 snron, me pho rta 2153 or 1772 or 1000

<<	July					>>
Su	Mo	Tu	We	Th	Fr	Sa
			1	2	3	4
5	6	7	8	9	10	11
12	13	14	15	16	17	18
19	20	21	22	23	24	25
26	27	28	29	30	31
2026

July 11 in recent years
2026 (Saturday)
2025 (Friday)
2024 (Thursday)
2023 (Tuesday)
2022 (Monday)
2021 (Sunday)
2020 (Saturday)
2019 (Thursday)
2018 (Wednesday)
2017 (Tuesday)

July 11 is the 192nd day of the year (193rd in leap years) in the Gregorian calendar; 173 days remain until the end of the year.

== Events ==
=== Pre-1600 ===
- 472 – Western Roman Emperor Anthemius is killed by troops of the Roman Gothic general Ricimer.
- 813 – Byzantine emperor Michael I, under threat by conspiracies, abdicates in favor of his general Leo the Armenian, and becomes a monk (under the name Athanasius).
- 911 – Signing of the Treaty of Saint-Clair-sur-Epte between Charles the Simple and Rollo of Normandy.
- 1174 – Baldwin IV, 13, becomes King of Jerusalem, with Raymond III of Tripoli as regent and William of Tyre as chancellor.
- 1276 – Election of pope Adrian V under the influence of Charles I of Anjou following the death of pope Gregory X earlier that year. Adrian V dies the following month.
- 1302 – Battle of the Golden Spurs (Guldensporenslag in Dutch): A coalition around the Flemish cities defeats the king of France's royal army.
- 1346 – Charles IV, Count of Luxembourg and King of Bohemia, is elected King of the Romans.
- 1405 – Ming admiral Zheng He sets sail to explore the world for the first time.
- 1410 – Ottoman Interregnum: Süleyman Çelebi defeats his brother Musa Çelebi outside the Ottoman capital, Edirne.
- 1476 – Giuliano della Rovere is appointed bishop of Coutances.
- 1576 – While exploring the North Atlantic Ocean in an attempt to find the Northwest Passage, Martin Frobisher sights Greenland, mistaking it for the hypothesized (but non-existent) island of "Frisland".

=== 1601–1900 ===
- 1616 – Samuel de Champlain returns to Quebec.
- 1708 – A coalition army of Dutch, English and German troops under the duke of Marlborough defeats a French army under the duke of Burgundy and the Marshal Vendome in the battle of Oudenarde.
- 1735 – Mathematical calculations suggest that it is on this day that dwarf planet Pluto moved inside the orbit of Neptune for the last time before 1979.
- 1789 – Jacques Necker is dismissed as France's Finance Minister sparking the Storming of the Bastille.
- 1796 – The United States takes possession of Detroit from Great Britain under terms of the Jay Treaty.
- 1798 – The United States Marine Corps is re-established; they had been disbanded after the American Revolutionary War.
- 1801 – French astronomer Jean-Louis Pons makes his first comet discovery. In the next 27 years he discovers another 36 comets, more than any other person in history.
- 1804 – A duel occurs in which the Vice President of the United States Aaron Burr mortally wounds former Secretary of the Treasury Alexander Hamilton.
- 1833 – Noongar Australian aboriginal warrior Yagan, wanted for the murder of white colonists in Western Australia, is killed.
- 1836 – The Fly-fisher's Entomology is published by Alfred Ronalds. The book transformed the sport and went to many editions.
- 1848 – Waterloo railway station in London opens.
- 1864 – American Civil War: Battle of Fort Stevens; Confederate forces attempt to invade Washington, D.C.
- 1882 – The British Mediterranean Fleet begins the Bombardment of Alexandria in Egypt as part of the Anglo-Egyptian War.
- 1889 – Tijuana, Mexico, is founded.
- 1893 – The first cultured pearl is obtained by Kōkichi Mikimoto.
- 1893 – A revolution led by the liberal general and politician José Santos Zelaya takes over state power in Nicaragua.
- 1897 – Salomon August Andrée leaves Spitsbergen to attempt to reach the North Pole by balloon.
- 1899 – Fiat founded by Giovanni Agnelli in Turin, Italy.

=== 1901–present ===
- 1906 – Murder of Grace Brown by Chester Gillette in the United States, inspiration for Theodore Dreiser's An American Tragedy.
- 1914 – Babe Ruth makes his debut in Major League Baseball.
- 1914 – The US Navy launches the USS Nevada (BB-36) as its first standard-type battleship.
- 1919 – The eight-hour day and free Sunday become law for workers in the Netherlands.
- 1920 – In the East Prussian plebiscite the local populace decides to remain with Weimar Germany.
- 1921 – A truce in the Irish War of Independence comes into effect.
- 1921 – The Red Army captures Mongolia from the White Army and establishes the Mongolian People's Republic.
- 1921 – Former president of the United States William Howard Taft is sworn in as 10th chief justice of the U.S. Supreme Court, becoming the only person ever to hold both offices.
- 1922 – The Hollywood Bowl opens.
- 1924 – Eric Liddell wins the gold medal in 400m at the 1924 Paris Olympics, after refusing to run in the heats for 100m, his favoured distance, on a Sunday.
- 1934 – Engelbert Zaschka of Germany flies his large human-powered aircraft, the Zaschka Human-Power Aircraft, about 20 meters at Berlin Tempelhof Airport without assisted take-off.
- 1936 – The Triborough Bridge in New York City is opened to traffic.
- 1940 – World War II: Vichy France regime is formally established. Philippe Pétain becomes Chief of the French State.
- 1941 – The Northern Rhodesian Labour Party holds its first congress in Nkana.
- 1943 – Massacres of Poles in Volhynia and Eastern Galicia by the Ukrainian Insurgent Army within the Reichskommissariat Ukraine (Volhynia) peak.
- 1943 – World War II: Allied invasion of Sicily: German and Italian troops launch a counter-attack on Allied forces in Sicily.
- 1947 – The Exodus 1947 heads to Palestine from France.
- 1950 – Pakistan joins the International Monetary Fund and the International Bank.
- 1957 – Prince Karim Husseini Aga Khan IV inherits the office of Imamat as the 49th Imam of Shia Imami Ismai'li worldwide, after the death of Sir Sultan Mahommed Shah Aga Khan III.
- 1960 – France legislates for the independence of Dahomey (later Benin), Upper Volta (later Burkina Faso) and Niger.
- 1960 – Congo Crisis: The State of Katanga breaks away from the Democratic Republic of the Congo.
- 1960 – To Kill a Mockingbird by Harper Lee is first published, in the United States.
- 1962 – First transatlantic satellite television transmission.
- 1962 – Project Apollo: At a press conference, NASA announces lunar orbit rendezvous as the means to land astronauts on the Moon, and return them to Earth.
- 1971 – The nationalization of all large copper mines in Chile is completed.
- 1972 – The first game of the World Chess Championship 1972 between challenger Bobby Fischer and defending champion Boris Spassky starts.
- 1973 – Varig Flight 820 crashes near Paris on approach to Orly Airport, killing 123 of the 134 on board. In response, the FAA bans smoking in airplane lavatories.
- 1977 – Martin Luther King Jr., assassinated in 1968, is posthumously awarded the Presidential Medal of Freedom.
- 1978 – Los Alfaques disaster: A truck carrying liquid gas crashes and explodes at a coastal campsite in Tarragona, Spain, killing 216 tourists.
- 1979 – America's first space station, Skylab, is destroyed as it re-enters the Earth's atmosphere over the Indian Ocean.
- 1982 – Italy defeats West Germany 3–1 to win the FIFA World Cup.
- 1983 – A TAME airline Boeing 737-200 crashes near Cuenca, Ecuador, killing all 119 passengers and crew on board.
- 1990 – Oka Crisis: First Nations land dispute in Quebec begins.
- 1991 – Nigeria Airways Flight 2120 crashes in Jeddah, Saudi Arabia, killing all 261 passengers and crew on board.
- 1995 – Yugoslav Wars: Srebrenica massacre begins, lasting until 22 July.
- 2006 – Mumbai train bombings: 209 people are killed in a series of bomb attacks in Mumbai, India.
- 2007 – The Siege of Lal Masjid in Islamabad, Pakistan, ends after the Pakistan Army storms the mosque which had been occupied by Islamist militants.
- 2010 – The Islamist militia group Al-Shabaab carries out multiple suicide bombings in Kampala, Uganda, killing 74 people and injuring 85 others.
- 2010 – In Johannesburg, Spain defeat the Netherlands 1–0 after extra time to win their first FIFA World Cup title.
- 2011 – Ninety-eight containers of explosives self-detonate killing 13 people in Zygi, Cyprus.
- 2015 – Joaquín "El Chapo" Guzmán escapes from the maximum security Altiplano prison in Mexico, his second escape.
- 2021 – Virgin Galactic launches its founder, Richard Branson, into space, the first company ever to do so.

== Births ==
=== Pre-1600 ===
- 154 – Bardaisan, Syrian astrologer, scholar, and philosopher (died 222)
- 1274 – Robert the Bruce, Scottish king (died 1329)
- 1406 – William, Margrave of Hachberg-Sausenberg (died 1482)
- 1459 – Kaspar, Count Palatine of Zweibrücken, German nobleman (died 1527)
- 1558 – Robert Greene, English author and playwright (died 1592)
- 1561 – Luis de Góngora, Spanish cleric and poet (died 1627)

=== 1601–1900 ===
- 1603 – Kenelm Digby, English astrologer, courtier, and diplomat (died 1665)
- 1628 – Tokugawa Mitsukuni, Japanese daimyō (died 1701)
- 1653 – Sarah Good, American woman accused of witchcraft (died 1692)
- 1657 – Frederick I of Prussia (died 1713)
- 1662 – Maximilian II Emanuel, Elector of Bavaria (died 1726)
- 1709 – Johan Gottschalk Wallerius, Swedish chemist and mineralogist (died 1785)
- 1723 – Jean-François Marmontel, French historian and author (died 1799)
- 1754 – Thomas Bowdler, English physician and philanthropist (died 1825)
- 1760 – Peggy Shippen, American wife of Benedict Arnold and American Revolutionary War spy (died 1804)
- 1767 – John Quincy Adams, American lawyer and politician, 6th President of the United States (died 1848)
- 1811 – William Robert Grove, Welsh physicist and inventor of the first fuel cell (died 1896)
- 1826 – Alexander Afanasyev, Russian ethnographer and author (died 1871)
- 1832 – Charilaos Trikoupis, Greek lawyer and politician, 55th Prime Minister of Greece (died 1896)
- 1834 – James McNeill Whistler, American-English painter and illustrator (died 1903)
- 1836 – Antônio Carlos Gomes, Brazilian composer (died 1896)
- 1846 – Léon Bloy, French author and poet (died 1917)
- 1849 – N. E. Brown, English plant taxonomist and authority on succulents (died 1934)
- 1850 – Annie Armstrong, American missionary (died 1938)
- 1866 – Princess Irene of Hesse and by Rhine (died 1953)
- 1875 – H. M. Brock, British painter and illustrator (died 1960)
- 1880 – Friedrich Lahrs, German architect and academic (died 1964)
- 1881 – Isabel Martin Lewis, American astronomer and author (died 1966)
- 1882 – James Larkin White, American miner, explorer, and park ranger (died 1946)
- 1886 – Boris Grigoriev, Russian painter and illustrator (died 1939)
- 1888 – Carl Schmitt, German philosopher and jurist (died 1985)
- 1892 – Thomas Mitchell, American actor, singer, and screenwriter (died 1962)
- 1894 – Erna Mohr, German zoologist (died 1968)
- 1895 – Dorothy Wilde, English author and poet (died 1941)
- 1897 – Bull Connor, American police officer (died 1973)
- 1899 – Wilfrid Israel, German businessman and philanthropist (died 1943)
- 1899 – E. B. White, American essayist and journalist (died 1985)

=== 1901–present ===
- 1901 – Gwendolyn Lizarraga, Belizean businesswoman, activist, and politician (died 1975)
- 1902 – Samuel Goudsmit, Dutch-American physicist (formulated concept of electron spin) (died 1978)
- 1903 – Rudolf Abel, English-Russian colonel and Soviet spy (died 1971)
- 1903 – Sidney Franklin, American bullfighter (died 1976)
- 1904 – Niño Ricardo, Spanish guitarist and composer (died 1972)
- 1905 – Betty Allan, Australian statistician and biometrician (died 1952)
- 1906 – Herbert Wehner, German politician, Minister of Intra-German Relations (died 1990)
- 1909 – Irene Hervey, American actress (died 1998)
- 1909 – Jacques Clemens, Dutch catholic priest (died 2018)
- 1910 – Sally Blane, American actress (died 1997)
- 1911 – Erna Flegel, German nurse who was still present in the Führerbunker when it was captured by Soviet troops (died 2006)
- 1913 – Cordwainer Smith, American sinologist, author, and academic (died 1966)
- 1915 – Leonard Goodwin, British protozoologist (died 2008)
- 1916 – Mortimer Caplin, American tax attorney, educator, and IRS Commissioner (died 2019)
- 1916 – Hans Maier, Dutch water polo player (died 2018)
- 1916 – Alexander Prokhorov, Australian-Russian physicist and academic, Nobel Prize laureate (died 2002)
- 1916 – Gough Whitlam, Australian lawyer, and politician, 21st Prime Minister of Australia (died 2014)
- 1918 – Venetia Burney, English educator, who named Pluto (died 2009)
- 1918 – Roy Krenkel, American illustrator (died 1983)
- 1920 – Yul Brynner, Russian-American actor and dancer (died 1985)
- 1920 – Zecharia Sitchin, Russian-American author (died 2010)
- 1922 – Gene Evans, American actor (died 1998)
- 1922 – Fritz Riess, German-Swiss racing driver (died 1991)
- 1923 – Richard Pipes, Polish-American historian and academic (died 2018)
- 1923 – Tun Tun, Indian actress and comedian (died 2003)
- 1924 – César Lattes, Brazilian physicist and academic (died 2005)
- 1924 – Brett Somers, Canadian-American actress and singer (died 2007)
- 1924 – Charlie Tully, Northern Irish footballer and manager (died 1971)
- 1925 – Charles Chaynes, French composer (died 2016)
- 1925 – Nicolai Gedda, Swedish operatic tenor (died 2017)
- 1925 – Peter Kyros, American lawyer and politician (died 2012)
- 1925 – Sid Smith, Canadian ice hockey player and coach (died 2004)
- 1926 – Frederick Buechner, American minister, theologian, and author (died 2022)
- 1927 – Theodore Maiman, American-Canadian physicist and engineer (died 2007)
- 1927 – Chris Leonard, English footballer (died 1987)
- 1927 – Herbert Blomstedt, Swedish conductor (died 2026)
- 1928 – Frank Rosenblatt, Psychologist and Computer Scientist, AI pioneer (died 1971)
- 1928 – Andrea Veneracion, Filipina choirmaster (died 2014)
- 1929 – David Kelly, Irish actor (died 2012)
- 1930 – Jack Alabaster, New Zealand cricketer (died 2024)
- 1930 – Harold Bloom, American literary critic (died 2019)
- 1930 – Mike Foster, American politician, 53rd Governor of Louisiana (died 2020)
- 1930 – Ezra Vogel, American sociologist (died 2020)
- 1931 – Tab Hunter, American actor and singer (died 2018)
- 1931 – Tullio Regge, Italian physicist and academic (died 2014)
- 1932 – Jean-Guy Talbot, Canadian ice hockey player and coach (died 2024)
- 1932 – Ron Stewart, Canadian ice hockey player (died 2012)
- 1933 – Jim Carlen, American football player and coach (died 2012)
- 1933 – Frank Kelso, American admiral and politician, United States Secretary of the Navy (died 2013)
- 1934 – Giorgio Armani, Italian fashion designer, founded the Armani Company (died 2025)
- 1934 – Clark R. Rasmussen, American politician (died 2024)
- 1935 – Frederick Hemke, American saxophonist and educator (died 2019)
- 1935 – Oliver Napier, Northern Irish lawyer and politician (died 2011)
- 1937 – Pai Hsien-yung, Chinese-Taiwanese author
- 1941 – Bill Boggs, American journalist and producer
- 1941 – Henry Lowther, English trumpet player
- 1942 – Darrell Eastlake, Australian sportscaster (died 2018)
- 1943 – Richard Carleton, Australian journalist and television host (died 2006)
- 1943 – Howard Gardner, American psychologist and academic
- 1943 – Tom Holland, American actor, director, and screenwriter
- 1943 – Robert Malval, Haitian businessman and politician, 5th Prime Minister of Haiti
- 1943 – Rolf Stommelen, German racing driver (died 1983)
- 1944 – Lou Hudson, American basketball player and coach (died 2014)
- 1944 – Patricia Polacco, American author and illustrator
- 1947 – Jeff Hanna, American singer-songwriter, guitarist, and drummer
- 1947 – Bo Lundgren, Swedish politician
- 1950 – Jim Higgs, Australian cricketer
- 1950 – Pervez Hoodbhoy, Pakistani physicist and academic
- 1950 – Bonnie Pointer, American singer (died 2020)
- 1951 – Ed Ott, American baseball player and coach (died 2024)
- 1952 – Bill Barber, Canadian ice hockey player and coach
- 1952 – Stephen Lang, American actor and playwright
- 1953 – Piyasvasti Amranand, Thai businessman and politician, Thai Minister of Energy
- 1953 – Angélica Aragón, Mexican film, television, and stage actress and singer
- 1953 – Suresh Prabhu, Indian accountant and politician, Indian Minister of Railways
- 1953 – Patricia Reyes Spíndola, Mexican actress, director, and producer
- 1953 – Leon Spinks, American boxer (died 2021)
- 1953 – Mindy Sterling, American actress
- 1955 – Balaji Sadasivan, Singaporean neurosurgeon and politician, Singaporean Minister of Health (died 2010)
- 1956 – Amitav Ghosh, Indian-American author and academic
- 1956 – Robin Renucci, French actor and director
- 1956 – Sela Ward, American actress
- 1957 – Peter Murphy, English singer-songwriter
- 1957 – Patsy O'Hara, Irish Republican hunger striker (died 1981)
- 1957 – Michael Rose, Jamaican singer-songwriter
- 1958 – Stephanie Dabney, American ballerina (died 2022)
- 1958 – Mark Lester, English actor
- 1958 – Hugo Sánchez, Mexican footballer, coach, and manager
- 1959 – Richie Sambora, American singer-songwriter, guitarist, and producer
- 1959 – Suzanne Vega, American singer-songwriter, guitarist, and producer
- 1960 – David Baerwald, American singer-songwriter, composer, and musician
- 1962 – Gaétan Duchesne, Canadian ice hockey player (died 2007)
- 1962 – Pauline McLynn, Irish actress and author
- 1962 – Fumiya Fujii, Japanese music artist
- 1963 – Al MacInnis, Canadian ice hockey player and coach
- 1963 – Dean Richards, English rugby player and coach
- 1963 – Lisa Rinna, American actress and talk show host
- 1964 – Craig Charles, English actor and TV presenter
- 1965 – Tony Cottee, English footballer, manager, and sportscaster
- 1965 – Ernesto Hoost, Dutch kick-boxer and sportscaster
- 1965 – Scott Shriner, American singer-songwriter and bass player
- 1966 – Nadeem Aslam, Pakistani-English author
- 1966 – Kentaro Miura, Japanese author and illustrator (died 2021)
- 1966 – Mick Molloy, Australian radio and television host and actor
- 1966 – Rod Strickland, American basketball player and coach
- 1966 – Ricky Warwick, Northern Irish musician
- 1967 – Jhumpa Lahiri, Indian American novelist and short story writer
- 1968 – Daniel MacMaster, Canadian singer-songwriter (died 2008)
- 1969 – Ned Boulting, British sports journalist and television presenter
- 1970 – Justin Chambers, American actor
- 1971 – Leisha Hailey, American singer-songwriter and actress
- 1971 – Scott Muller, Australian cricketer
- 1972 – Cormac Battle, English-Irish singer-songwriter, guitarist, and producer
- 1972 – Michael Rosenbaum, American actor
- 1973 – Andrew Bird, American indie rock singer-songwriter and violinist
- 1973 – Konstantinos Kenteris, Greek runner
- 1974 – Alanas Chošnau, Lithuanian singer-songwriter
- 1974 – Hermann Hreiðarsson, Icelandic footballer and manager
- 1974 – André Ooijer, Dutch footballer and coach
- 1974 – Lil' Kim, American rapper and producer
- 1975 – Rubén Baraja, Spanish footballer and manager
- 1975 – Spencer Cox, American politician, 18th Governor of Utah
- 1976 – Eduardo Nájera, Mexican-American basketball player and coach
- 1978 – Kathleen Edwards, Canadian singer-songwriter and guitarist
- 1978 – Massimiliano Rosolino, Italian swimmer
- 1979 – Raio Piiroja, Estonian footballer
- 1980 – Tyson Kidd, Canadian wrestler
- 1981 – Andre Johnson, American football player
- 1981 – Susana Barreiros, Venezuelan judge
- 1983 – Engin Baytar, German-Turkish footballer
- 1983 – Peter Cincotti, American singer-songwriter and pianist
- 1983 – Marie Serneholt, Swedish singer and dancer
- 1984 – Yorman Bazardo, Venezuelan baseball player
- 1984 – Tanith Belbin, Canadian-American ice dancer
- 1984 – Jacoby Jones, American football player (died 2024)
- 1984 – Joe Pavelski, American ice hockey player
- 1984 – Morné Steyn, South African rugby player
- 1985 – Robert Adamson, American actor, director, and producer
- 1985 – Orestis Karnezis, Greek footballer
- 1986 – Raúl García, Spanish footballer
- 1986 – Yoann Gourcuff, French footballer
- 1987 – Shigeaki Kato, Japanese singer
- 1988 – Étienne Capoue, French footballer
- 1988 – Natalie La Rose, Dutch singer, songwriter and dancer
- 1989 – Tobias Sana, Swedish footballer
- 1989 – Travis Waddell, Australian rugby league player
- 1989 – Shimanoumi Koyo, Japanese sumo wrestler
- 1990 – Mona Barthel, German tennis player
- 1990 – Connor Paolo, American actor
- 1990 – Adam Jezierski, Polish-Spanish actor and singer
- 1990 – Caroline Wozniacki, Danish tennis player
- 1992 – Mohamed Elneny, Egyptian footballer
- 1993 – Rebecca Bross, American gymnast
- 1993 – Heini Salonen, Finnish tennis player
- 1993 – Ryan Strome, Canadian ice hockey player
- 1993 – Vincent Trocheck, American ice hockey player
- 1994 – Bartłomiej Kalinkowski, Polish footballer
- 1994 – Anthony Milford, Australian rugby league player
- 1994 – Nina Nesbitt, Scottish singer-songwriter and guitarist
- 1994 – Lucas Ocampos, Argentine footballer
- 1995 – Joey Bosa, American football player
- 1995 – Tyler Medeiros, Canadian singer-songwriter and dancer
- 1996 – Alessia Cara, Canadian singer-songwriter
- 1997 – Ryan Rolison, American baseball player
- 1999 – Braydon Trindall, Australian rugby league player
- 2002 – Amad Diallo, Ivorian footballer

== Deaths ==
=== Pre-1600 ===
- 472 – Anthemius, Roman emperor (born 420)
- 937 – Rudolph II of Burgundy (born 880)
- 969 – Olga of Kiev (born 890)
- 1174 – Amalric, King of Jerusalem (born 1136)
- 1183 – Otto I, Duke of Bavaria (born 1117)
- 1302 – Robert II of Artois (born 1250)
- 1302 – Pierre Flotte, French politician and lawyer
- 1344 – Ulrich III, Count of Württemberg (born c. 1286)
- 1362 – Anna von Schweidnitz, empress of Charles IV (born 1339)
- 1382 – Nicole Oresme, French philosopher (born 1325)
- 1451 – Barbara of Cilli, Slovenian noblewoman
- 1484 – Mino da Fiesole, Italian sculptor (born c. 1429)
- 1535 – Joachim I Nestor, Elector of Brandenburg (born 1484)
- 1581 – Peder Skram, Danish admiral and politician (born 1503)
- 1593 – Giuseppe Arcimboldo, Italian painter (born 1527)
- 1599 – Chōsokabe Motochika, Japanese daimyō (born 1539)

=== 1601–1900 ===
- 1688 – Narai, Thai king (born 1629)
- 1774 – Sir William Johnson, 1st Baronet, Irish-English general (born 1715)
- 1775 – Simon Boerum, American farmer and politician (born 1724)
- 1797 – Ienăchiță Văcărescu, Romanian historian and philologist (born 1740)
- 1806 – James Smith, Irish-American lawyer and politician (born 1719)
- 1825 – Thomas P. Grosvenor, American soldier and politician (born 1744)
- 1844 – Yevgeny Baratynsky, Russian philosopher and poet (born 1800)
- 1897 – Patrick Jennings, Irish-Australian politician, 11th Premier of New South Wales (born 1831)

=== 1901–present ===
- 1905 – Muhammad Abduh, Egyptian jurist and scholar (born 1849)
- 1908 – Friedrich Traun, German sprinter and tennis player (born 1876)
- 1909 – Simon Newcomb, Canadian-American astronomer and mathematician (born 1835)
- 1929 – Billy Mosforth, English footballer and engraver (born 1857)
- 1937 – George Gershwin, American pianist, songwriter, and composer (born 1898)
- 1959 – Charlie Parker, English cricketer, coach, and umpire (born 1882)
- 1966 – Delmore Schwartz, American poet and short story writer (born 1913)
- 1967 – Guy Favreau, Canadian lawyer, judge, and politician, 28th Canadian Minister of Justice (born 1917)
- 1971 – John W. Campbell, American journalist and author (born 1910)
- 1971 – Pedro Rodríguez, Mexican racing driver (born 1940)
- 1974 – Pär Lagerkvist, Swedish novelist, playwright, and poet Nobel Prize laureate (born 1891)
- 1976 – León de Greiff, Colombian poet and educator (born 1895)
- 1979 – Claude Wagner, Canadian lawyer, judge, and politician (born 1925)
- 1983 – Ross Macdonald, American-Canadian author (born 1915)
- 1987 – Avi Ran, Israeli footballer (born 1963)
- 1987 – Yaakov Yitzchok Ruderman, American rabbi and scholar (born 1901)
- 1989 – Laurence Olivier, English actor, director, and producer (born 1907)
- 1991 – Mokhtar Dahari, Malaysian footballer and coach (born 1953)
- 1994 – Gary Kildall, American computer scientist, founded Digital Research (born 1942)
- 1998 – Panagiotis Kondylis, Greek philosopher and author (born 1943)
- 1999 – Helen Forrest, American singer (born 1917)
- 1999 – Jan Sloot, Dutch computer scientist and electronics technician (born 1945)
- 2000 – Pedro Mir, Dominican lawyer, author, and poet (born 1913)
- 2000 – Robert Runcie, English archbishop (born 1921)
- 2001 – Herman Brood, Dutch musician and painter (born 1946)
- 2003 – Zahra Kazemi, Iranian-Canadian freelance photographer (born 1948)
- 2004 – Laurance Rockefeller, American financier and philanthropist (born 1910)
- 2004 – Renée Saint-Cyr, French actress and producer (born 1904)
- 2005 – Gretchen Franklin, English actress and dancer (born 1911)
- 2005 – Shinya Hashimoto, Japanese professional wrestler (born 1965)
- 2005 – Jesús Iglesias, Argentinian racing driver (born 1922)
- 2005 – Frances Langford, American actress and singer (born 1913)
- 2006 – Barnard Hughes, American actor (born 1915)
- 2006 – Bronwyn Oliver, Australian sculptor (born 1959)
- 2006 – John Spencer, English snooker player and sportscaster (born 1935)
- 2007 – Glenda Adams, Australian author and academic (born 1939)
- 2007 – Lady Bird Johnson, American beautification activist; 43rd First Lady of the United States (born 1912)
- 2007 – Alfonso López Michelsen, Colombian lawyer and politician, 32nd President of Colombia (born 1913)
- 2007 – Ed Mirvish, American-Canadian businessman and philanthropist, founded Honest Ed's (born 1914)
- 2008 – Michael E. DeBakey, American surgeon and educator (born 1908)
- 2009 – Reg Fleming, Canadian-American ice hockey player (born 1936)
- 2009 – Arturo Gatti, Italian-Canadian boxer (born 1972)
- 2009 – Ji Xianlin, Chinese linguist and paleographer (born 1911)
- 2013 – Emik Avakian, Iranian-American inventor (born 1923)
- 2013 – Egbert Brieskorn, German mathematician and academic (born 1936)
- 2013 – Eugene P. Wilkinson, American admiral (born 1918)
- 2014 – Charlie Haden, American bassist and composer (born 1937)
- 2014 – Carin Mannheimer, Swedish author and screenwriter (born 1934)
- 2014 – Bill McGill, American basketball player (born 1939)
- 2014 – Tommy Ramone, Hungarian-American drummer and producer (born 1949)
- 2014 – John Seigenthaler, American journalist and academic (born 1927)
- 2014 – Randall Stout, American architect, designed the Taubman Museum of Art (born 1958)
- 2015 – Giacomo Biffi, Italian cardinal (born 1928)
- 2015 – Satoru Iwata, Japanese game programmer and businessman (born 1959)
- 2015 – André Leysen, Belgian businessman (born 1927)
- 2017 – Jim Wong-Chu, Canadian poet (born 1949)
- 2020 – Marc Angelucci, American attorney and men's rights activist, Vice-president of the National Coalition for Men (born 1968)
- 2020 – Frank Bolling, American baseball second baseman (born 1931)
- 2021 – Charlie Robinson, American actor (born 1945)
- 2021 – Renée Simonot, French actress (born 1911)
- 2023 – Milan Kundera, Czech-French writer (born 1929)
- 2024 – Shelley Duvall, American actress (born 1949)
- 2024 – Monte Kiffin, American football coach (born 1940)
- 2024 – Stanley Tshabalala, South African soccer player and coach (born 1949)
- 2025 – Martin Cruz Smith, American author and screenwriter (born 1942)
- 2026 – Jayden Adams, South African soccer player (born 2001)
- 2026 – Antonio Rattín, Argentine footballer and politician (born 1937)
- 2026 – Ken Bates, English businessman and former owner of Chelsea F.C. and Leeds United F.C. (born 1931)
- 2026 – Lindsey Graham, American politician (born 1955)

== Holidays and observances ==
- Christian Feast Day:
  - Benedict of Nursia
  - Drostan
  - Kjeld
  - Marciana of Toledo
  - Olga of Kiev
  - Pope Pius I
  - Thomas Sprott
  - July 11 (Eastern Orthodox liturgics)
- China National Maritime Day (China)
- Day of the Bandoneón (Argentina)
- Day of the Flemish Community (Flemish Community of Belgium)
- Eleventh Night (Northern Ireland)
- National Day of Remembrance of the victims of the Genocide of the Citizens of the Polish Republic committed by Ukrainian Nationalists (Poland, established by the 22 July 2016 resolution of Sejm in reference to the July 11, 1943 Volhynian Bloody Sunday)
- Gospel Day (Kiribati)
- National Day of Commemoration, held on the nearest Sunday to this date (Ireland)
- The first day of Naadam (July 11–15) (Mongolia)
- World Population Day (International)
- International Day of Reflection and Commemoration of the 1995 Genocide in Srebrenica, established by the U.N. in May 2024.
