= 1411 =

1411 in various calendars
- Gregorian calendar: 1411; MCDXI
- Ab urbe condita: 2164
- Armenian calendar: 860; ԹՎ ՊԿ
- Assyrian calendar: 6161
- Balinese saka calendar: 1332–1333
- Bengali calendar: 817–818
- Berber calendar: 2361
- English Regnal year: 12 Hen. 4 – 13 Hen. 4
- Buddhist calendar: 1955
- Burmese calendar: 773
- Byzantine calendar: 6919–6920
- Chinese calendar: 庚寅年 (Metal Tiger); 4108 or 3901 — to — 辛卯年 (Metal Rabbit); 4109 or 3902
- Coptic calendar: 1127–1128
- Discordian calendar: 2577
- Ethiopian calendar: 1403–1404
- Hebrew calendar: 5171–5172
- Hindu calendars
- Vikram Samvat: 1467–1468
- Shaka Samvat: 1332–1333
- Kali Yuga: 4511–4512
- Holocene calendar: 11411
- Igbo calendar: 411–412
- Iranian calendar: 789–790
- Islamic calendar: 813–814
- Japanese calendar: Ōei 18 (応永１８年)
- Javanese calendar: 1325–1326
- Julian calendar: 1411; MCDXI
- Korean calendar: 3744
- Minguo calendar: 501 before ROC 民前501年
- Nanakshahi calendar: −57
- Thai solar calendar: 1953–1954
- Tibetan calendar: ལྕགས་ཕོ་སྟག་ལོ་ (male Iron-Tiger); 1537 or 1156 or 384 — to — ལྕགས་མོ་ཡོས་ལོ་ (female Iron-Hare); 1538 or 1157 or 385

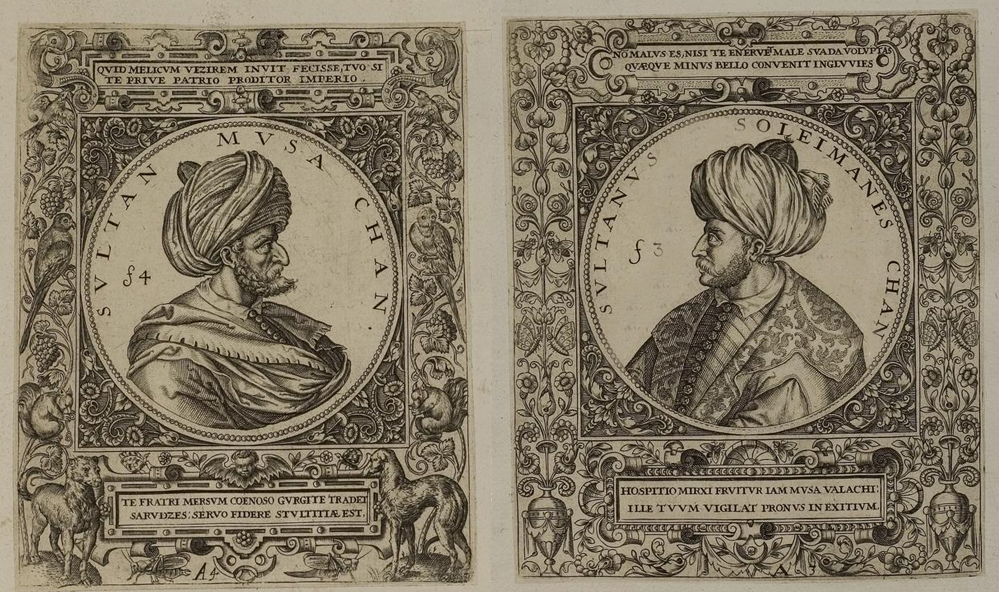
February 17:Musa Çelebi becomes new Ottoman Sultan after forcing his brother Süleyman Çelebi from the throne and killing him.

Year 1411 (MCDXI) was a common year starting on Thursday of the Julian calendar.

== Events ==
=== January–March ===
- January 10 – At Anhilpur Patan in the modern-day state of Gujarat in India, Ahmad Shah I becomes the new Sultan of Gujarat upon the death of his grandfather, Muzaffar Shah I.
- January 18 – Jobst, King of the Romans and Elector of Brandenburg, a member of the House of Luxembourg who had been elected to rule as the German monarch on October 1, dies suddenly at the age of 35 following a suspected poisoning. His death clears the way for Jobst's cousin and rival, Sigismund of Hungary, to become the new King of the Romans, and for control of the Electorate of Brandenburg to pass from the House of Luxembourg to the House of Hohenzollern, with Frederick of Hohenzollern becoming the new Elector in return for supporting the election of Sigismund.
- February 1 – The First Peace of Thorn is signed at Thorn (modern-day Torun in Poland) in the Monastic State of the Teutonic Knights, ending the Polish–Lithuanian–Teutonic War. The Knights cede the region of Dobrzyń Land to the Kingdom of Poland. Thus, the Teutonic Order suffered virtually no territorial losses – a great diplomatic achievement after the crushing defeat in the Battle of Grunwald the previous year.
- February 8 – In Spain, a parliament of representatives from Aragon, Catalonia and Valencia is opened at Calatayud to elect a successor to King Martin of Aragon, who had died eight months earlier on May 31. Although James II is nominated by the castellan of Aragon to be the new King, the parliament declines to support him or any other candidate.
- February 17 – Ottoman Interregnum: Süleyman Çelebi, Sultan of the Ottoman Empire, is strangled to death after being forced by his brother Musa Çelebi, to flee the Ottoman capital, Edirne. Rule of the Ottoman domains in Europe (Rumelia) passes to Musa.
- February 26 (2 Dhu al-Qi'dah 813 A.H.) – At 1:20 in the afternoon, Ahmad Shah I formally lays the foundation of the new city of Ahmedabad at the site of Asawal, where he had defeated the warlord Asha Bhil,) at Manek Burj.
- March 4
  - Friso-Hollandic Wars: Friesland soldiers capture the Netherlands city of Staveren, the last Netherlands stronghold in Friesland, after a bitter winter prevents ships from both sides from crossing the Zuiderzee and freezes the moat around the city walls.
  - Gujarat Sultan Ahmen Shah I declares the new city of Ahmedabad to be the new Gujarat capital.

=== April–June ===
- April 1 – Carlo I Tocco arrives at Ioannina in Greece to become the new ruler of the former Byzantine state, the Despotate of Epirus.
- April 13 – Sandalj Hranić, Duke of Bosnia, sells the Croatian coastal town of Ostrovica to the Republic of Venice, giving the Venetians further control of the Dalmatian Coast and both sides of the Adriatic Sea.
- May 19 – At the order of Louis II of Anjou, General Muzio Attendolo, leader of the Neapolitan Army, defeats the army of King Ladislaus of Naples in a battle at the Battle of Roccasecca in the Lazio region of Italy.
- June 3 – In Vienna, Friedrich IV, nicknamed "Friedrich of the Empty Pockets", becomes the new Duke of Further Austria upon the death of his older brother, Leopold the Fat.
- June 4 – The French city of Roquefort-sur-Soulzon is given exclusive rights by King Charles VI to the ripening and marketing of Roquefort cheese.

=== July–September ===
- July 6 – Ming dynasty Chinese Admiral Zheng He returns to Nanjing after his third voyage, and presents the ruler Vira Alakesvara, captured during the Ming–Kotte War, to China's Emperor Cheng Zu.
- July 21 – Sigismund is formally elected unanimously as King of the Romans by the seven electors of the Holy Roman Empire present.
- July 24 – Battle of Harlaw in Scotland: Domhnall of Islay, Lord of the Isles, and an army commanded by Alexander Stewart, Earl of Mar, battle to a bloody draw.
- August 4 – Parameswara of Malacca (also identified as Bai-li-mi-su-la or Iskandar Shah), Sultan of Malacca in modern-day Malaysia, is hosted by the Ming court in China for the first of three banquets to honor his visit.
- September 3 – The Treaty of Selymbria is concluded between the Ottoman Empire and the Republic of Venice.
- September 21 – King Henry IV of England calls his ninth parliament.

=== October–December ===
- October 3 – At the Abbey of St Vaast in Arras in France, John the Fearless, Duke of Burgundy hosts English Bishop Henry Chichele and several envoys who are ready to negotiate terms for English support of Burgundy in the ongoing French civil war with the Armagnacs. The negotiations fail to attract much support other than to hire some of the English soldiers as mercentaries.
- October 22 – The Duke of Burgundy and his troops capture Paris with the help of English mercenaries.
- November 3 – The English Parliament is assembled after being summoned by King Henry IV, and again elects Thomas Chaucer as Speaker of the House of Commons.
- November 24 – The Swiss canton of Appenzell enters into an alliance with most of the cantons of the Swiss Confederacy.
- November 30 – Henry IV dismisses Prince Henry and his supporters from the government. The next day, the leader of the Armagnacs, the Duke of Orleans, finds that the gates to the walled city of Paris have been locked and are closely guarded.
- December 19 – Royal assent is given by King Henry IV to many of the acts passed by the English Parliament, including the Riot Act 1411, which provides that "The justices of peace and the sheriffs shall arrest those which commit any riot... and inquire of them, and record their offences.
- December 21 – King Henry IV of England issues pardons to all but two of the Welsh rebels in the Glyndŵr rebellion except for the leaders, Owain Glyndŵr and Thomas of Trumpington

=== Date unknown ===
- Under the reign of Emperor Cheng Zu of Ming China, work begins to reinstate the ancient Grand Canal of China, which fell into disuse and dilapidation during the previous Yuan dynasty. Between 1411 and 1415, a total of 165,000 laborers dredge the canal bed in Shandong, build new channels, embankments, and canal locks. Four large reservoirs in Shandong are also dug, in order to regulate water levels, instead of resorting to pumping water from local tables. A large dam is also constructed, to divert water from the Wen River southwest into the Grand Canal.
- Constantinople is briefly besieged by the Ottoman pretender Musa Çelebi, due to Byzantine support for Süleyman Çelebi during the Ottoman Interregnum.
- (possibly early 1412) The Battle of İnceğiz between the rival brothers Mehmed Çelebi and Musa Çelebi, during the Ottoman Interregnum.

== Births ==
- September 21 – Richard of York, 3rd Duke of York, claimant to the English throne (d. 1460)
- date unknown – Juan de Mena, Spanish poet (d. 1456)
- Margareta of Celje, Polish Duchess (d. 1480)

== Deaths ==
- January 18 – Jobst of Moravia, ruler of Moravia, King of the Romans
- February 6 – Esau de' Buondelmonti, ruler of Epirus
- June 3 –Leopold IV, Duke of Austria (b. 1371)
- September – Anne de Mortimer, Countess of Cambridge (b. 1390)
- November 4 – Khalil Sultan, ruler of Transoxiana (b. 1384)
- probable – Hasdai Crescas, Jewish philosopher
