= Battle of Edirne (1410) =

1410 battle of the Ottoman Interregnum

- Part of the Ottoman Interregnum
Date	11 July 1410
Location	outside Edirne
Result	Victory for Süleyman Çelebi

Belligerents
Forces of Süleyman Çelebi	Forces of Musa Çelebi

Commanders and leaders
Süleyman Çelebi	Musa Çelebi

The Battle of Edirne occurred on 11 July 1410, during the Ottoman Interregnum, and was fought between the forces of the rival brothers, Musa Çelebi and Süleyman Çelebi, outside the Ottoman capital, Edirne.

== Background ==
Following his defeat at the Battle of Kosmidion at the gates of Constantinople on 15 June 1410, Musa retreated to the area around Yambol and Chernomen in Bulgaria, while Süleyman recaptured the Ottoman capital of Edirne. One of Musa's lieutenants, Aliaz, was able to capture Plovdiv, where he took prisoner the Serbian lord Vuk Lazarević and his nephew Lazar Branković. Vuk had betrayed Musa by defecting to Süleyman at Kosmidion, and was executed as a result.

== Battle ==
Facing the approach of his brother's forces, Musa was soon forced to move south again, and briefly captured Edirne, which his brother had abandoned. When Süleyman too arrived at the city, the two armies clashed. Musa reportedly tried to have Lazar Branković cause his brother, George Branković, who was fighting with Süleyman, to defect, but without success. The battle ended in a victory for Süleyman, forcing Musa to retreat to his original stronghold around the lower course of the Danube, where he was joined by his ally, Mircea I of Wallachia.

== Aftermath ==
After the battle, Musa retreated to the area around Yambol and Chernomen in Bulgaria, while Süleyman recaptured the Ottoman capital of Edirne. Süleyman sent an army to pursue his brother, but apparently no longer thought him a threat, and instead remained at Edirne, with the chroniclers depicting him engaged in idle pleasure. When Musa, who according to Doukas, had defeated the army Süleyman had sent against him at Sofia, marched on Edirne, Süleyman's forces deserted to Musa. Süleyman himself fled but was captured and executed on 17 February 1411, leaving Musa the sole master of the Ottoman domains in Europe (Rumelia).

== Sources ==
- Kastritsis, Dimitris (2007). The Sons of Bayezid: Empire Building and Representation in the Ottoman Civil War of 1402–13. Brill. ISBN 978-90-04-15836-8.
