= Vuk Lazarević =

Serbian prince (c. 1380 – 1410)

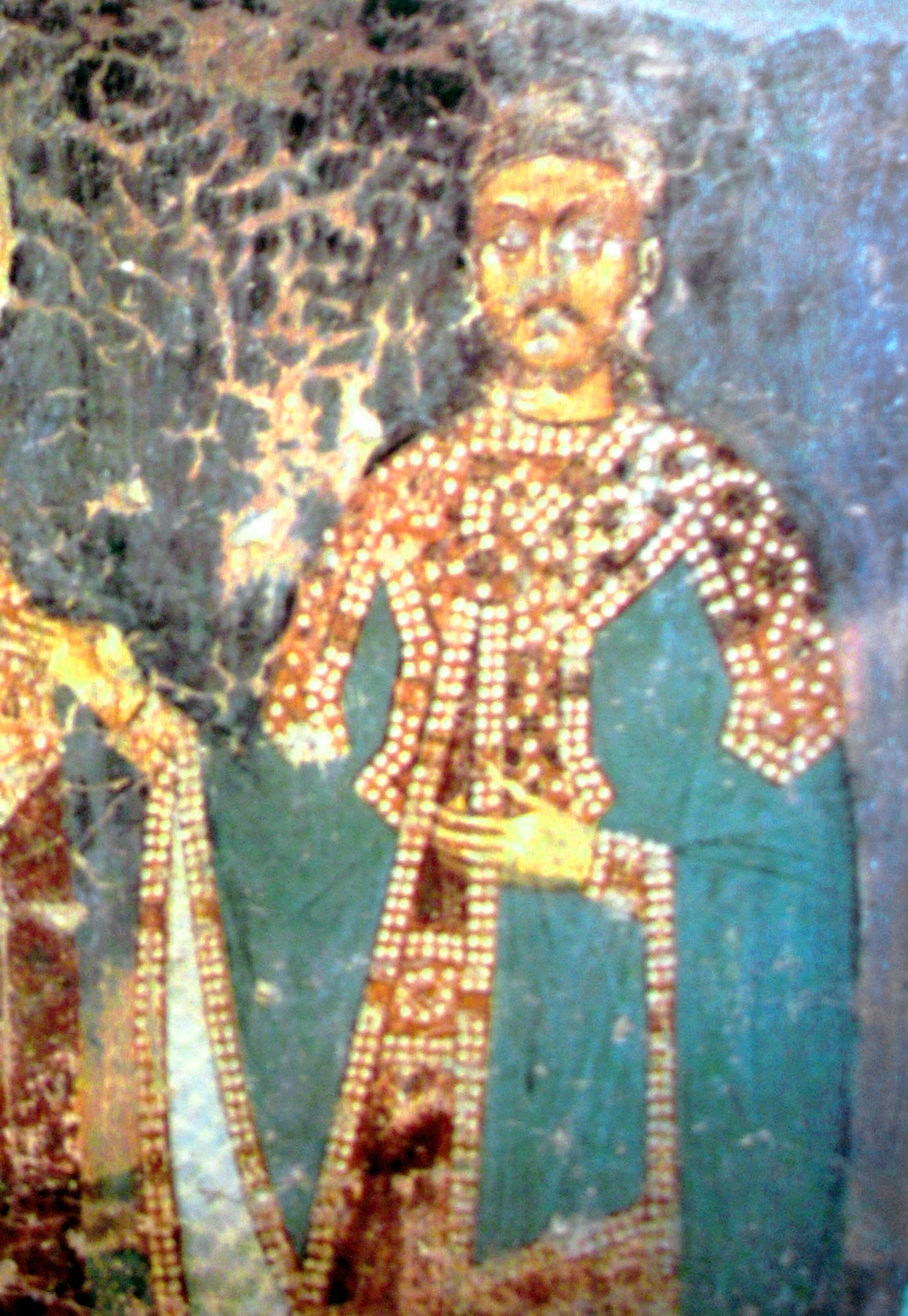
- Fresco of Vuk
- Born: Vuk Lazarević c. 1380
- Died: 6 July 1410
- Cause of death: Execution
- Parent(s): Prince Lazar of Serbia; Milica of Serbia

Vuk Lazarević (Serbian: Вук Лазаревић; c. 1380 – 6 July 1410) was a Serbian prince and the younger son of Prince Lazar of Serbia and Princess Milica Nemanjić. He was executed on 6 July 1410.

He was born sometime around 1380. His older brother Stefan was born in 1377. His other siblings were Mara, Dragana, Teodora, Jelena, and Olivera. After the Battle of Kosovo in 1389, Vuk, Stefan, their mother Milica, and Jefimija began to take part in the control of Serbia. In the Battle of Ankara, Vuk was part of the Ottoman vassal army of his brother, together with the sons of Vuk Branković, Đurađ and Grgur, against the Timurid Empire under Tamerlan.

== Death ==
After defecting from the army of Musa Çelebi to that of his brother Süleyman Çelebi during the Battle of Kosmidion, a part of the Ottoman Interregnum, Vuk was sent to Serbia by Süleyman to seize the lands of his brother Stefan. However, on his way there, he was captured in the city of Philippopolis by a vassal of Musa Çelebi. Vuk was sent to Musa and was summarily executed for his betrayal at Kosmidion.
