= Orhan Çelebi =

Ottoman prince

Orhan Çelebi (1410 – 29 May 1453) was a prince of the Ottoman dynasty. He was the son of Süleyman Çelebi and grandson of Bayezid I.

Orhan lived in Constantinople as an exile and hostage. As the only living male member of the Ottoman dynasty other than Mehmed II, Orhan was a potential challenger to the throne. The Ottoman Empire paid tribute to the Byzantines to keep him as a hostage so that he would not emerge as a rival to Mehmed II. Emperor Constantine XI's threat in 1452 to release Orhan as a challenger unless the tribute money might've provided a pretext for the siege of Constantinople, although preparations for the siege had already started by 1451.

In 1453, Orhan joined the defence of the Byzantine Empire during the Fall of Constantinople with about 600 Ottoman prisoners who were loyal to him by his side. They were charged with defending part of the sea walls, including the harbour of Eptaskalio.

There are several tales about exactly how it happened, but after the city had fallen, Orhan was caught and executed on the orders of Sultan Mehmed II as he tried to escape while disguised as a monk.
