= Battle of Çamurlu =

15th-century battle of the Ottoman Civil War

- Part of the Ottoman Interregnum
Date	5 July 1413
Location	Çamurlu, near modern-day Samokov, Bulgaria
Result	Mehmed's victory; End of the Ottoman Interregnum; reunification of the Ottoman state; Mehmed becomes the sole ruler

Belligerents
Forces of Mehmed Çelebi; Serbian Despotate	Forces of Musa Çelebi

Commanders and leaders
Mehmed Çelebi; Stefan Lazarević	Musa Çelebi (executed)

Strength
10,000	Unknown

The Battle of Çamurlu was fought on 5 July 1413 between Musa Çelebi and Mehmed Çelebi, both sons of Bayezid I, as the last conflict of the Ottoman civil war known as the Ottoman Interregnum. The battle decided which son of Bayezid I would finally reunite the Ottoman Empire, with Mehmed Çelebi becoming Mehmed I of the Ottoman Empire.

== Mehmed's invasion and final battle ==
After suppressing Cüneyt Bey's revolt, Mehmed Çelebi gathered his troops at Ankara. With his Dulkadirid father-in-law, he began planning an invasion of Rumelia (the European part of the empire and Musa's stronghold) to defeat his brother, Musa. On his march to Bursa, Mehmed gained contingents of troops from western Anatolia. Upon reaching the straits, Mehmed's army was given passage by ships loaned from Manuel II Palaiologos, who supplied Mehmed with some troops.

Mehmed marched his army from Constantinople to Edirne. He then marched onto Kosovo to join forces with his ally (and also half-uncle) Serbian ruler Stefan Lazarević, along with receiving information from Evrenos concerning possible defections during the battle.

Both armies met at Çamurlu, near modern-day Samokov, south east of Sofia, Bulgaria. Initially, Musa appeared to be winning the battle despite the defection of Pasha Yigit and Sinan Bey of Trikkala. However, the tide of the battle turned in favor of Mehmed, with the help of Serb and Byzantine troops, and Musa Çelebi fled.

== Aftermath ==
Following the battle, Musa Çelebi was captured and strangled. This battle re-established the unity of the Ottoman state, under the control of Mehmet Çelebi.
