= Battle of Ankara =

1402 Timurid–Ottoman battle

- Part of the Timurid conquests and invasions and the Ottoman wars in Asia
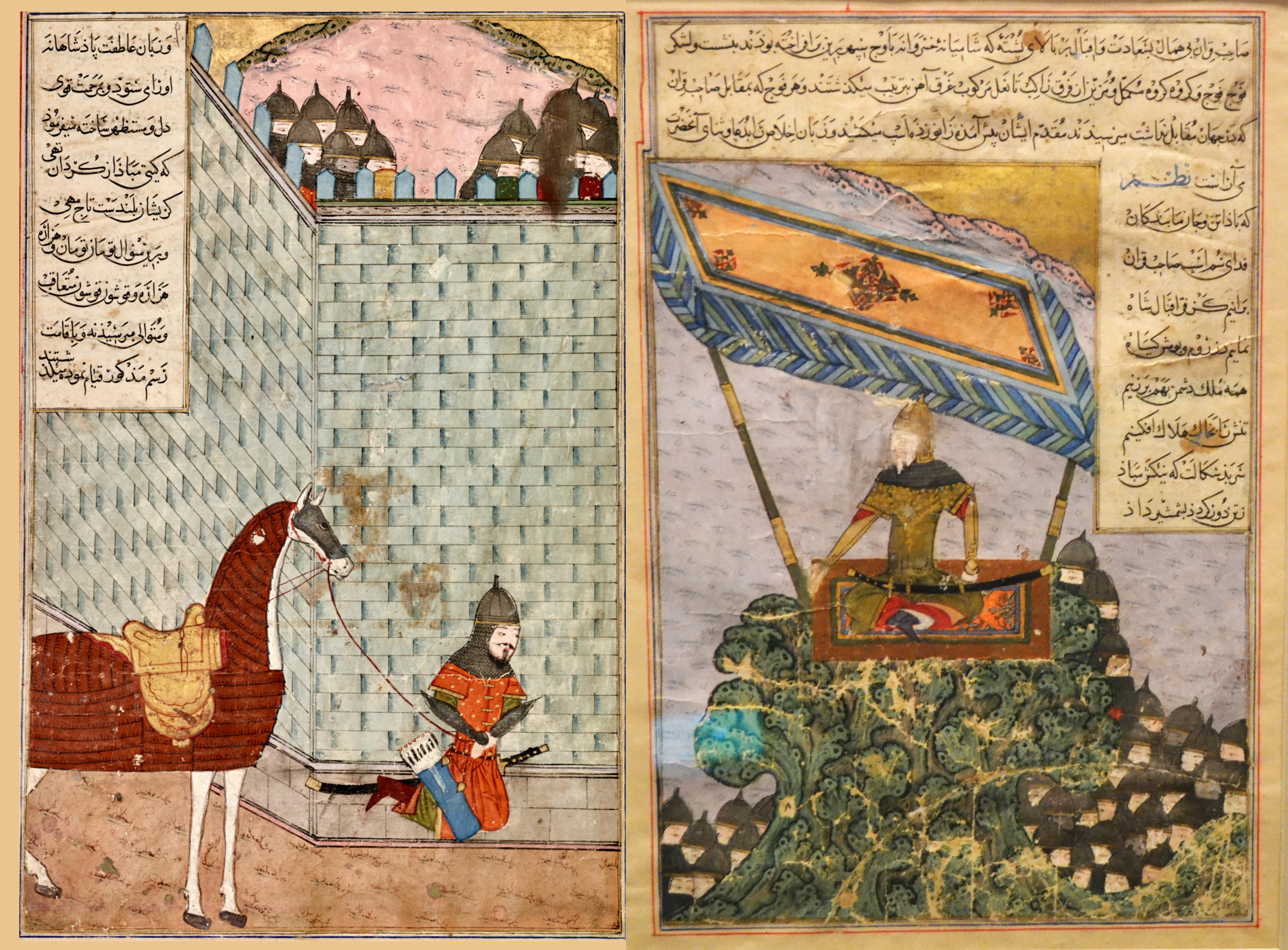
- Timur reviews his troops in the plain of Sivas in the battle of Ankara in mid-summer 1402. Zafarnama of 1436
Date	28 July 1402
Location	Çubuk plain near Ankara 40°09′N 32°57′E
Result	Timurid victory

Belligerents
Timurid Empire	Ottoman Empire; Anatolian beyliks Black Tatars (Note: Anatolian Beyliks and Black Tatars defected to Timurid side during course of the battle.); Moravian Serbia; District of Branković; Principality of Kastrioti; Principality of Jonima

Commanders and leaders
Timur; Miran Shah; Shah Rukh; Muhammad Sultan Mirza (WIA) (Note: Muhammad Sultan Mirza, Timur's grandson and heir-apparent, died on 13 March 1403 of wounds sustained during the campaign.); Pir Muhammad; Khalil Sultan	Bayezid I (POW); Süleyman Çelebi; Mehmed Çelebi; Stefan Lazarević; Vuk Lazarević; Đurađ Branković; Grgur Branković; Gjon I Kastrioti; Koja Zaharia; Dhimitër Jonima; Tanush Dukagjini (probable)

Strength
140,000	85,000–120,000

Casualties and losses
15,000–40,000	40,000–50,000
- Location within Turkey Battle of Ankara (West and Central Asia)

The Battle of Ankara or Angora (Ottoman Turkish: آنقره محاربه‌سی, romanized: Anḳara Muḥârebesi) was fought on 28 July 1402, (Note: Other sources state the battle took place on 20 July 1402.) at the Çubuk plain near Ankara, between the forces of Timur and the Ottoman sultan Bayezid I. The battle was a major victory for Timur, leading to the Ottoman Interregnum.

== Background ==
Timur, a Turco-Mongol from Transoxiana (now Uzbekistan), had built an empire in Central Asia over the years, and became the most powerful ruler in Central Asia since Genghis Khan. He sought to rebuild the once great Mongol Empire. In the 1380s and 1390s, he invaded and conquered parts of Persia (including Azerbaijan and Upper Mesopotamia), ravaged southern Russia and Ukraine (1395–96), and sacked Delhi (1398). Although there had been tensions between the Ottomans and Mongols, nothing would warrant a war, until Bayezid demanded tribute from an emir loyal to Timur, which Timur understood to be a personal affront and a reason for war. In 1400–01 Timur took Sivas from the Ottomans, parts of Syria from the Mamluks, and next directed his forces towards Anatolia.

Meanwhile, in 1402, the Ottomans had been campaigning in Europe. Bayezid broke off the blockade of Constantinople and marched to Ankara after Timur again moved his army to the southeast in the summer of 1402.

== Troops ==
The sizes of the two armies are reliably estimated at 140,000 on Timur's side, mostly cavalry, along with 32 war elephants, and no more than 85,000 under Sultan Bayezid I. Historical sources exaggerated the number of troops to unrealistic proportions according to modern historians: Ahmad ibn Arabshah claimed 800,000 Timurid troops, while a German witness claimed 1.6 million, for instance.

The Ottoman force included contingents under Bayezid's sons, Ghazis, Janissaries, Anatolian Muslim vassals, and various European (Balkan Christian) vassals. Among Serbian vassals participating were Stefan Lazarević, Vuk Lazarević, Đurađ Branković and his brother Grgur Branković, and among Albanian were Koja Zaharia, Dhimitër Jonima, Gjon Kastrioti, and probably Tanush Dukagjini. Christian vassals that did not participate include Zetan Konstantin Balšić. A quarter of the Ottoman troops were recently conquered Tatars.

== Battle positioning ==
Bayezid reluctantly withdrew his forces from the blockade of Constantinople and marched them through the midsummer heat. When they arrived, they were tired and thirsty, but were allowed no time to rest or recuperate. Bayezid was advised by his generals to take up defensive positions and, when Timur's forces pushed back the Ottomans, to withdraw into the mountains and force Timur to break ranks and attempt to hunt the Ottomans in their own terrain during the midsummer heat. Bayezid instead chose to take an offensive stance and marched eastward. Advancing Ottoman scouts found no traces of the Timurids, who secretly marched southwest, rested, and were situated to the rear of the Ottomans. The Timurids encamped in the same locations that the Ottomans had previously occupied, making use of abandoned tents and water sources. The Ottoman army arrived near Ankara 28 July 1402 with Bayezid commanding the centre with Janissaries, his son Suleyman the left flank with the best troops, Stefan Lazarević the right with the Balkan troops, and his son Mehmed Çelebi the rear guard.

In the Timurid army, Timur commanded the centre, his sons Miran and Rukh the right and left, respectively, and his grandsons the vanguard.

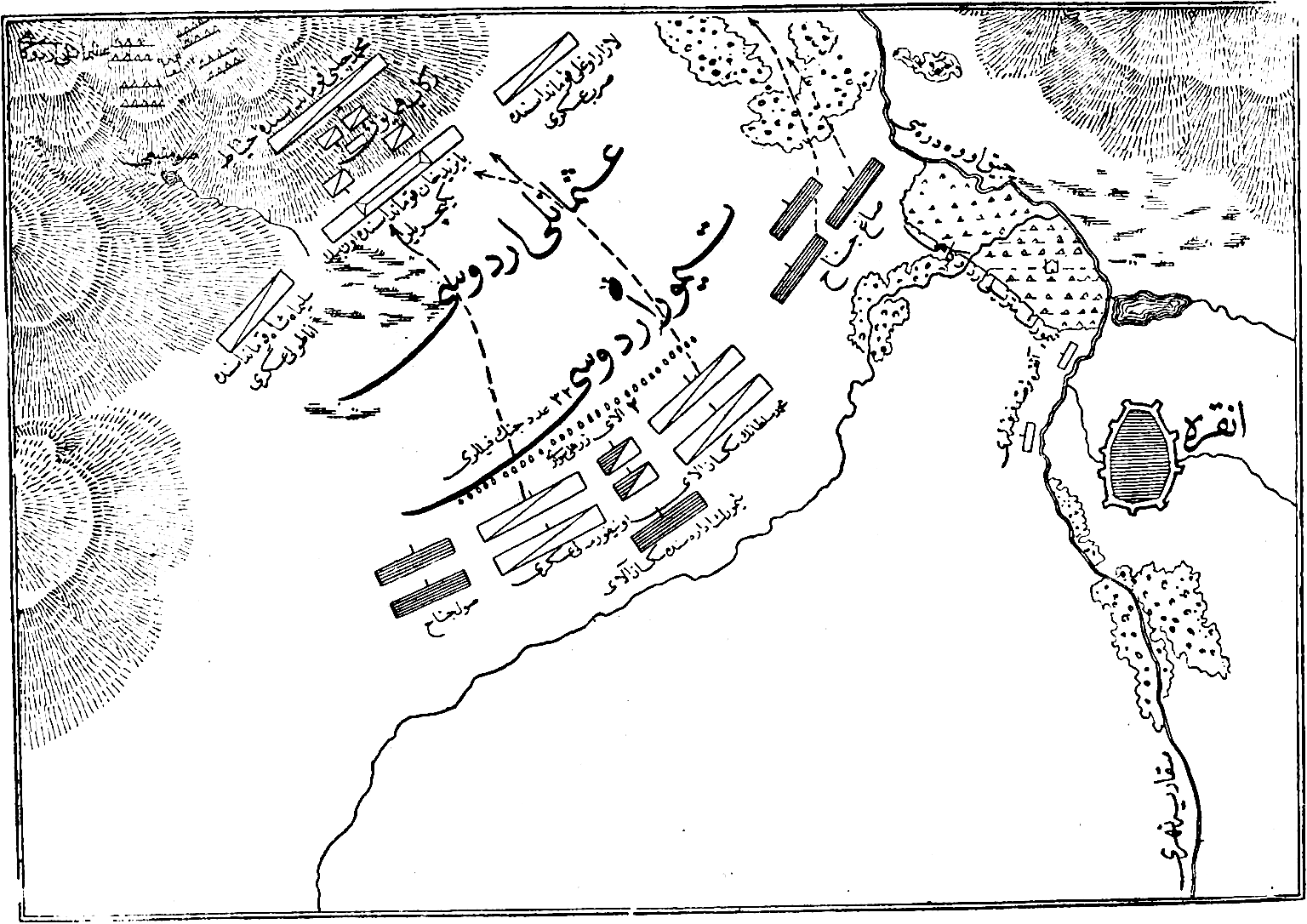
Ottoman Turkish cartographic depiction of the battle by Ahmet Rasim.

== Battle ==
Army positions at the beginning of the battle.

The battle began with a large-scale attack from the Ottomans, countered by swarms of arrows from the Timurid horse archers. Several thousand were killed and many surrendered to Timur. Stefan Lazarević and his knights successfully fought off the Timurid assaults and cut through the Mongol ranks three times. Each time Stefan advised Bayezid to break out with him, Bayezid declined to do so. But the Serbians managed to save one of Bayezid's sons and the treasury from the Mongols and made their way to Constantinople. The Serbian troops wore heavy black plate armour which was very effective against the Timurid arrows. Timur admired the Serbian troops who according to him "fight like lions". During the battle the main water supply of both armies, Çubuk creek, was diverted to an off-stream reservoir near the town of Çubuk by Timur, which left the Ottoman army with no water. The final battle took place at Catal hill, dominating the Çubuk valley. The Ottoman army, both thirsty and tired, was defeated, though Bayezid managed to escape to the nearby mountains with a few hundred horsemen. However, Timur had the mountains surrounded and, heavily outnumbering Bayezid, soon captured him. He died in captivity three months later. Already heavily outnumbered, the Ottoman army was further weakened by the desertion of the Black Tatars and the Sipahis from the Anatolian beyliks, who left Bayezid's side and joined Timur's forces.

== Aftermath ==
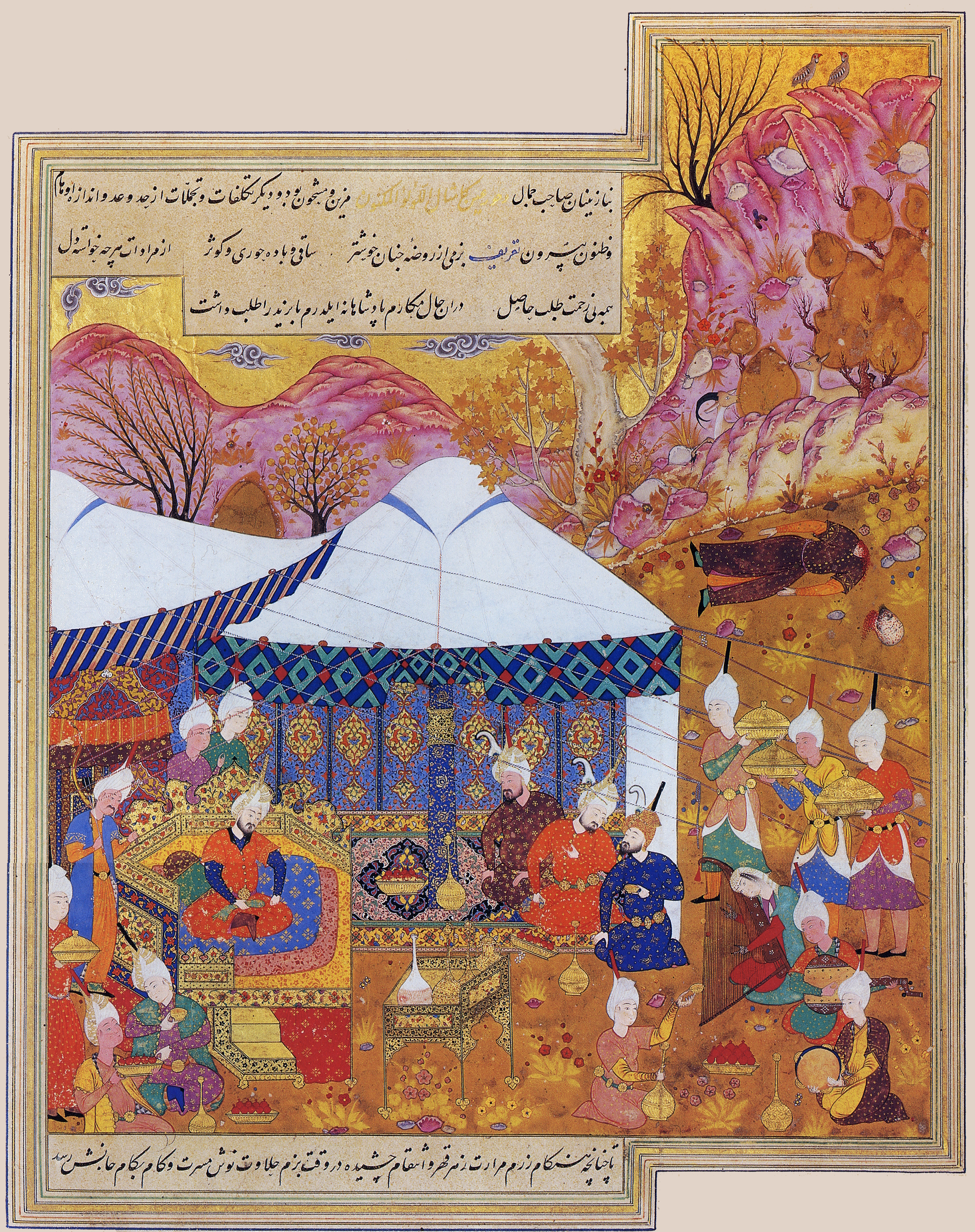
Festivities with Bayezid as prisoner, after conquering Rum territories. Zafarnama, 1528 (Golestan, MS 708).

After the battle, Timur moved through western Anatolia to the Aegean coast, where he besieged and took the city of Smyrna, a stronghold of the Christian Knights Hospitalers. The battle was catastrophic for the Ottoman state, fracturing what remained and bringing almost total collapse of the empire. This resulted in a civil war among Bayezid's sons. The Ottoman civil war continued for another 11 years (1413) following the Battle of Ankara.

The battle is also significant in Ottoman history as being the only time a Sultan was captured in person.
