= Battle of Kosmidion =

1410 battle during the Ottoman Interregnum

- Part of the Ottoman Interregnum
Date	15 June 1410
Location	Kosmidion (modern Eyüp), just outside Constantinople
Result	Victory for Süleyman Çelebi

Belligerents
Forces of Süleyman Çelebi	Forces of Musa Çelebi

Commanders and leaders
Süleyman Çelebi; Vuk Lazarević	Musa Çelebi; Stefan Lazarević

Strength
Unknown	Unknown

Casualties and losses
Heavy	Heavy

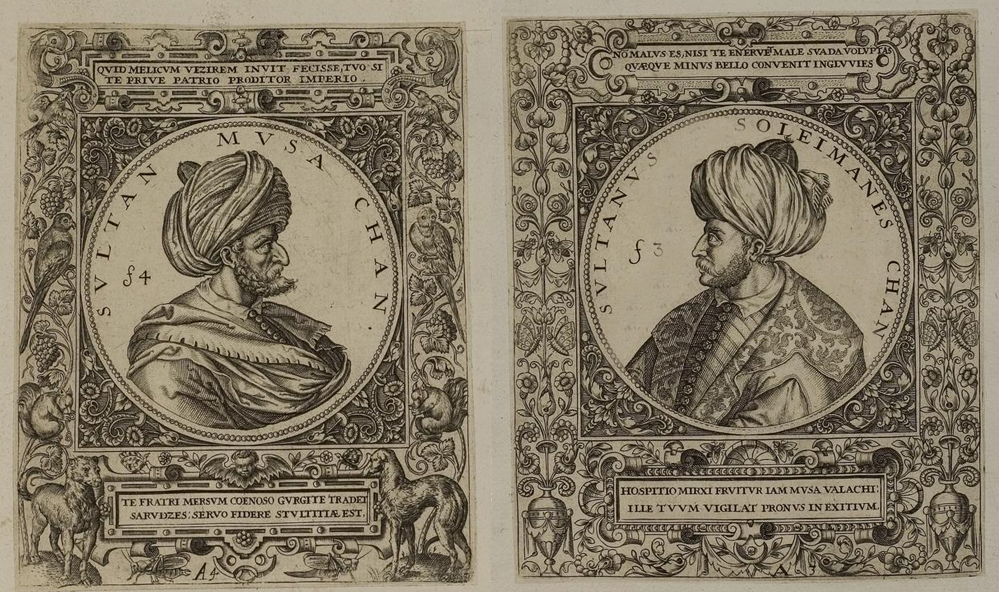
Two Ottoman princes Musa Çelebi (left) and Süleyman Çelebi (right) Edited for illustration of Finnish article Kosmidionin taistelu (en: Battle of Kosmidion). These brothers and princes fought against each other in battle of Kosmidion 15 June 1410.

The Battle of Kosmidion (Turkish: Eyüp Muharebesi) occurred on 15 June 1410, during the Ottoman Interregnum, and was fought between the forces of the rival brothers, Musa Çelebi and Süleyman Çelebi, at Kosmidion (modern Eyüp) just outside the land walls of Constantinople.

== Battle ==
The Byzantine emperor Manuel II Palaiologos was allied with Süleyman, whose army was encamped inside Constantinople. Manuel also prepared ships to help evacuate Süleyman's army in case of a defeat, but Musa managed to set them on fire before the battle began.

The battle was a victory for Süleyman Çelebi, chiefly due to the defection of many of Musa's vassals, who had previously served Süleyman. Among the defectors was Vuk Lazarević, the brothers' half-uncle. Laonikos Chalkokondyles claims that Vuk's brother Stefan also defected due to the pressure of Süleyman's ally, the Byzantine emperor Manuel II Palaiologos, but the chronicler Constantine of Kostenets reports that he fought alongside Musa in the battle, only to seek refuge with Palaiologos after the battle was lost. The battle initially went well for Musa, with Süleyman's army suffering heavy losses, until Süleyman with a few hundred men attacked Musa's camp. Both sides suffered heavy losses in the fighting.

== Aftermath ==
After the battle, Musa retreated to the area around Yambol and Chernomen in Bulgaria, while Süleyman recaptured the Ottoman capital of Edirne. One of his lieutenants, Aliaz, was able to capture Vuk Lazarević at Plovdiv. Musa had Vuk executed for his betrayal.

== Sources ==
- Kastritsis, Dimitris (2007). The Sons of Bayezid: Empire Building and Representation in the Ottoman Civil War of 1402–13. Brill. ISBN 978-90-04-15836-8.
