= Ottoman Interregnum =

Civil war in the early 15th century Ottoman Empire

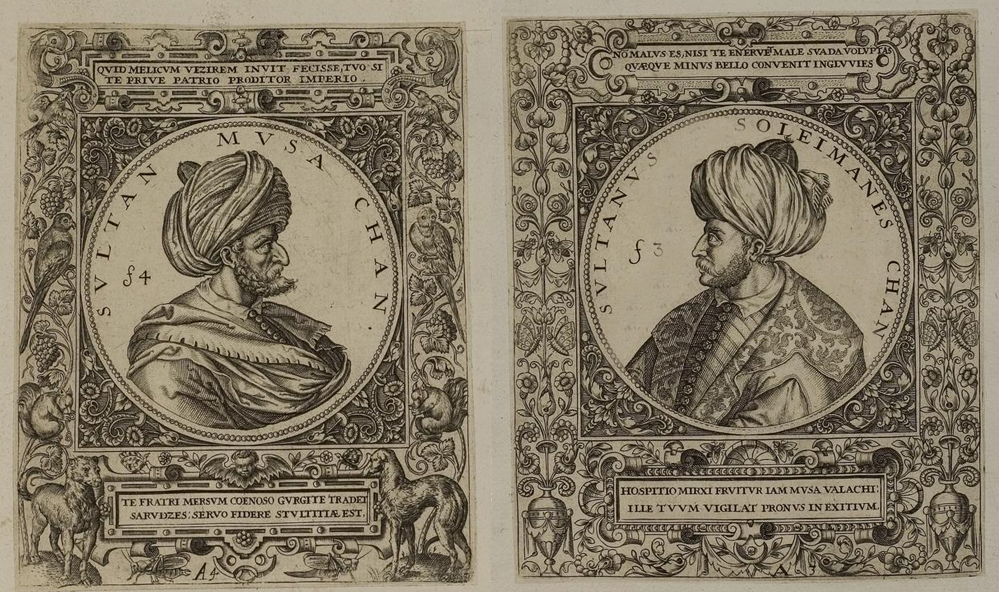
- Late 16th-century depiction of Musa and Süleyman, facing each other
Date	28 July 1402 – 5 July 1413 (10 years, 11 months, 2 weeks and 1 day)
Location	Anatolia, Balkans, Ottoman Empire
Result	Victory for Mehmed; Reunification of the Ottoman state

Belligerents
Mehmed's forces Serbian Despotate; Dulkadirids	İsa's forces	Süleyman's forces	Musa's forces Wallachia

Commanders and leaders
Mehmed Çelebi; Stefan Lazarević; Imamzade Halil Pasha	İsa Çelebi (executed); Junayd of Aydın (Note: Initially)	Süleyman Çelebi † Ali Pasha # Vuk Lazarević (executed) Junayd of Aydın (Note: Later) Orhan Çelebi (Note: After the death of Suleyman Çelebi, Orhan, his very young son attempted to take over the kingdom with the help of certain lords, but his paternal uncle Musa attacked him and, through betrayal rather than battle, ...)	Musa Çelebi (executed); Mircea the Elder; Sheikh Bedreddin

The Ottoman Interregnum, or Ottoman Civil War, (Turkish: Fetret devri, lit. 'Interregnum period') was a civil war in the Ottoman realm between the sons of the Ottoman sultan Bayezid I following their father's defeat and capture by Timur in the Battle of Ankara on 28 July 1402. Although Timur confirmed Mehmed Çelebi as sultan, Mehmed's brothers (İsa Çelebi, Musa Çelebi, Süleyman Çelebi, and later Mustafa Çelebi) refused to recognize his authority, each claiming the throne for himself, which resulted in civil war. The Interregnum would last a little under 11 years and culminate in the Battle of Çamurlu on 5 July 1413, when Mehmed Çelebi emerged as victor, crowned himself Sultan Mehmed I, and restored the empire.

== Civil war ==
=== İsa and Mehmed ===
Civil war broke out among the sons of Sultan Bayezid I upon his death in 1403. His oldest son, Süleyman, with his capital at Edirne, ruled the recently conquered Second Bulgarian Empire, all of Thrace, Macedonia, and northern Greece. The second son, İsa Çelebi, established himself as an independent ruler at Bursa, and Mehmed formed a kingdom at Amasya. War broke out between Mehmed and İsa, and following the Battles of Ermeni-beli and of Ulubad (March–May 1403), İsa fled to Constantinople, and Mehmed occupied Bursa. The subsequent battle at Karasi between Mehmed and İsa resulted in Mehmed's victory and Isa fleeing to Karaman. İsa was later killed in a bath by agents of Mehmed.

=== Süleyman enters civil war ===
Meanwhile, the other surviving son of Bayezid, Musa Çelebi, who was captured at the Battle of Ankara, was released by Timur into the custody of Yakub of Germiyan. Musa was freed after Mehmed made a request for his brother's release. Following İsa's death, Süleyman crossed the straits with a large army. Initially, Süleyman was successful. He invaded Anatolia, capturing Bursa (March 1404) and Ankara later that year.

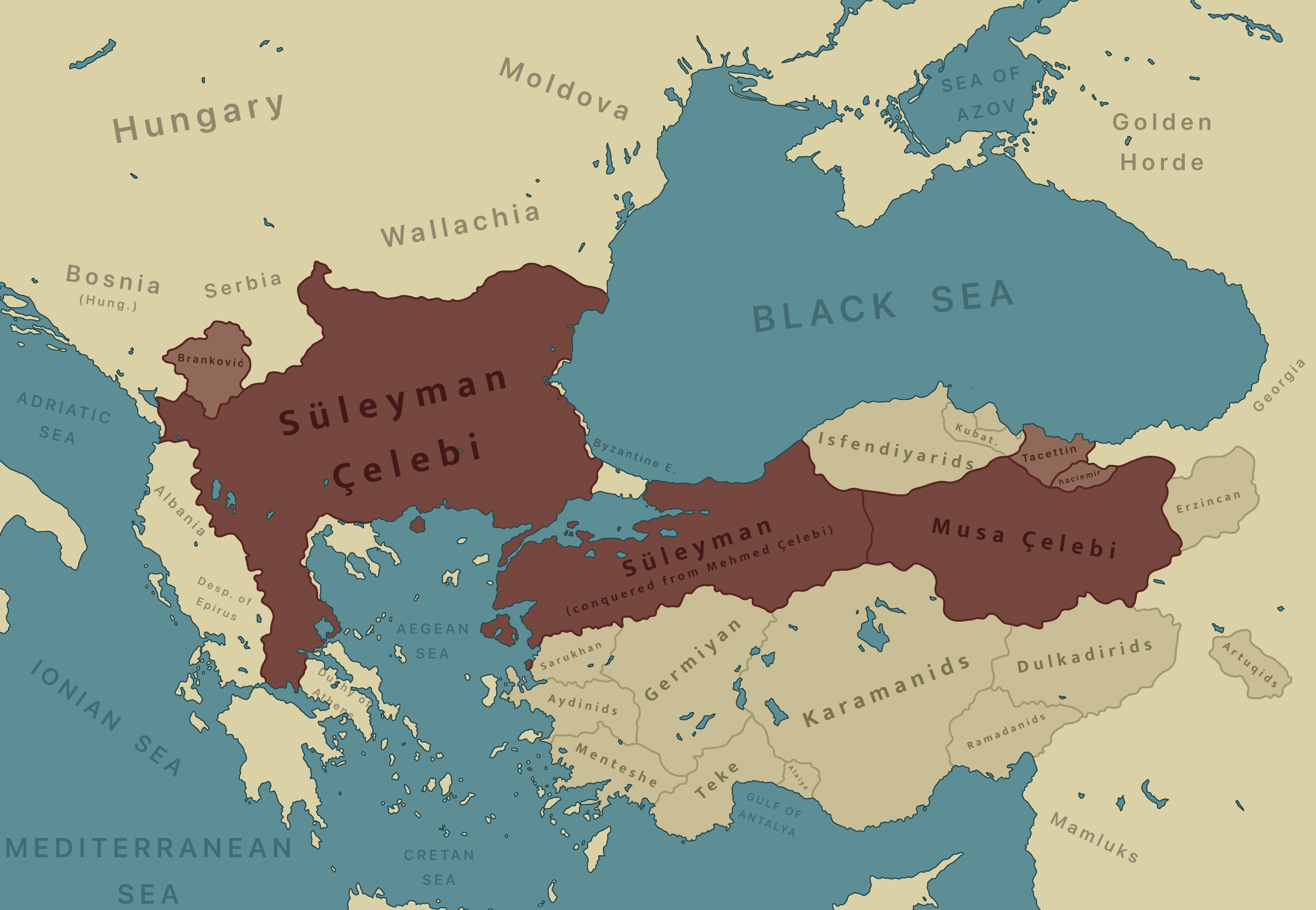
Ottoman Interregnum in 1405

During the stalemate in Anatolia, which lasted from 1405 to 1410, Mehmed sent Musa across the Black Sea to Thrace with a small force to attack Süleyman's territories in south-eastern Europe. The maneuver soon recalled Süleyman to Thrace, where a short but sanguinary contest between him and Musa ensued. At first, Süleyman had the advantage and won the Battle of Kosmidion in 1410, but in 1411 his army defected to Musa at Edirne. Süleyman was captured, given to Musa's bodyguard, Koyun Musasi, and strangled to death on 17 February 1411. Musa was now the ruler of the Ottoman dominions in Thrace.

=== Mehmed and Musa ===
Manuel II Palaiologos, the Byzantine emperor, had allied with Süleyman. Mûsa, therefore, besieged Constantinople. Manuel called on Mehmed to protect him, and Mehmed's Ottomans now garrisoned Constantinople against Musa's Ottomans of Thrace. Mehmed made several unsuccessful sallies against his brother's troops and was obliged to recross the Bosporus to quell a revolt that had broken out in his own territories. Musa now pressed the siege of Constantinople. Mehmed returned to Thrace, and obtained the assistance of Stefan Lazarevic, the Serbian Despot.

The armies of the rival Ottoman brothers met on the Plain of Chamurli (now Samokov, Bulgaria). Hassan, the Agha of the Janissaries of Mehmed, stepped out before the ranks and tried to get the troops to change sides. Musa rushed towards Hassan and killed him, but was himself wounded by an officer who had accompanied Hassan. Musa's Ottomans fought well, but the battle was won by Mehmed and his allies. Musa fled but was later captured and strangled. With Musa dead, Mehmed was the sole surviving son of the late Sultan Bayezid I and became Sultan Mehmed I.

The Interregnum was a striking example of the fratricide that would become common in Ottoman successions.

== Political titles ==
During the Interregnum, only Mehmed minted coins titling himself Sultan. His brother Süleyman had coins that call him Emir Suleyman b. Bayezid, and Musa's coins state, Musa b. Bayezid. No coins of İsa have survived.

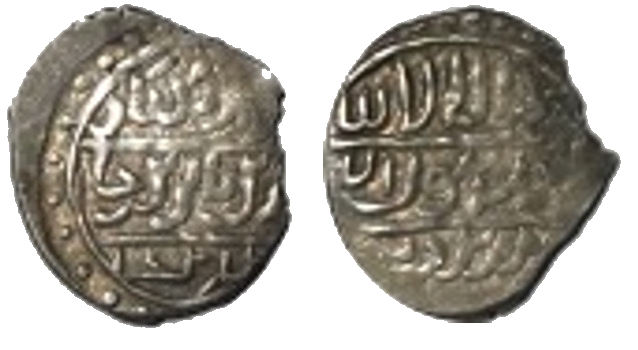
Coin of Mehmed, citing Timur as overlord

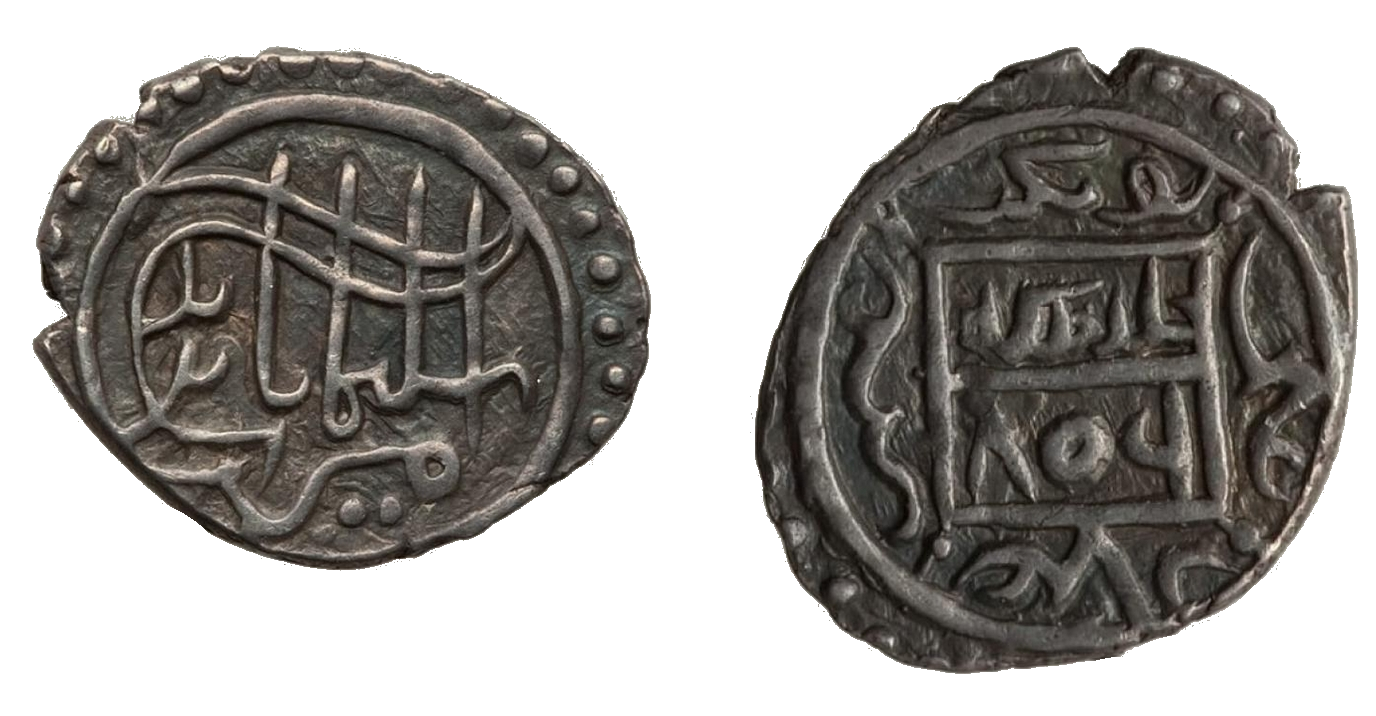
Coin of Süleyman

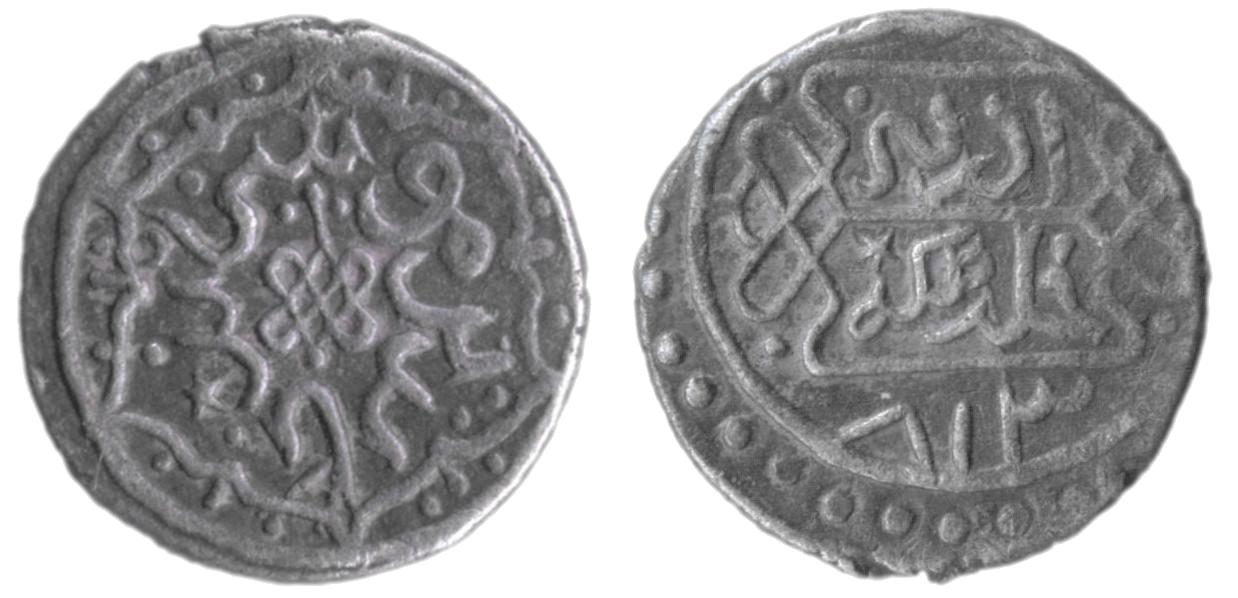
Coin of Musa

== Bibliography ==
- Fine, John V. A. (1994) [1987]. The Late Medieval Balkans: A Critical Survey from the Late Twelfth Century to the Ottoman Conquest. Ann Arbor, Michigan: University of Michigan Press. ISBN 978-0-472-10079-8.
- Finkel, Caroline (2006). Osman's Dream: The Story of the Ottoman Empire 1300–1923. London: John Murray. ISBN 978-0-7195-6112-2.
- Imber, Colin (2002). The Ottoman Empire, 1300–1650: The Structure of Power (First ed.). Basingstoke: Palgrave Macmillan. ISBN 978-0-3336-1386-3.
- Kastritsis, Dimitris (2007). The Sons of Bayezid: Empire Building and Representation in the Ottoman Civil War of 1402–13. Brill. ISBN 978-90-04-15836-8.
- Magoulias, Harry, ed. (1975). Decline and Fall of Byzantium to the Ottoman Turks, by Doukas. An Annotated Translation of "Historia Turco-Byzantina" by Harry J. Magoulias, Wayne State University. Detroit: Wayne State University Press. ISBN 978-0-8143-1540-8.
- Mélikoff, I. (1965). "D̲j̲unayd". In Lewis, B.; Pellat, Ch. & Schacht, J. (eds.). The Encyclopaedia of Islam, Second Edition. Volume II: C–G. Leiden: E. J. Brill. pp. 599–600. doi:10.1163/1573-3912_islam_SIM_2116. OCLC 495469475.
- Nicol, Donald MacGillivray (1972). The last centuries of Byzantium, 1261–1453. Cambridge University Press.
- Ostrogorsky, George (1969). History of the Byzantine State. Rutgers University Press.
- Philippides, Mario (2007). Mehmed II the Conqueror and the Fall of the Franco-Byzantine Levant to the Ottoman Turks: Some Western Views and Testimonies. ACMRS/Arizona Center for Medieval and Renaissance Studies.
- Pitcher, Donald Edgar (1968). An Historical Geography of the Ottoman Empire. E.J. Brill.
- Spuler, Bertold; Bagley, Frank Ronald Charles; Kissling, Hans Joachim (1996). The Last Great Muslim Empires: History of the Muslim World. Markus Weiner Publishers.
- Zachariadou, Elisabeth A. (1983). Trade and Crusade: Venetian Crete and the Emirates of Menteshe and Aydin (1300–1415). Venice: Istituto Ellenico di Studi Bizantini e Post-bizantini di Venezia. OCLC 144691037.
