= Musa Çelebi =

Ottoman prince (d. 1413), claimant to the throne

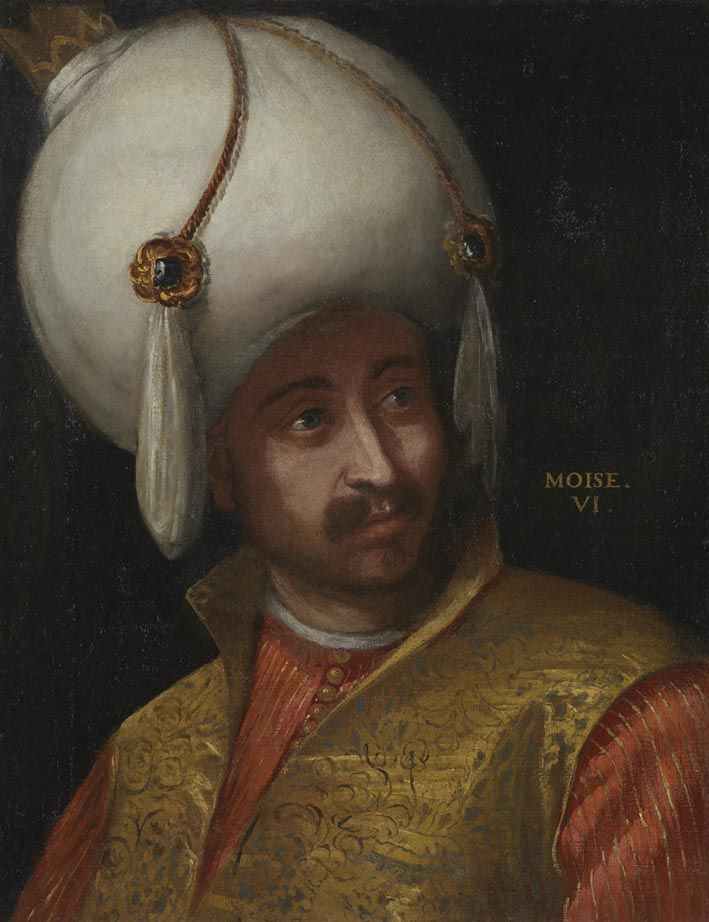
- A portrait of Musa Çelebi. Painted by an artist associated with Veronese's circle, Italy, c. 1580

Sultan of the Ottoman Sultanate (de facto)
- Reign: 17 February 1411 − 5 July 1413
- Predecessor: Süleyman Çelebi (de facto)
- Successor: Mehmed I
- Died: 5 July 1413; Çamurlu (near Samokov)
- Burial: Bayezid I Mosque, Bursa, Turkey
- Spouse: Arina of Wallachia; Unnamed daughter of Carlo I Tocco
Names
- Musa Çelebi bin Bayezid
- Father: Bayezid I
- Mother: Devletşah Hatun
- Religion: Sunni Islam

Musa Çelebi (fl. 1402 – 5 July 1413) was an Ottoman prince and a co-ruler of the empire for three years during the Ottoman Interregnum.

== Background ==
Musa was one of the sons of Bayezid I, the fourth Ottoman sultan. His mother was Devletşah Hatun. After the Battle of Ankara, in which Bayezid I was defeated by Tamerlane, he returned to the Ottoman Empire, which was now in turmoil, and tried to access the throne in Bursa, the Anatolian capital of the empire in 1403. However, three of his brothers were also claimants to the Ottoman throne: İsa Çelebi in Balıkesir and Mehmed Çelebi in Amasya (both in the Anatolian portion of the empire), Süleyman Çelebi in Edirne, the Rumeli (European) capital. (the Ottoman Empire at the time had two capitals, since the declining Byzantine Empire in Constantinople separated the two parts of the Ottoman lands).

== Ottoman Interregnum ==
İsa defeated Musa and captured Bursa. Musa took refuge in Germiyanid territory, where he waited for a suitable moment to try again. In 1406, Mehmed, who had defeated İsa, became the sole ruler of the Anatolian portion of the empire, but he was no match for Süleyman of the Rumeli (European) portion. Mehmed and Musa met in Kırşehir in central Anatolia and formed an alliance against Süleyman. Most of the beyliks in Anatolia also supported this alliance. According to the terms of the alliance, Musa was sent to the European part over the Black Sea where he allied himself with Mircea of Wallachia. Süleyman now had to fight on two fronts, against Mehmed in Anatolia and against Musa in Europe. This strategy was partially successful, as Süleyman gave up his hopes to conquer the Anatolian portion of the empire. However, he was able to defeat Musa at the battles of Kosmidion and Edirne. Despite his defeat, Musa continued his hit-and-run tactics against Süleyman up until 1410. Meanwhile, Süleyman had lost most of his previous allies due to his uncontrollable temper. In 1411, Musa's tactics finally prevailed and he captured Edirne. The defeated Süleyman, while attempting to escape into Byzantine territories, was killed by villagers on 18 February 1411, and Musa found himself as the co-sultan of the empire.

== As a co-sultan ==
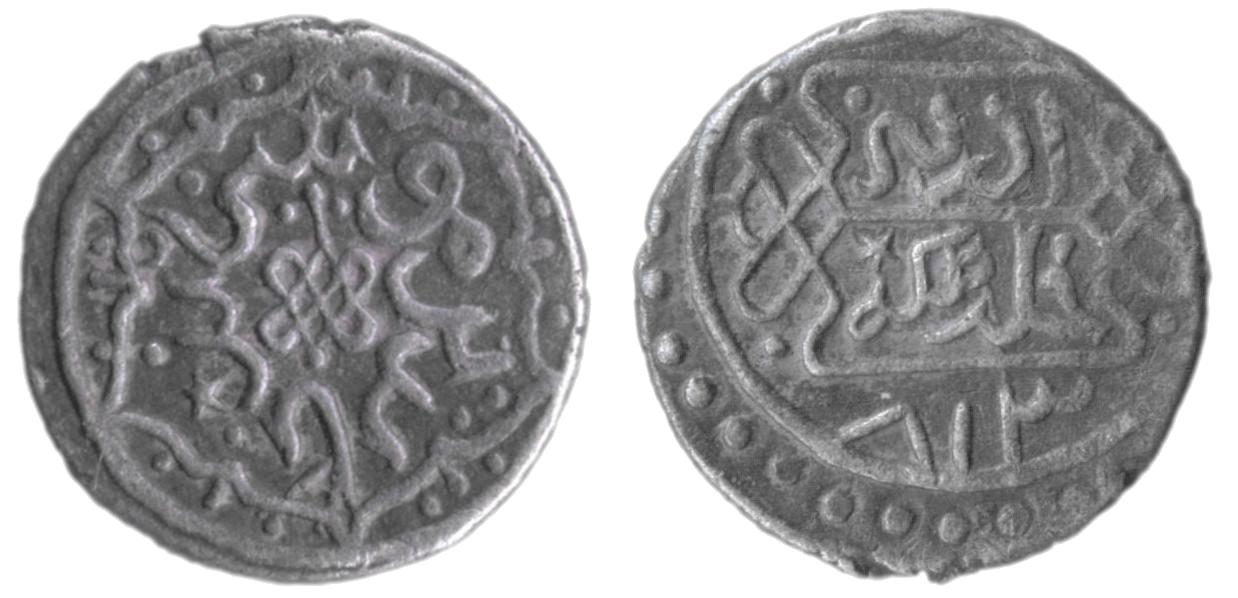
1411 AD dated akçe minted by Musa. Obverse having the full name (reading as follows: Musa Çelebi son of Bayezid), and on the reverse location of the mint and the issue year (reading as follows: Struck in Edirne. May his kingdom perpetuate. 813 [AH])

The details of the previous Mehmed–Musa alliance are not clear. Musa declared himself the sultan of the European portion of the empire, while Mehmed viewed Musa as his vassal. Musa besieged Byzantine Constantinople (modern Istanbul) as retribution for Manuel II Palaiologos's support for Süleyman during the previous battles between Musa and Süleyman. Manuel II Palaiologos turned to Mehmed for support, who betrayed Musa and set up a new alliance between himself and the Byzantines against Musa.

In 1411 and in 1412, Mehmed's forces clashed with Musa's, and in both cases Mehmed was defeated. In 1413, Mehmed gained the support of Serbian monarch Stefan Lazarević and the bey of the Turkish Dulkadirids, as well as some of the generals in Musa's army. He defeated Musa's forces in the Battle of Çamurlu near Samaku (today Samokov, Bulgaria). Injured and trying to escape, Musa was spotted and killed on 5 July 1413.

== Aftermath ==
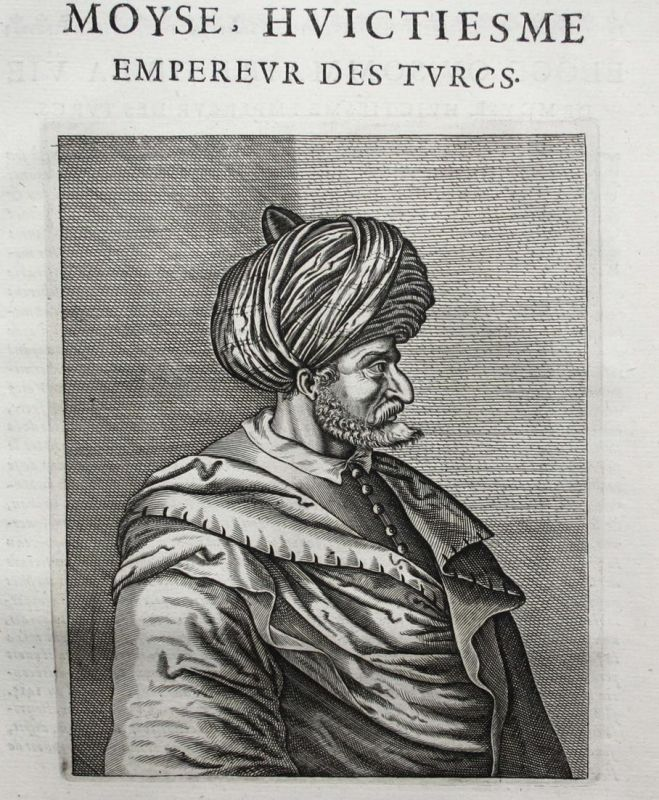
Musa, Emperor of the Turks by Thomas Artus in Histoire des Turcs, 17th century.

Musa's death ended the Ottoman Interregnum. His brother Mehmed Çelebi became Sultan Mehmed I. However, in 1416, Sheikh Bedreddin, one of Musa's former allies (chief military judge, the kazasker), led an unsuccessful revolt against Mehmed I. Other events that may be viewed as the continuation of the interregnum were the two rebellions of Mustafa Çelebi, another one of Bayazid's sons who had been hiding in Anatolia. Mustafa was a fifth claimant to throne and he fought against both his brother Mehmed I in 1416 and his nephew Murad II in 1421 unsuccessfully.

== Family ==
Musa married two times:

1. Arina of Wallachia, daughter of Mircea I of Wallachia, married in 1403;
2. An illegitimate daughter of Carlo I Tocco, married in 1412.

== Sources ==
- Akgunduz, Ahmed; Ozturk, Said (2011). Ottoman History – Misperceptions and Truths. IUR Press.
- Kastritsis, Dimitris (2007). The Sons of Bayezid: Empire Building and Representation in the Ottoman Civil War of 1402–1413. Brill.
