= Süleyman Çelebi =

Ottoman prince, son of Sultan Bayezid I

- Emir
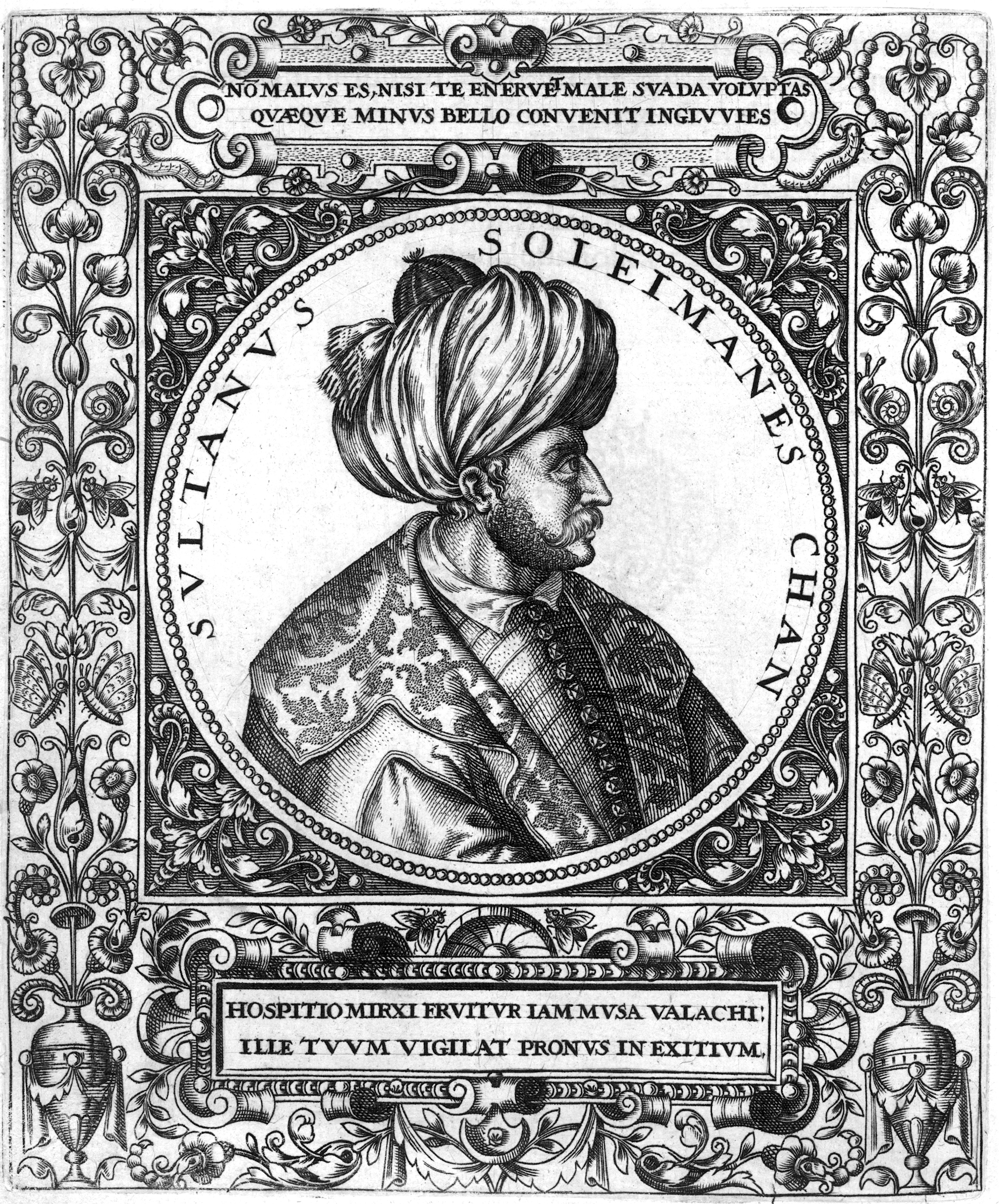
- Portrait of Suleyman Celebi

Sultan of the Ottoman Empire (de facto)
- Reign: c. 1402 − 17 February 1411
- Predecessor: Bayezid I
- Successor: Musa Çelebi (de facto)
- Grand vizier: Çandarlı Ali Pasha (1402–1406)
- Born: c. 1377
- Died: 17 February 1411 (aged 33–34); Düğüncü village, near Constantinople
- Burial: Muradiye Complex, Bursa, Turkey
- Spouse: Theodora
- Issue: Orhan Çelebi
Names
- Emir Süleyman bin Bayezid
- Father: Bayezid I
- Religion: Sunni Islam
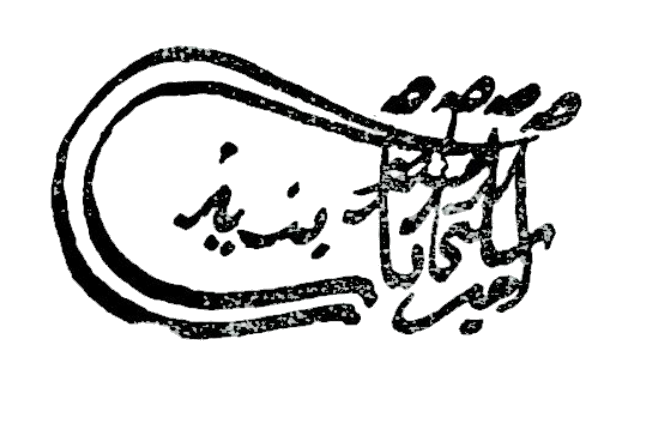
- Tughra

Süleyman Çelebi (also Emir Süleyman; fl.1377 – 17 February 1411) was an Ottoman prince and a co-ruler of the Ottoman Empire for several years during the Ottoman Interregnum. There is a tradition of Western origin, according to which Suleiman the Magnificent was "Suleiman II", but that tradition has been based on an erroneous assumption that Süleyman Çelebi was to be recognised as a legitimate sultan.

== Background ==
Süleyman was the second eldest son of Bayezid I after Ertuğrul Çelebi. In some contemporary Western sources, he was considered among the Ottoman sultans due to his reign during the interregnum and is referred to as Suleiman I. There is not much information about his early life. Historical records first mention him as the administrator of Aydın province, which controlled the ports of Balat and Ayasuluk after Bayezid I's Western Anatolian campaign in the winter of 1389-1390. Nicolae Iorga states that Süleyman was the bey of Northern Rumelia before being appointed to this position. This is probably related to the event in which the Ottoman army under the command of Çandarlı Ali Paşa completed the conquest of northeastern Bulgaria from the winter of 1387-1388 to the spring of 1389. There is no mention in Ottoman sources of Süleyman's conquest of Tarnovo, the center of the Bulgarian Tsardom, in 1393. Although some chronicles state that he was given the administration of Sivas in 1392 and the Kastamonu region the following year, these were due to a confusion of events. It is known that Süleyman, who participated in the Battle of Nicopolis in 1396, was sent to Sivas with an army by his father Bayezid in the summer of 1398 after the capture of Amasya and defeated the Aq Qoyunlu ruler Qara Yuluk Uthman Beg, who was trying to control the region, and became the administrator of the Sivas province. During this war, the Bavarian traveler Schiltberger was also with Süleyman. However, Süleyman did not stay in Sivas for long. He was probably appointed as the administrator of the Aydın, Saruhan and Karesi regions after the death of his elder brother Ertuğrul Çelebi in 1400. He participated in the Battle of Ankara, which took place shortly afterwards, together with the Sarukhanid, Aydinid and Karasid troops under his command.

== Ottoman Interregnum ==
Map of the southern Balkans and western Anatolia in 1410, shortly before Süleyman's defeat. Ottoman and Turkish territories are marked in shades of brown, Byzantine territory in pink, and Venetian and Venetian-influenced areas in green

He signed the Treaty of Gallipoli with the Byzantine regent John VII Palaiologos in 1403. (The emperor Manuel II Palaiologos was traveling in West Europe at the time). By this treaty, he gave up the city of Thessalonica and certain territories along the Marmara coast to the Byzantine Empire in return for Byzantine support in interregnum. He declared himself as the sultan of the empire in Edirne, the co-capital in Rumeli of the Ottoman Empire. But the Asiatic side of the empire, so called Anatolia, was under the control of his two brothers İsa Çelebi and Mehmet Çelebi (future Mehmed I). Süleyman supported İsa against Mehmet. However, Mehmet defeated İsa in several battles in 1406. Afraid of Mehmet's increasing power, Süleyman crossed the Dardanelles strait to reunite the empire. He captured Bursa, the Anatolian capital. But before fighting against Mehmet, he marched to the Aegean Region to intimidate the small Turkmen principalities (beyliks of Aydin and Menteşe) which had been annexed by the brothers' father Beyazid I, but had broken free after the disastrous Battle of Ankara. He then captured the city of Ankara from Mehmet but did not advance further.

Süleyman returned to Bursa, which gave Mehmet a chance to relax. Mehmet then made an alliance with their brother Musa Çelebi, who was also a contender for the Ottoman throne, sending Musa to the European portion of the empire (Rumelia) via Wallachia (modern Romania). Because of this plot, Süleyman now had to fight on two fronts, one in Europe against Musa and one in Anatolia against Mehmet. Süleyman turned his attention to Rumelia against Musa, leaving Anatolia to Mehmet once again. Musa had the support of Wallachians and the Serbs, and Süleyman had the support of the Byzantines. However, the Serbs switched sides and joined Süleyman's forces, and Musa was defeated in the Battle of Kosmidion on 15 June 1410. However, Süleyman was not a willful prince, and to the dismay of his partisans, he began living in extravagance. Especially after the death of his able vizier Çandarlı Ali Pasha, Süleyman's indifference to state affairs caused him to lose supporters. Thus in 1411, when Musa marched to Edirne, Süleyman found almost no one at his side. He tried to escape to Byzantine territories, but on the way, he was murdered on February 17, 1411.

== Aftermath ==
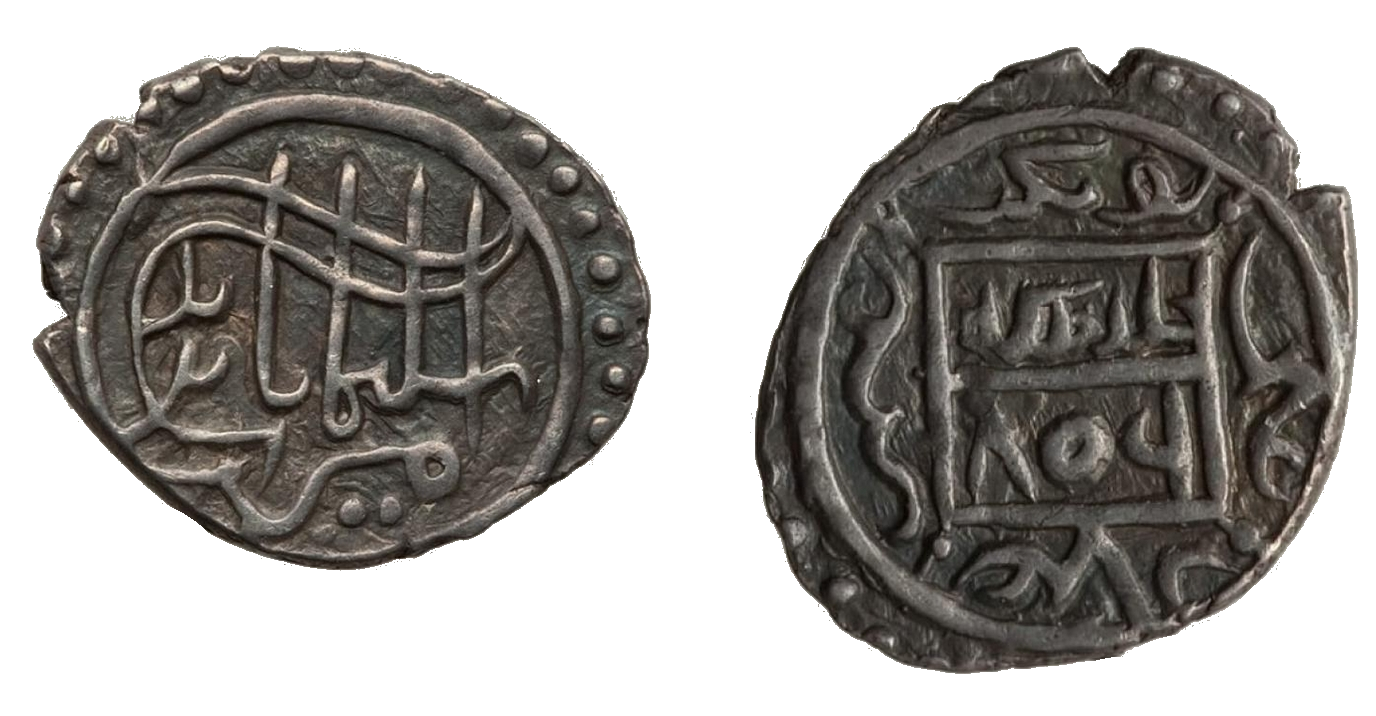
1404 AD dated akçe minted by Süleyman. Obverse having a tughra (reading as follows: Emir Süleyman son of Bayezid), and reverse having names of the Rashidun caliphs (Abu Bakr, Omar, Uthman, Ali), and the year of issue.

After Süleyman's death, Musa became the ruler of the Rumeli. The alliance between Mehmet and Musa soon broke and the two brothers continued to fight until Musa's defeat and death on July 5, 1413, in the Battle of Çamurlu when Mehmet became the sole ruler of the empire as Mehmet I.

== Family ==
Süleyman had only one known consort, Theodora, illegitimate daughter of Theodore I Palaiologos, Despot of Morea and son of John V Palaiologos, and of his unnamed mistress, married in 1404. In exchange, in 1403 Süleyman offered his half-siblings Kasim Çelebi, Yusuf Çelebi and Fatma Hatun as hostages to Manuel II.

He had one son, born by an unknown concubine, Orhan Çelebi (1395–1429). Orhan had three sons and two daughters:

- Orhan Çelebi (1412–1453).
- Mehmed Şah Çelebi (died on 31 December 1421).
  - Paşa Melek Hatun. She married an Ottoman Sanjak-bey.
- Fatma Şahzade Hatun, well known as Hund Şehzade (1422–1455).
- Suleyman Çelebi (1423–1437).

== Sources ==
- Zachariadou, Elizabeth A. "Süleyman çelebi in Rumili and the Ottoman chronicles." Der Islam 60.2 (1983): 268–296.
