= Siege of Thessalonica (1422–1430) =

Ottoman capture of the Byzantine city

- Part of the Byzantine–Ottoman wars and the Ottoman–Venetian wars
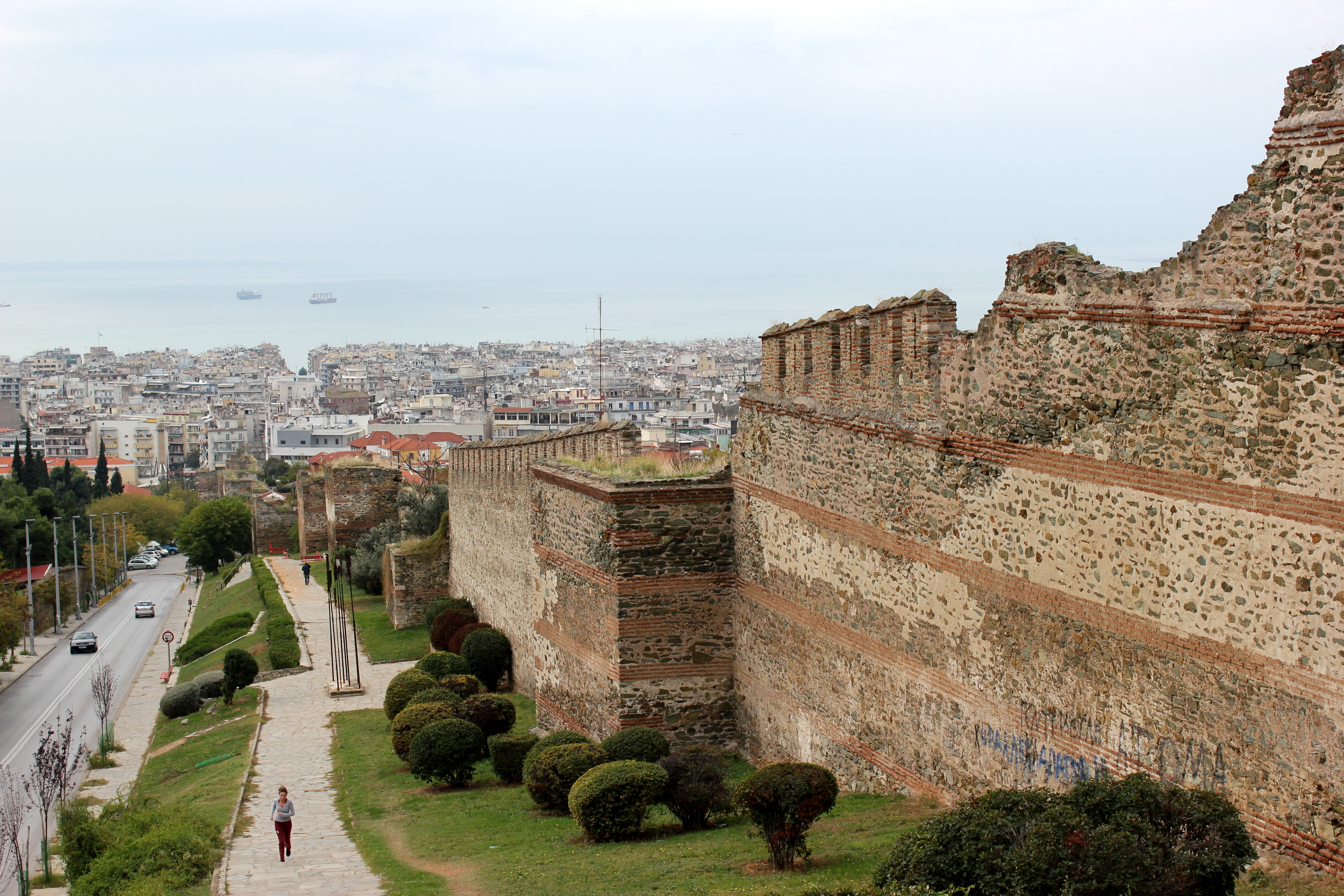
- The eastern city wall of Thessalonica, with the Thermaic Gulf in the background (2012)
Date	June 1422 – 29 March 1430
Location	Thessalonica and environs, with engagements at Gallipoli and various raids in the Aegean Sea 40°38′15″N 22°56′42″E
Result	Ottoman victory
Territorial changes	Ottomans successfully capture Thessalonica

Belligerents
Ottoman Empire	Byzantine Empire (until September 1423); Republic of Venice (from September 1423)

Commanders and leaders
(Ottoman Empire) Murad II (Ottoman Empire) Sinan Pasha (Ottoman Empire) Hamza Bey (Ottoman Empire) Burak Bey	(Byzantine Empire) Andronikos Palaiologos (Byzantine Empire) Symeon # (Republic of Venice) Pietro Loredan (Republic of Venice) Fantino Michiel (Republic of Venice) Andrea Mocenigo (Ottoman Empire) Mustafa Çelebi (doubtful)

Strength
(Ottoman Empire) 22,000	(Byzantine Empire) (Republic of Venice) 25,000

Casualties and losses
(Ottoman Empire) Unknown	(Byzantine Empire) (Republic of Venice) Heavy casualties (Byzantine Empire) (Republic of Venice) 7,000 Prisoners

The siege of Thessalonica between 1422 and 1430 saw the Ottoman Empire, under Sultan Murad II, capture the city of Thessalonica. Afterwards, the city remained in Ottoman hands for the next five centuries until it became part of the Kingdom of Greece in 1912.

Thessalonica had already been under Ottoman control from 1387 to 1403 before returning to Byzantine rule in the aftermath of the Battle of Ankara. In 1422, after the Byzantines supported Mustafa Çelebi, a rival pretender against him, Murad attacked Thessalonica. Unable to provide manpower or resources for the city's defence, its ruler, Andronikos Palaiologos, handed it over to the Republic of Venice in September 1423. The Venetians attempted to persuade the Sultan to recognise their possession, but failed as Murad considered the city his by right and the Venetians to be interlopers. This impasse led to an Ottoman blockade of Thessalonica, which occasionally flared up with direct attacks on the city. At the same time, the conflict was mostly fought as a series of raids by both sides against the other's territories in the Balkans and the Aegean Islands. The Venetians repeatedly tried to apply pressure by blocking the passage of the Dardanelles at Gallipoli, with little success.

The blockade quickly reduced the inhabitants to near starvation, and led many to flee the city. The restrictions placed on them by the siege, the inability of Venice to properly supply and guard the city, the violations of their customary rights, and rampant profiteering by Venetian officials led to the formation of a pro-surrender party within the city, which gained strength among the inhabitants. The city's metropolitan bishop, Symeon, encouraged his flock to resist. However, by 1426, with Venice's inability to secure peace on its own terms evident, a majority of the local population had come to prefer a surrender to avoid the pillage that would accompany a forcible conquest. Venice's efforts to find allies against the Ottomans also failed: the other regional potentates either pursued their own course, were themselves antagonistic to the Venetians, or were defeated by the Ottomans.

After years of inconclusive exchanges, the two sides prepared for a final confrontation in 1429. In March, Venice formally declared war on the Ottomans, but even then the conservative mercantile aristocracy running the Republic were uninterested in raising an army sufficient to protect Thessalonica, let alone to force the Sultan to seek terms. In early 1430, Murad was able to concentrate his forces against Thessalonica, taking it by storm on 29 March 1430. The privations of the siege and the subsequent sack reduced the city to a shadow of its former self, from perhaps as many as 40,000 inhabitants to c. 2,000, and necessitated large-scale resettlement in the following years. Venice concluded a peace treaty with the Sultan in July, recognising the new status quo. Over the next few decades, the antagonism between Venice and the Ottomans morphed into a rivalry over control of Albania.

== Background ==
Map of the southern Balkans and western Anatolia in 1410. Ottoman and other Turkish territories are marked in shades of brown, Byzantine territory in pink, and Venetian and Venetian-influenced areas in green

In the 14th century, the nascent Ottoman Beylik was a rising power in the Near East. After subduing much of Anatolia, with the fall of Gallipoli in 1354, the Ottoman Turks also acquired a foothold in the Balkans. The Christian powers of the region, notably the declining Byzantine Empire, were weak and divided, allowing a rapid Turkish expansion across the region, conducted both by the Ottomans themselves and by semi-independent Turkish ghazi warrior-bands. In 1369 the Ottoman Turks were able to capture Adrianople, the third-most important city of the Byzantine Empire after its capital Constantinople and Thessalonica. Thessalonica, ruled by the Byzantine prince and future emperor Manuel II Palaiologos (r. 1391–1425), itself surrendered in 1387 after a lengthy siege (1383–1387), along with the cities of Christopolis and Chrysopolis.

Initially the surrendered cities were allowed complete autonomy in exchange for payment of the haraç poll tax. Following the death of Emperor John V Palaiologos in 1391, however, Manuel II escaped Ottoman custody and went to Constantinople, where he was crowned emperor, succeeding his father. This angered Sultan Bayezid I, who laid waste to the remaining Byzantine territories, and then turned on Chrysopolis, which was captured by storm and largely destroyed. Thessalonica submitted again to Ottoman rule at this time, possibly after a brief period of resistance, (Note: The chronology and events surrounding the imposition of direct Ottoman rule on Thessalonica in the 1390s have been the subject of controversy. Doukas and Ottoman chronicles refer to a "capture" of the city, leading some modern scholars, such as Karl Hopf, Nicolae Iorga, or Raymond-Joseph Loenertz, to suggest that the city was recovered by the Byzantines in the meantime. This position is generally rejected by recent studies. Instead, the "second capture" in the 1390s is seen as part of a wider policy of strengthening central control over vassal states by Bayezid I, which is evident elsewhere in Anatolia and the Balkans at the same time. Equally contentious has been the question of dating the event to 1391 or 1394; according to Nevra Necipoğlu, scholarly consensus is now "definitively settled" on the latter date.) but was treated more leniently: although the city was brought under full Ottoman control, the Christian population and the Church retained most of their possessions, and the city retained its institutions.

Thessalonica remained in Ottoman hands until 1403, when Emperor Manuel II sided with Bayezid's eldest son Süleyman in the Ottoman succession struggle that broke out following the crushing defeat of the Ottomans and the capture of Bayezid at the Battle of Ankara against the Turco-Mongol conqueror Timur in 1402. In exchange for his support, by the Treaty of Gallipoli the Byzantine emperor secured, among other concessions, the return of Thessalonica, part of its hinterland, the Chalcidice peninsula, and the coastal region between the rivers Strymon and Pineios.

Despite the restoration of Byzantine rule, relations between Thessalonica and Constantinople remained troubled, with Thessalonica's local aristocracy jealously guarding their extensive privileges, which according to modern scholars amounted to virtual autonomy. This was part of a wider phenomenon attested for several cities during the last century of Byzantine history, as central authority weakened and centrifugal tendencies manifested themselves. In Thessalonica's case, a tendency to pursue increased independence from the imperial capital had been evident at least since the Zealot movement of the mid-14th century, and had been reinforced by Manuel II's autonomous regime in 1382–1387. Thus, after they returned to Byzantine control, Thessalonica and the surrounding region were given as an autonomous appanage to Manuel II's nephew, John VII Palaiologos. After his death in 1408, he was succeeded by Manuel's third son, the Despot, Andronikos Palaiologos, who was supervised by Demetrios Leontares until 1415. During this time, Thessalonica enjoyed a period of relative peace and prosperity, as the Turks were preoccupied with their own civil war, although it was attacked by the rival Ottoman pretenders in 1412 (by Musa Çelebi) and 1416 (during the uprising of Mustafa Çelebi against Mehmed I). Once the Ottoman civil war ended, the Turkish pressure on the city built up again. Just as during the 1383–1387 siege, this led to a sharp division of opinion within the city between factions supporting resistance, if necessary with Western European ("Latin") help, and those urging submission to the Ottomans.

== First Ottoman attacks and transfer of the city to Venice ==
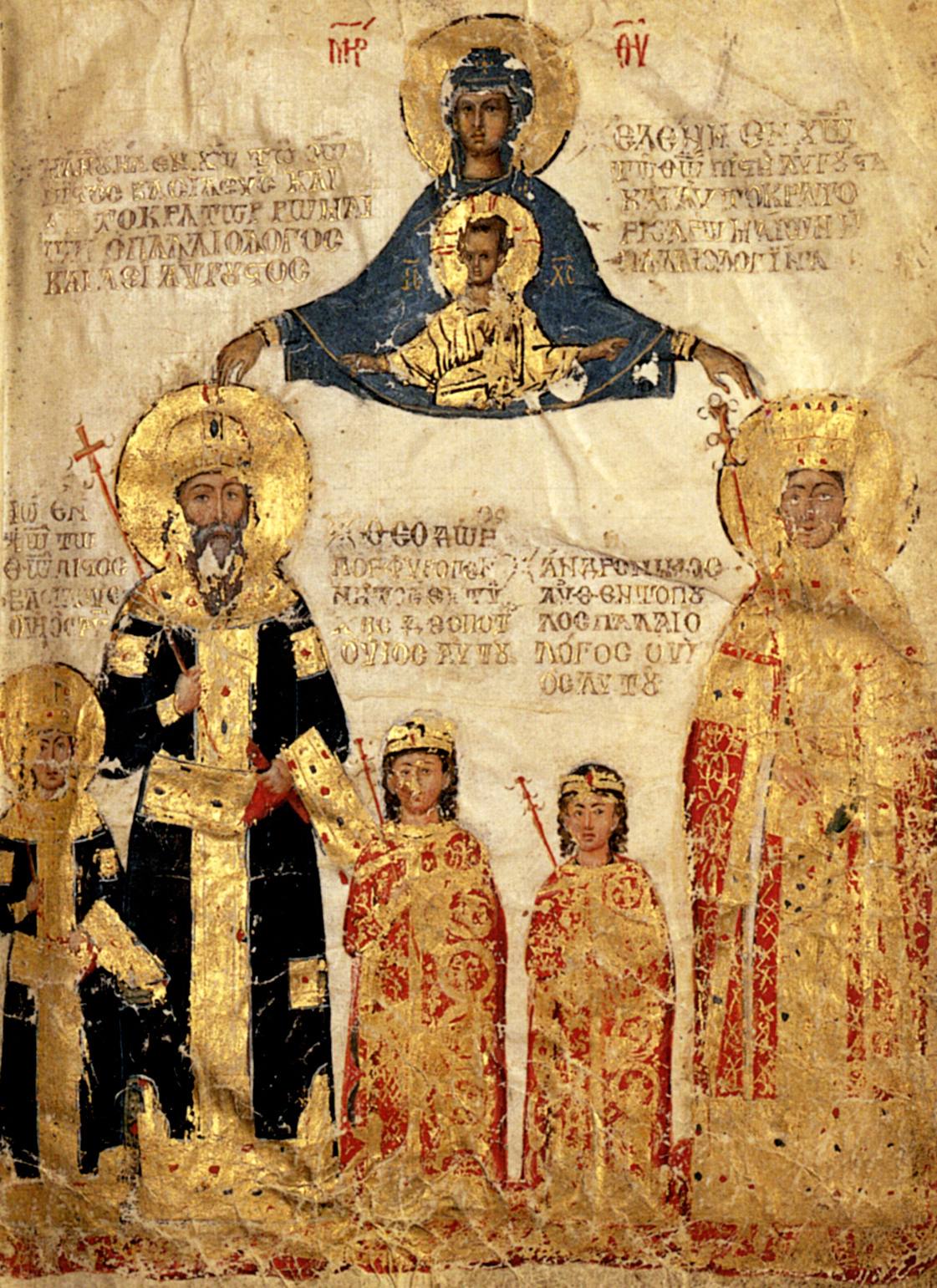
Miniature (c. 1404) showing Emperor Manuel II Palaiologos (2nd from left) with his family: his oldest son and co-emperor John VIII is first from left, while the Despot Andronikos is fourth

The eventual victor in the Ottoman civil war, Mehmed I (r. 1413–1421), maintained good relations with the Byzantines who had supported him. (Note: The Byzantines had initially supported Süleyman Çelebi during the conflict. When Musa overthrew Süleyman in 1411, he launched attacks on Thessalonica and placed Constantinople under blockade, causing the Byzantines to ally with Mehmed. Byzantine ships gave Mehmed and his forces passage over the Bosporus, Byzantine troops fought alongside him, and Constantinople served as a refuge for Mehmed following the failure of his first attack on Musa at the Battle of İnceğiz.) The accession of Murad II (r. 1422–1451) changed the situation, as John VIII Palaiologos (r. 1425–1448), the heir-apparent and de facto regent for the ailing Manuel II, set up Mustafa Çelebi as a rival to Murad. After defeating his opponent, Murad, determined to extinguish the remnants of the Byzantine state, laid siege, unsuccessfully, to Constantinople from 10 June to 6 September 1422. In June 1422, Burak Bey, the son of Evrenos, assisted by various Ottoman marcher-lords of the Balkans, besieged Thessalonica as well, and ravaged its suburbs and the western portion of Chalcidice.

According to the city's metropolitan bishop, Symeon (in office 1416/17–1429), both he and Despot Andronikos sent repeated pleas for aid to Constantinople, but the imperial government was short of resources and preoccupied with its own problems. Eventually, a single unnamed commander was sent to the city, but he brought neither men nor money with him. This commander proposed setting up a common fund of the citizens to support the defence, but this proposal met with vehement opposition, particularly from the wealthy aristocrats, who would naturally have borne the brunt of the cost. The common people likewise proved unwilling to contribute; when the news spread that the Ottomans had offered a peaceful settlement, provided that Despot Andronikos left the city, the commoners even rioted in favour of an accommodation with the Ottomans.

At that point a group of aristocrats persuaded the Despot to seek the assistance of the Republic of Venice, an initiative probably taken without consulting Constantinople. In spring 1423, via the Venetian colony of Negroponte, he informed the Venetians of his intention to hand over the city to them. When he informed the Venetians, they were appalled. The only conditions Andronikos attached to his offer were that the property, customs and privileges of the city's inhabitants, their right to trade and come and go freely, and the position of the city's Orthodox Church be respected, and that Venice pledge to defend the city against the Ottomans. The 16th-century chronicler Pseudo-Sphrantzes claims that Andronikos sold the city for 50,000 ducats, and this statement was often accepted by scholars until the mid-20th century. This is not mentioned in any other source, nor is it found in the original documents pertaining to the affair, as shown by the scholars Konstantinos Mertzios and Paul Lemerle. On the other hand, the Venetian envoys appointed to oversee the handover were authorised to provide a sum of 20,000–40,000 aspers (Note: The asper usually refers to the Ottoman akçe (earlier valued at 10 to one Venetian ducat). Its value declined rapidly due to an increasingly lower silver content, so that by the middle of the 15th century, a ducat was valued at 40–50 aspers.) from the revenue of the city as a yearly subsidy to Andronikos, should he request it.

The offer arrived in Venice at an opportune time. The election of Francesco Foscari on 15 April 1423 as Doge of Venice had placed a proponent of a more aggressive and unyielding stance against Ottoman expansionism at the head of the Republic. But the majority of the Great Council of Venice was still dominated by the more cautious tendencies of the merchant nobility that ruled the Republic and they feared the disruption to trade that open war with the Ottomans would bring. Since the Fourth Crusade, the Venetians had consciously adopted a policy of gradually acquiring outposts, fortresses and islands from the collapsing Byzantine Empire, providing bases that secured Venice's valuable trading links with the East. For some time Venice had viewed Thessalonica as a possible expansion target, especially as Constantinople seemed to be on the verge of falling to the Turks. Thus in 1419, Venice re-established a consulate in the city, headed by a local Greek, George Philomati, and after his death in 1422 by his brother Demetrios.

At a session of the Great Council on 7 July 1423, Andronikos' offer was accepted. The council sent notices to the Venetian colonies in the Aegean Sea (Negroponte, Nauplia, Tinos and Mykonos) and the vassal Duke of Naxos, to prepare ships to take possession of the city, while the Republic's bailo at Constantinople was instructed to secure the assent of Emperor Manuel. A week later Santo Venier and Niccolo Giorgio were named provveditori (plenipotentiary envoys) and tasked with going to Greece and, if Despot Andronikos were still willing, taking over the city and arranging for its defence by hiring mercenaries. Giorgio was then to go before the Sultan, inform him of Venice's acquisition of the city and justify it as an expedient to prevent the city from being captured by other Christians, who might be hostile to the Sultan. The envoys were also to arrange for peace both between the Sultan and the Republic, and between the Sultan and Emperor Manuel. Emperor Manuel evidently gave his assent to the proposal, for on 14 September 1423 six Venetian galleys, accompanied by one Byzantine galley, entered the harbour of Thessalonica. The Venetians were greeted by a jubilant population as saviours. For the Thessalonians Venetian rule meant not only security from the Turks (some 5,000 Ottoman troops were blockading the landward city walls) but, more immediately, a secure flow of supplies.

Nevertheless, large segments of the population continued to support the seeking of a settlement with the Ottomans; the writings of Metropolitan Symeon record that a number of inhabitants fled at this time to the Ottomans. This sentiment even included some members of the nobility: the contemporary Byzantine historian Doukas records that soon after taking over the city, the Venetians imprisoned four leading aristocrats, led by a certain Platyskalites, for their association with the Ottomans. The four men were exiled, first to Crete, and then to Venice itself and finally to Padua. Only after the fall of Thessalonica in 1430 were the two survivors released. The contemporary Venetian Morosini Codex records a story of a conspiracy – dismissed as "slanderous" by Donald Nicol – led by Despot Andronikos to hand over the city to the Turks. The plot was reportedly discovered in November 1423, and Andronikos and his supporters were exiled, with the Despot sent to Nauplia. (Note: The Byzantine sources do not mention Andronikos' involvement in a conspiracy, and record different fates for him: Laonikos Chalkokondyles records that he went to Mantineia in the Morea, where he died; Theodore Spandounes writes that he sailed for Venice but died during the journey; Sphrantzes claims that he became a monk in the Pantokrator Monastery in Constantinople, where he died in 1429 and was buried next to his father; a number of other sources, including Pseudo-Sphrantzes, claim that he became a monk in Mount Athos, where he died.)

== Diplomatic and military events ==
=== Initial Venetian and Ottoman approaches ===
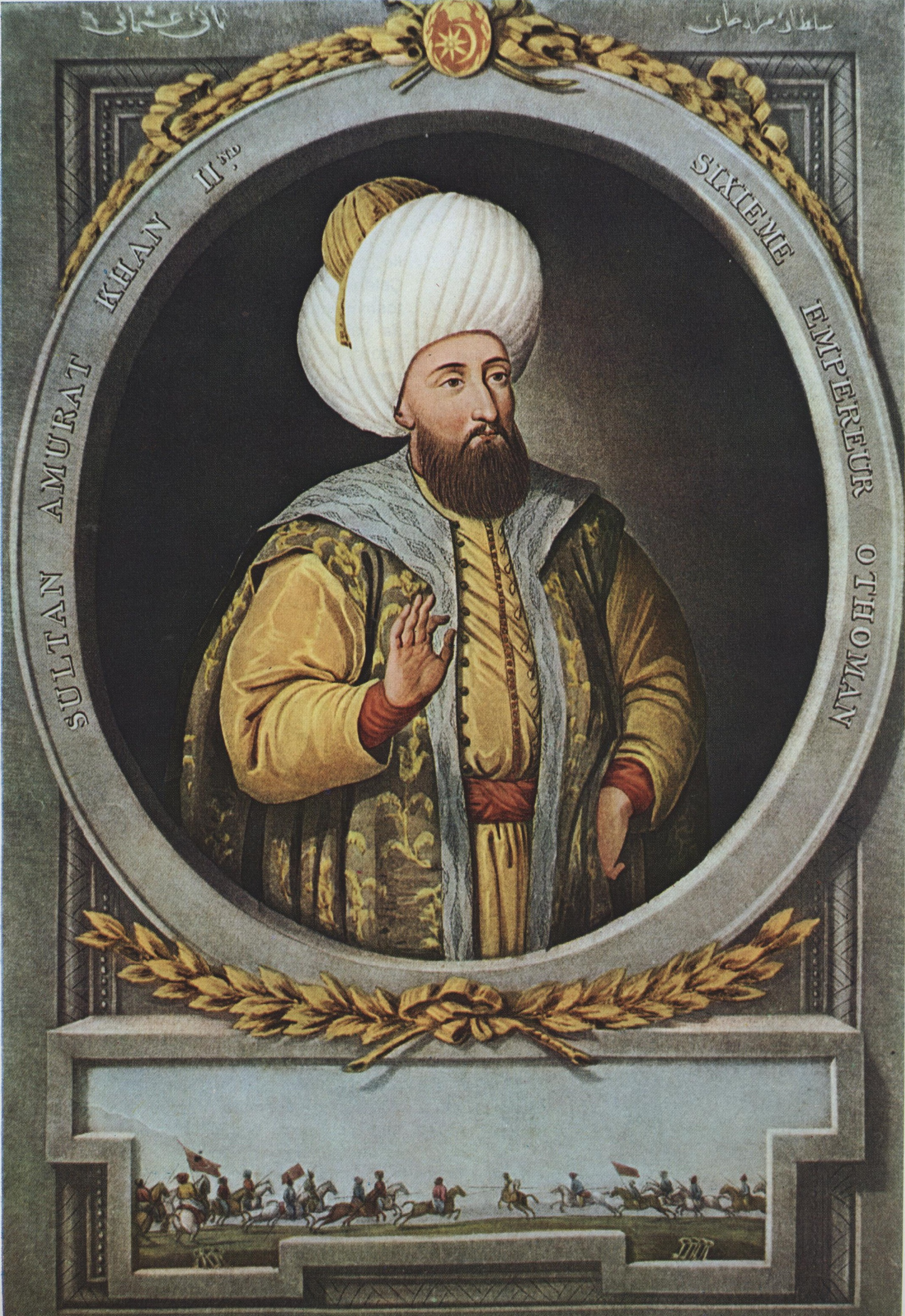
Ottoman sultan Murad II as depicted in an idealised 19th-century portrait by Konstantin Kapıdağlı

The Venetians hoped to secure Ottoman consent to the occupation of Thessalonica. However, when the provveditore Giorgio attempted to carry out his mission to the Sultan's court, probably in February 1424, he was unsuccessful to the point of being arrested and imprisoned by Murad. The Ottomans refused to accept the handover, considering the Venetian presence illegal on account of their previous right to the city through conquest. The Ottoman attitude was summed up by the reply allegedly given by Murad to Venetian ambassadors seeking peace, as recorded by Doukas:

This city is my paternal property. My grandfather Bayazid, by the might of his hand, wrested her from the Romans [the Byzantines]. Had the Romans prevailed over me, they would have cause to exclaim, 'He is unjust!' But you are Latins from Italy, why have you trespassed into these parts? You have the choice of withdrawing. If you do not, I will come posthaste.

— Sultan Murad II to the Venetian envoys, Doukas, Historia Turco-Byzantina XXIX.5

When news of Giorgio's arrest arrived in Venice, the Great Council decided to replace both him and Venier. The first two choices for replacement, Jacopo Trevisan and Fantino Michiel, refused, but in May 1424, Bernardo Loredan was named duke (governor) of the city, with Jacopo Dandolo as captain (military commander), for a two-year term. In the meantime, Venier was instructed to secure the release of Giorgio, and recognition from the Sultan of Venetian control over Thessalonica, the surrounding villages, and the fort of Kortiach (Chortiatis). In exchange, he was to offer an annual tribute of 1,000 to 2,000 ducats, and to distribute annuities to the Sultan's chief courtiers. The same instructions were given to the new captain-general of the fleet, Pietro Loredan, who sailed for Thessalonica. If he found the city under siege, Loredan was to attack Gallipoli (where he had scored a major victory in 1416), hinder the passage of Ottoman troops over the Dardanelles, and if practicable, to try and stir up opposition to the Sultan among neighbouring rulers. To emphasise the fact that Venice did not desire war, Loredan was instructed to inform the local Turkish commanders that his actions were only as a consequence of the imprisonment of Giorgio and the siege of Thessalonica, which they had acquired legally.

This set the pattern for the six-year conflict between the Ottomans and Venice over control of Thessalonica. While the Ottomans blockaded and attacked Thessalonica from land, trying to starve it into surrender, the Republic sent repeated embassies to secure recognition of her possession of Thessalonica in exchange for an annual tribute. To back up their diplomatic efforts, the Venetians tried to put pressure on the Sultan by stirring up trouble along the Ottomans' periphery, sponsoring efforts for an anti-Ottoman crusade, and sending their fleet to attack Gallipoli. The Ottomans likewise tried to distract Venice by launching raids of their own on Venetian possessions in the Aegean.

The Venetians had a possible and willing ally in the person of Junayd, ruler of the Turkish Aydinid principality in central western Anatolia. Junayd was a capable and energetic ruler who tried to form a broad anti-Ottoman alliance with another Turkish principality, the Karamanids of central Anatolia, and to renew the Ottoman civil war by sending another Ottoman prince, Ismail, to Rumelia (the Ottoman-ruled part of the Balkans). In the course of this conflict, Murad allied himself with Venice's rival, the Republic of Genoa, to blockade the coasts of Junayd's domain and prevent Ismail from setting sail. Junayd was finally subdued in spring 1425, depriving Venice of his assistance. In February 1424, Murad concluded a peace with the Byzantines, who returned almost all the lands they had gained in 1403 and, reduced to Constantinople and its environs, became tributary vassals to the Ottomans once more.

Efforts at a crusade, meanwhile, faltered on the persistent rivalry of Venice and the King of Hungary, Sigismund, the protagonist of the failed anti-Ottoman Crusade of Nicopolis in 1396, over possession of Dalmatia. Both Venice and Hungary attempted to exploit the momentary Ottoman weakness and the resulting turmoil in the Balkans to expand their territories – Venice in Dalmatia and Albania, Sigismund in Bosnia, Serbia, and Wallachia. Venice seized Zara, Split, and other Dalmatian cities from Hungary between 1412 and 1420. This policy brought the Republic into conflict with the Despot of Serbia, Stefan Lazarević (r. 1389–1427) between 1420 and 1423, forcing the latter to seek the aid of the Ottomans. The Emperors Manuel II and John VIII, along with the King of Poland, Władysław II Jagiełło, tried to effect a reconciliation between Venice and Sigismund, but in vain. It was only in 1425, when Murad II, freed from threats to his Anatolian possessions, went on the counter-offensive, that Venice itself recognised the necessity of an alliance with Sigismund. Nevertheless, despite additional pressure for a rapprochement from Savoy and Florence, Sigismund refused. This dispute allowed the Ottomans to bring Serbia and Bosnia back into vassalage, and after Murad stopped Sigismund's advance at the Siege of Golubac in 1428, a truce was arranged between the two powers.

=== 1425 ===
In the meantime, despite the activities of Loredan around Gallipoli, the situation in Thessalonica was so dire by October 1424 that the Great Council had to authorise the dispatch to the city of between 150 and 200 soldiers, as well as supplies and money. On 13 January 1425, the Venetians decided to equip 25 galleys, an unusually large and expensive undertaking, for the next year; Fantino Michiel was appointed captain-general. (Note: At this time, Venice had no standing fleet. Every winter, the standing committees of the Great Council of Venice established the annual orders for the so-called "guard fleet", or "fleet of the Gulf [the Adriatic Sea]". The Great Council then voted on the proposals, the size of the fleet, and the appointment of a captain-general and the galley captains (sopracomiti) for the galleys to be outfitted in Venice. The commanders of the galleys equipped by Venetian colonies were decided by the local colonists.) The fleet sailed in April 1425, and was tasked both with settling affairs in the Venetian colonies and with reassuring the Thessalonians of Venetian support. Michiel was also instructed to make contact with the Sultan and pledge considerable sums to the Grand Vizier, Çandarlı Ibrahim Pasha, and other members of the Ottoman court, to gain a sympathetic hearing. The Republic proposed to restore the salt pans that the Sultan had previously controlled, as well as the tribute of 100,000 aspers that Despot Andronikos had paid. The Venetians refused, however, to allow the Turks in the city to be tried by their own kadi, as had been the case under Andronikos, and insisted on the reinstatement of customs posts at the city gates. Michiel was further tasked with securing the release of Venetian citizens taken during an Ottoman raid into the Morea the previous March, and re-confirming the previous peace treaty of 1419, including, if possible, the restitution of the Marquisate of Bodonitsa to its ruler, Niccolo III Zorzi.

In July 1425, ten Venetian galleys under Michiel undertook an expedition east along the shores of Macedonia: the Venetians found Ierissos abandoned by its Ottoman garrison, but full of provisions, which they loaded onto their ships. After setting fire to the town and five other forts in the vicinity, the fleet moved onto Christopolis. The Venetians found the castle held by a 400-strong force of Ottoman sipahis, under the command of Ismail Bey. The first attempt to land, led by Alvise Loredan, was repulsed, and only after all the ships mustered their forces were the Venetians able to overcome Ottoman resistance in a four-hour-long battle: 41 Turks were killed, including Ismail Bey, and 30 taken prisoner. After strengthening the site with a stone wall and earthworks, and leaving a garrison of 80 foot soldiers and 50 crossbowmen to hold it, the fleet departed. The Turks soon returned with a larger force of 10,000–12,000 men, and after about twenty days, and despite losing around 800 men, the Ottomans stormed the castle. Unable to escape, half the Venetians were killed and the rest taken prisoner.

On 21 July 1425, Manuel II died, and John VIII formally became Emperor. In response Murad, who was deeply hostile towards John, launched his forces on raids around Thessalonica and Zetouni (Lamia) in Central Greece. At the same time, the Greeks of Thessalonica sent an embassy to the Great Council to complain of violations of their rights by the duke and captain. Among other things, they insisted that the Venetians fortify Kassandreia on the western Chalcidice, to protect the Kassandra Peninsula from Ottoman raids. In response, Michiel occupied the fort of Kassandreia, which he refortified and strengthened by the construction of two smaller forts in the area. He then captured the Platamon Castle, on the opposite side of the Thermaic Gulf, by storm, after setting fire to its main bailey when the Ottoman garrison refused to surrender. Platamon was repaired but probably abandoned soon after, for it is not mentioned again. Following Michiel's request, the Great Council sent 200 men from Padua to man Thessalonica and the forts of Kassandreia, and authorised the captain-general to maintain four galleys in the area. From his letters to the Great Council, it appears that Michiel was simultaneously engaged in negotiations with the Ottomans, as part of which he offered 20,000 aspers a year to the Ottoman governor of Thessaly, Turahan Bey, and to the Grand Vizier. At the same time, according to the Codex Morosini, a pretender claiming to be Mustafa Çelebi (Note: After his defeat by Murad in 1421/22, Mustafa tried to escape but was recognised and brought to Adrianople, where he was hanged. It is possible, however, that he did manage to escape to Wallachia, and thence to Caffa. If so, the Mustafa present at Thessalonica may indeed have been the Ottoman prince.) arrived in Thessalonica, and gathered a growing following of Turks who considered him to be the true son of Sultan Bayezid. Pseudo-Mustafa launched raids against Murad's forces from the city, but after both Mustafa and the Venetian captain were almost captured during one of these actions, on 3 September 1425 the Great Council issued instructions to stop such raids, and keep the gates of the city shut.

=== 1426–1427 ===
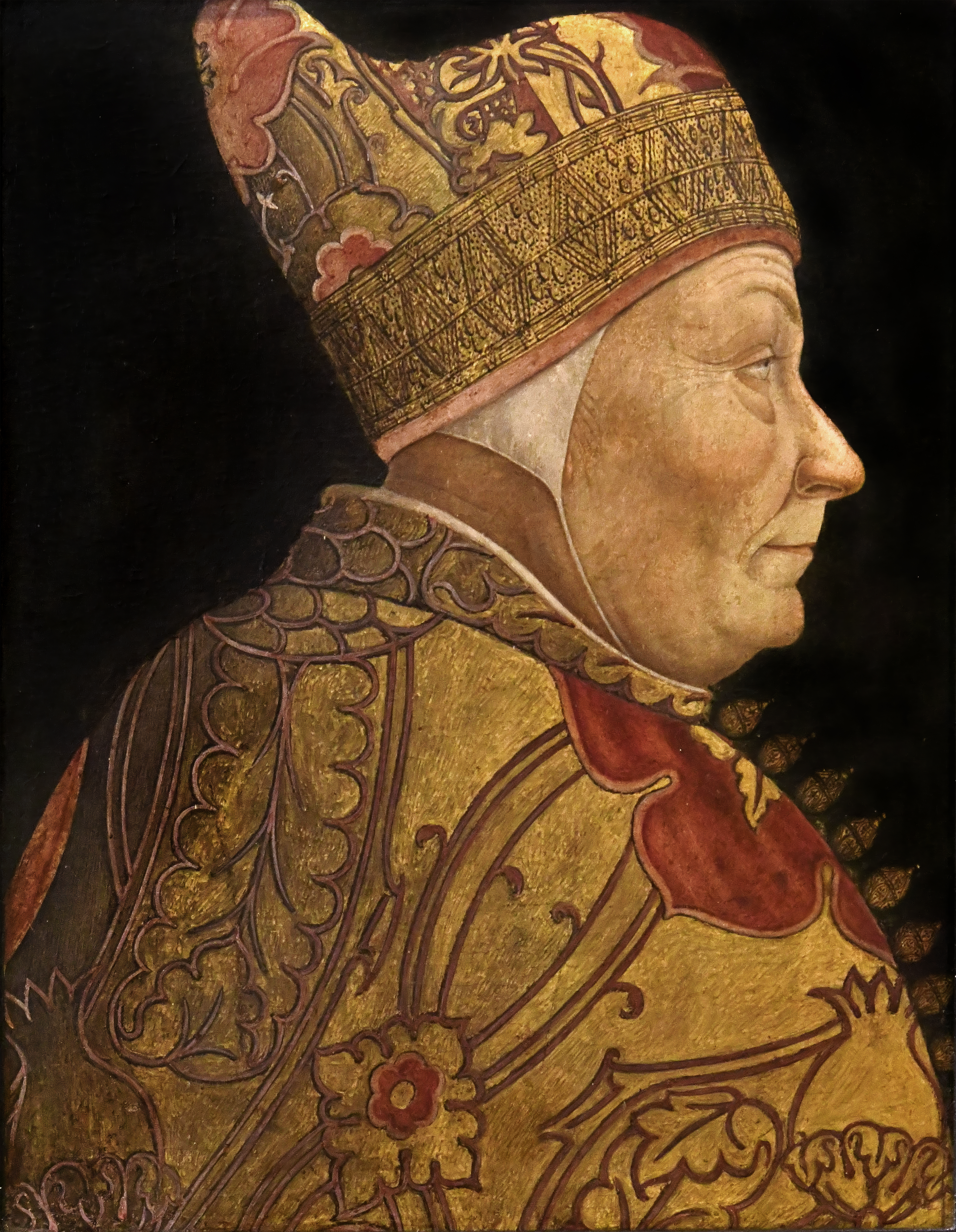
Francesco Foscari, Doge of Venice throughout the conflict. Portrait (1457–1460) by Lazzaro Bastiani

In April 1426, Michiel came near to a settlement with the Ottoman governor at Gallipoli, whereby the Republic would keep Thessalonica in exchange for 100,000 aspers a year, the right of disputes between Turks in the city to be settled by their own kadi, and free and untaxed movement of merchants to and from the city. The negotiations foundered again, however, as the Ottomans insisted on their control of Kassandra and Chortiatis, which they intended as springboards for the eventual conquest of the city. At the same time, the Ottomans launched a major attack on the city with reportedly 30,000 men, but the presence of five Venetian galleys in the city, possibly armed with small cannons, helped the defenders repel the attack. According to the report of Loredan and Dandolo to the Great Council, 700 crossbowmen manned the walls, and over 2,000 Turks were killed before the assault failed.

On 6 May 1426, a new duke and captain for the city were elected: Paolo Trevisan and Paolo Orio. In July 1426, the new Venetian captain-general, Andrea Mocenigo, was instructed to resume negotiations, but concede to the Ottomans possession of Kassandra and Chortiatis. On the other hand, the peace settlement should be comprehensive, including the Latin lords of the Aegean, who were Venetian citizens and clients. Failing that, Mocenigo was to attack Gallipoli. In August, the Despot of Serbia, Stefan Lazarević, offered his services as mediator. On 28 November 1426, Mocenigo managed to receive Murad's agreement to a peace treaty on the broad lines of the agreement proposed by Michiel, except that Venice would pay an annual tribute of 150,000 aspers and increased annuities for senior members of the Ottoman court, and would surrender Chortiatis. Despite the Republic's desire to conclude a peace treaty, the months and years dragged on without an agreement. Benedetto Emo, appointed ambassador to the Sultan in July 1427 with the express purpose of ratifying the treaty, was replaced in August 1428 by Jacopo Dandolo. Dandolo was instructed, if necessary, to offer a further increase of the tribute to 300,000 aspers, and a total sum of gifts from 10,000–15,000 ducats and a further 2,000 ducats as annuities; further sums could be offered in exchange for possession of the environs of Thessalonica, Kassandra, and the salt works. Dandolo did not have any more success than his predecessor: the Sultan demanded of him the surrender of Thessalonica, and when Dandolo replied that he did not have authority to do this, the Sultan had him thrown in prison, where he was left to die.

=== 1428–1429 ===
Throughout the confrontation over Thessalonica, the Ottomans launched constant raids against Venetian possessions in Albania. In early spring 1428, the Ottoman fleet launched a major raid against Venetian possessions in Greece: 40 to 65 vessels raided the island of Euboea and took about 700 Venetian citizens prisoner, before going on to raid the environs of the two Venetian outposts of Modon and Coron in the southwestern Morea. When news arrived in Venice on 22 April 1428, even though the previous year's guard fleet under Guido da Canal was still abroad, a guard fleet of 15 galleys was authorised to hunt the Ottoman raiders, under Andrea Mocenigo. In the event, the new fleet did not sail until September, after Canal's fleet was defeated at Gallipoli by a coalition of Ottoman and Christian ships. The Ottoman naval threat became particularly acute at this time due to the defection of the Duke of Naxos, Giovanni II Crispo (r. 1418–1433). Although a Venetian citizen and vassal of the Republic, mounting Ottoman pressure on his possessions had forced the Great Council to authorise him to enter into a separate peace treaty with the Ottomans, which Crispo duly did. As a result, Crispo was forced to effectively assist the Turks in their own raids, and ceased signalling the Venetians in Euboea of impending Ottoman raids via beacons. In early March 1429, an Ottoman fleet even appeared before Thessalonica, and captured two Venetian vessels.

According to the Venetian senator Andrea Suriano, Venice spent on average 60,000 ducats per year in this seemingly fruitless conflict, but the Venetians themselves were hesitant to commit their resources fully to Thessalonica; its proximity to the centre of Ottoman power made their ability to retain it doubtful in the long term, while at the same time, closer to home, Venice was pursuing a conflict with the Duchy of Milan over control of northern Italy. The Republic had long tried to avoid declaring war on the Ottomans, but now it had little choice: Dandolo's imprisonment, the increasing Ottoman naval threat (with the open assistance of the Genoese colonies at Chios and Lesbos), in conjunction with the end of their war with Hungary, made clear to the Venetians that the Sultan was preparing to settle the question of Thessalonica by force. As a result, on 29 March 1429, the Great Council voted an official declaration of war against the Sultan, and ordered more ships to be activated to join the fleet.

On 11 May 1429, the pretender Mustafa appeared before the Great Council, and was given a gift of 150 ducats for his services. On 4 June a new duke and captain were elected for Thessalonica, Paolo Contarini and Andrea Donato, after the first three pairs chosen all declined the post, despite the fine attached to refusal; a clear indication of the unwillingness of the Venetian nobles to undertake this unprofitable and perilous task. On 1 July 1429, Mocenigo attacked the Ottoman ships at Gallipoli, but although he led his flagship to break through the palisade protecting the Ottoman anchorage, the other Venetian vessels did not follow, forcing Mocenigo to withdraw with heavy casualties. Even at this point, Venice would not commit its full force to the conflict: when Suriano, as a proponent of the hawkish faction, proposed to arm a fleet of 14 ships and engage in a more decisive policy against the Ottomans in January 1430, the proposal was voted down, even though it was rather modest and clearly inadequate to force the Sultan to come to terms. Instead, the Great Council instructed the new captain-general, Silvestro Morosini, to seek the mediation of the Byzantine Emperor for a settlement on the lines of the previous agreements.

Aware of their own weakness, the Venetians tried to form alliances with other regional rulers who feared Ottoman expansionism. Taking advantage of the Ottomans' preoccupation with the Siege of Golubac, Ibrahim II of Karaman (r. 1424–1464) had managed to gain control of the area of Hamid, and in August 1429, through the mediation of King Janus of Cyprus (r. 1398–1432), the Venetians approached Ibrahim for an alliance against Murad. Rather than resulting in a military alliance, however, the prospect of a Venetian–Cypriot–Karamanid league served to bring the Ottomans closer with the other great Muslim power of the Eastern Mediterranean, the Mamluks of Egypt, and initiate a period where the two states made common cause against Latin presence in the area. The Venetians also tried to influence Murad towards a peace with the threat posed by the ambitions of Timur's son Shahrukh, especially after the latter's defeat of the Kara Koyunlu in September 1429 brought him within striking distance of the Ottomans' Anatolian domains: contemporary rumour ascribed to him not only a desire to restore his father's dominance over the region, but to cross the Ottoman territories into Rumelia, and return to Azerbaijan via the northern shore of the Black Sea. In the event, Shahrukh retired to winter in Azerbaijan, whereupon Murad ordered his general Hamza Bey to lead his forces from Anatolia to Europe in February 1430, and sent him against Thessalonica.

== Thessalonica under Venetian rule ==
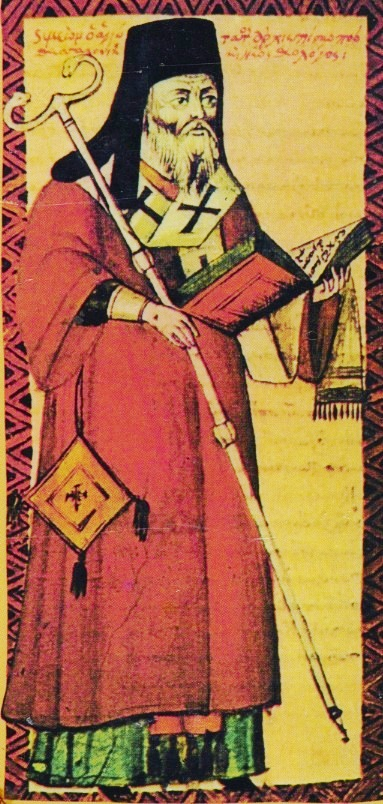
Metropolitan Symeon of Thessalonica, miniature from an 18th-century codex

Inside Thessalonica, the siege led to much suffering, and the populace quickly became dissatisfied with their new masters. By the winter of 1426–1427, conditions in the besieged city approached the point of famine. The Thessalonians were forced to subsist on bread alone, and even that proved problematic: The authorities were forced to request more shipments of wheat from Venice when supplies ran dangerously low. The conditions of "extreme poverty, death, and destitution" made the Greek population more and more restless, and even those who had formerly welcomed the Venetians began to waver. The lack of food even jeopardised the city's defences, since many of the mercenary guards on the walls, paid by Venice with wheat instead of cash, defected to the Turks when their rations were late. This situation became progressively worse, and by the time of the final Ottoman attack in 1430, many soldiers had no weapons because they had sold them for food.

The privations of the siege led to an exodus of the city's population, as citizens with the ability to leave sold their possessions and fled to Constantinople, other Venetian-controlled Greek territories, or to the Turks. From a population variously reported at 20–25 thousand, or even as many as forty thousand by contemporary Italian sources, it is estimated that only ten to thirteen thousand were left by 1430. The Venetian authorities tried to put a stop to this by prohibiting the inhabitants from leaving the city, outlawing "all sales, mortgages, and transfers of property, both movable and immovable", and destroying the houses and other property – even trees – of people who had left the city. They hoped that the destruction would serve a deterrent to those who remained behind. Coupled with several instances of arbitrariness, speculation, and profiteering on behalf of the Venetian authorities, these measures helped to further alienate the Thessalonians. By April 1425, a Byzantine church official who had had his family flee the city wrote of the "enslavement of the city by the Venetians", and similar sentiments about Venetian tyranny are echoed in all contemporary Byzantine sources. In their embassy in July 1425, the Thessalonians submitted a list of 21 complaints and demands, including fixed rations of corn for the poor and the lowering of tax dues and suspension of arrears and debt-related punishments for the duration of the siege, since the closing of the gates meant that people could no longer access their fields, which were furthermore devastated by the Turks. In a session on 23 July 1425, the Great Council acceded to many of their demands and requested that its officials respect the customs and rights of the citizens and work together with the local council of twelve nobles in the governance of the city.

Whatever the Venetian efforts to secure peace, the Thessalonians were well aware, in the words of the Byzantinist Donald Nicol, that Murad "was playing for time" and he "was never going to be reconciled to the Venetian occupation of the Thessalonica". As the historian Apostolos Vacalopoulos put it, the prevailing view quickly became that "since Thessalonica was bound sooner or later to fall into Turkish hands, it would be preferable to surrender peacefully there and then, and so avoid the sufferings which would ensue if the Turks had to take the city by force." As conditions inside the city worsened, the pro-surrender current gained ground among the Thessalonians. This is evidenced from the writings of Metropolitan Symeon, who recounts that during one attack in 1425 or 1426, many citizens (including some of those guarding the walls) fled to the Ottomans. Symeon played an important role as a spokesman and leader of the city's populace during the siege. An ardently Hesychast and anti-Latin prelate who had opposed the handover of the city to the Roman Catholic Venetians, fearing their "corrupting" influence, the Metropolitan tried to strengthen his flock's Orthodox identity against both the Latin Venetians and the Muslim Turks, as well as awaken their will to resist. He organised litanies that paraded the city's icon of the Hodegetria, and delivered sermons about the city's successful delivery from previous sieges through the intervention of her patron, Demetrius of Thessalonica. As a result, he emerged as the leading proponent of resistance, and despite his anti-Latin animus, the Venetians considered him "a most loyal servant of the Republic". His death in September 1429 contributed to the increasing demoralisation of the city's populace, who considered it an omen of the city's fall.

In summer 1429, the Thessalonians sent a second embassy to Venice to complain about the restrictions placed on entry and exit from the city, continued violations of their rights, extortion by the Venetian authorities, the poor supply situation, the neglect of repairing the city's fortifications and the lack of military stores, and the Venetian mercenaries who were in contact with the Turks outside the walls. On 14 July 1429, the Great Council gave mostly reassuring answers to a list of 31 demands, but the increasing dissatisfaction by the Greek population with Venetian rule was evident. The eyewitness John Anagnostes reports that by the winter of 1429, the majority of the population had come to favour a surrender to the Turks. Sultan Murad was aware of the situation inside the walls, and twice sent Christian officers in his service into the city to incite a rebellion against the Venetians. However, as Anagnostes writes, the population was by that time so reduced in number, and divided among itself, that no common cause could be made. Furthermore, the Thessalonians were afraid of the Venetians, as they had recruited a special force of guards, the Tzetarioi, and given them the authority to kill anyone advocating a surrender.

== Fall of the city ==
A squadron of three galleys under Antonio Diedo arrived to reinforce the city on 17 March 1430, but to little avail. A muster of the city's available defenders showed that they sufficed to man only a half or a third of the crenelles, and they were deficient in both armament and morale. News of Murad's approach at the head of an army rumoured to number 190,000 men caused widespread terror among the populace.

The Sultan appeared before the city on Sunday, 26 March 1430, shortly after noon. Probably informed of the discontent inside the walls by Greek defectors, the Sultan appears to have expected the mere appearance of his army to force the city to surrender, or to signal an uprising of the populace against the Venetian garrison. In this vein he sent Christian officers to the walls, to call upon the inhabitants to surrender, but they were driven off by arrows from the walls before they had chance to complete their speeches. The Sultan then began preparations to take the city by storm, which lasted for three days. On the 28th, Murad sent another offer of surrender, but this too was rejected. On the same night, a subaltern officer entered the city to inform the Venetian commanders that the Turks had prepared six ships at the Vardar River for use against the Venetian galleys in the harbour, which had been left defenceless since all available forces were concentrated in manning the city wall. Fearing that their retreat would be cut off, the Venetian commanders ordered Diedo and his men to withdraw from the wall to man the ships and the harbour defences. They did not, however, notify the population, and around midnight, Christians from the Ottoman camp approached the walls and announced that the final assault would take place the next day, from land and sea. The news spread throughout the city and panicked the populace, who spent the night in terrified vigil in the churches. The panic spread further when Diedo's withdrawal to the harbour became known. In the absence of other information, the Thessalonians believed that the Venetians were preparing to abandon them and flee. As a result, a number of defenders simply abandoned their positions on the walls and returned to their homes.

At dawn on 29 March 1430, (Note: The dating of the city's fall has been the subject of several erroneous interpretations, but the correct date is provided by John Anagnostes, the report by the Venetian authorities of Negroponte on the city's fall, and a Greek letter found in the Vlatades Monastery. Some earlier Western and Turkish historians, such as Marc-Antoine Laugier and Leunclavius, as well as some early 20th-century sources (like the Italian Treccani encyclopaedia), erroneously place the year of the city's capture in 1429, while Le Quien placed it in 1431. The Austrian orientalist Joseph von Hammer-Purgstall gave the date as 1 March, without citing any source, while some Venetian historians placed it on 13 March.) the Ottomans launched their attack under the command of Sinan Pasha, the beylerbey (military governor) of Rumelia. The main weight of the attack fell on the less well maintained eastern section of the walls, between the Trigonion and the site of the later Heptapyrgion fortress, where the Sultan himself led the attack. The Ottomans brought siege engines, ladders, and planks forward, and used them to undermine the walls. Ottoman archery proved crucial, for their shots were able to pin down the defenders and hit many who tried to peer over the battlements. As a result, much of the defenders' return fire was blind, and they began slowly abandoning their positions. Finally, at the fourth hour, the Ottoman troops broke through at multiple points along the wall; according to Anagnostes, the first Ottomans climbed the wall in the eastern section, which had been left almost defenceless. (Note: According to local oral tradition, the city fell due to treachery on the part of the monks of the Vlatades Monastery, who advised the Sultan to cut the underground pipes providing the city with water from Mount Chortiatis, just as the Sultan was despairing and preparing to raise the siege. No indication of such an event survives in historical sources, but the tale probably reflects the willingness of a large part of the populace to surrender to the Turks.) As the civilian population was being massacred, the Venetians fled to the harbour as best as they could – "one in his mantle, the other in his undershirt" in the words of the report to the Great Council. Many managed to escape to Diedo's ships, and thence to Negroponte. Others were less fortunate: the Venetians lost over 270 men from the galley crews alone. A number of senior officials, including the son of duke Paolo Contarini, and Leonardo Gradenigo, captain of one of the galleys, also fell. Details on the siege were provided by a letter sent by the Venetians of Negroponte to Venice on 2 April 1430, after the refugees from the fall of the city arrived there, and the eyewitness account of John Anagnostes. On their return to Venice, the two Venetian commanders of Thessalonica faced charges of negligence and were imprisoned; they were most likely acquitted, however, for by 1432 both were once again active in the Republic's politics.

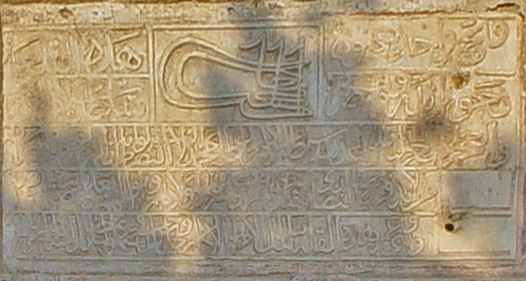
Foundation inscription with the tughra of Murad II on the Heptapyrgion fortress, built in 1431 on the northeastern corner of the city

Following long-standing custom for a city taken by storm, the plundering lasted for three days. According to Anagnostes, 7,000 inhabitants, (Note: Modern researches consider this figure to be approximately the total number of the city's inhabitants on the eve of the Ottoman conquest.) including himself, were taken captive to be sold in the slave markets of the Balkans and Anatolia to slavery in the Ottoman Empire, although many were subsequently ransomed by the Despot of Serbia, Đurađ Branković. The city's monuments suffered heavy damage in the sack, particularly the cathedral of Hagios Demetrios, as soldiers ransacked them for precious objects and hidden treasure. This damage was compounded later when the Sultan ordered that marble sections be stripped from them and taken to his capital, Adrianople, to pave a bath. On the fourth day, Sultan Murad entered the city himself and prayed at the Church of the Acheiropoietos, which became the city's first mosque. The Sultan then restored order, evicting the soldiers from the homes they had occupied and returning them to their owners. Only two thousand of the population were left after the sack. The Sultan soon took measures to repopulate the city. He promised to return their properties to those inhabitants who had fled if they returned, and in some cases even ransomed captives from the sack himself. In addition, he brought in Muslim and Christian settlers from other areas of Macedonia. (Note: These efforts were slow to bear fruit: by c. 1450, there were only a thousand Christians and Muslims each in the city. By 1478, the Muslim population had grown to 4,000, but very few of them were local converts; the large majority came from Anatolia or other Balkan urban centres.) A great number of empty houses were confiscated and given to the settlers, while most of the main churches were converted to mosques. The Turks settled mostly in the upper part of the city, from where they could better control it.

== Aftermath ==
The Venetians were taken by surprise when the city fell; the fleet under Morosini was still sailing off the western coast of Greece. Following their customary strategy, they reacted by sending their fleet to blockade Gallipoli and cut off passage of the Dardanelles. However, the Republic was by now ready to disengage itself from this profitless venture, (Note: Various estimates have been given in the sources on the total cost of the conflict to Venice: apart from Suriano's claim of over 60,000 ducats per year, the Codex Morosini reports that the entire conflict cost 740,000 ducats, with its author claiming that he himself saw the accounts supporting this figure; Marino Sanudo claims a figure of 700,000, probably following Morosini; the Zancaruola Chronicle places the sum at 502,000 ducats, and other chronicles record still lower sums of 300,000 and 200,000 ducats.) and soon instructed Morosini to seek peace. In July, Hamza Bey signed a peace treaty with the Venetians (ratified on 4 September 1430) whereby Venice recognised its loss of Thessalonica, restored passage of the Dardanelles, and acknowledged Ottoman overlordship over Patras in the Morea, with an annual tribute of 236 ducats. In exchange, the Venetians secured the Sultan's recognition of their possessions in Albania: Durazzo, Scutari, and Antivari.

Following the capture of Thessalonica, the Ottomans went on to extend their rule over western Greece. A few months after the fall of the city Ioannina surrendered to Hamza Bey and Carlo II Tocco accepted Ottoman suzerainty over the southern remnant of the Despotate of Epirus around Arta. Venice moved to place Tocco's island possessions of Zante, Cephalonia, and Leucas under her protection. As a result, for the next half-century, until the end of the First Ottoman–Venetian War in 1479, the main arena of confrontation between Venice and the Ottomans was to be Albania, an area of vital importance to both powers, as from there the Ottomans could threaten Italy herself.

Thessalonica remained in Ottoman hands for 482 years until October 1912, when it was captured by the Kingdom of Greece during the First Balkan War. Its remaining Muslim population left the city during the Greco-Turkish population exchange in 1923.

== Sources ==
- Bakalopulos, A. (1968). "Zur Frage der zweiten Einnahme Thessalonikis durch die Türken, 1391–1394" [On the Question of the Second Capture of Thessaloniki by the Turks, 1391–1394]. Byzantinische Zeitschrift (in German). 61 (2): 285–290. doi:10.1515/bz-1968-0209. S2CID 191470685.
- Bryer, Anthony (1998). "Byzantium: The Roman Orthodox World, 1393–1492". In Allmand, Christopher (ed.). The New Cambridge Medieval History, Vol. VII: c. 1415–c. 1500. Cambridge: Cambridge University Press. pp. 771–795. ISBN 978-0-521-38296-0.
- Dennis, G. T. (1964). "The Second Turkish Capture of Thessalonica. 1391, 1394, or 1430?". Byzantinische Zeitschrift. 57: 53–61. doi:10.1515/byzs.1964.57.1.53. S2CID 194038944.
- Faroqhi, Suraiya (1997). "Selānīk". In Bosworth, C. E.; van Donzel, E.; Heinrichs, W. P. & Lecomte, G. (eds.). The Encyclopaedia of Islam, Second Edition. Volume IX: San–Sze. Leiden: E. J. Brill. pp. 123–126. ISBN 978-90-04-10422-8.
- Fine, John V. A. (1994) [1987]. The Late Medieval Balkans: A Critical Survey from the Late Twelfth Century to the Ottoman Conquest. Ann Arbor, Michigan: University of Michigan Press. ISBN 978-0-472-10079-8.
- Heywood, C. J. (1993). "Muṣṭafā Čelebi, Düzme". In Bosworth, C. E.; van Donzel, E.; Heinrichs, W. P. & Pellat, Ch. (eds.). The Encyclopaedia of Islam, Second Edition. Volume VII: Mif–Naz. Leiden: E. J. Brill. pp. 710–712. ISBN 978-90-04-09419-2.
- Inalcik, Halil (1989). "The Ottoman Turks and the Crusades, 1451–1522". In Setton, Kenneth M.; Hazard, Harry W.; Zacour, Norman P. (eds.). A History of the Crusades, Volume VI: The Impact of the Crusades on Europe. Vol. 6. Madison and London: University of Wisconsin Press. pp. 222–275. ISBN 0-299-10740-X.
- Kastritsis, Dimitris (2007). The Sons of Bayezid: Empire Building and Representation in the Ottoman Civil War of 1402–13. Brill. ISBN 978-90-04-15836-8.
- Kotzageorgis, Phokion (2018). "Christians and Muslims in an Ottoman City: the Formation of the Society of Early Ottoman Thessaloniki". Études balkaniques. 54 (3): 423–456. ISSN 0324-1645.
- Madden, Thomas F. (2012). Venice: A New History. New York: Viking. ISBN 978-1-101-60113-6.
- Magoulias, Harry, ed. (1975). Decline and Fall of Byzantium to the Ottoman Turks, by Doukas. An Annotated Translation of "Historia Turco-Byzantina" by Harry J. Magoulias, Wayne State University. Detroit: Wayne State University Press. ISBN 978-0-8143-1540-8.
- Mertzios, Konstantinos (2007) [1949]. Μνημεία Μακεδονικής Ιστορίας [Monuments of Macedonian History] (PDF) (in Greek) (Second ed.). Thessaloniki: Society for Macedonian Studies. ISBN 978-960-7265-78-4.
- Necipoğlu, Nevra (2009). Byzantium between the Ottomans and the Latins: Politics and Society in the Late Empire. Cambridge: Cambridge University Press. ISBN 978-1-107-40388-8.
- Nicol, Donald M. (1988). Byzantium and Venice: A Study in Diplomatic and Cultural Relations. Cambridge: Cambridge University Press. ISBN 0-521-34157-4.
- Reinert, Stephen W. (2002). "Fragmentation (1204–1453)". In Mango, Cyril (ed.). The Oxford History of Byzantium. Oxford and New York: Oxford University Press. pp. 248–283. ISBN 978-0-19-814098-6.
- Setton, Kenneth M. (1978). The Papacy and the Levant (1204–1571), Volume II: The Fifteenth Century. Vol. 2. Philadelphia: The American Philosophical Society. ISBN 0-87169-127-2.
- Stahl, Alan M. (2009). "Michael of Rhodes: Mariner in Service to Venice". In Long, Pamela O. (ed.). The Book of Michael of Rhodes: A Fifteenth-Century Maritime Manuscript. Volume III: Studies. Cambridge, Massachusetts: MIT Press. pp. 35–98. ISBN 978-0-262-12308-2.
- Vacalopoulos, Apostolos E. (1973). History of Macedonia 1354–1833. Translated by Peter Megann. Thessaloniki: Institute for Balkan Studies. OCLC 220583971.
