= Andronikos Palaiologos (son of Manuel II) =

Byzantine prince and the last governor of Thessalonica from 1408 to 1423

- Despotēs
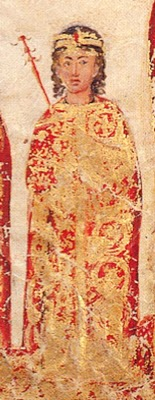
- Manuscript portrait of Andronikos, c. 1404.

Despot in Thessaloniki
- Reign: 1408 – 1423
- Predecessor: John VII Palaiologos (as emperor)
- Emperors: Manuel II Palaiologos; John VIII Palaiologos
- Regent: Demetrios Laskaris Leontares (until 1415/6)
- Born: 1400; Morea
- Died: 4 March 1429 (aged 28–29); Constantinople
- Father: Manuel II Palaiologos
- Mother: Helena Dragaš

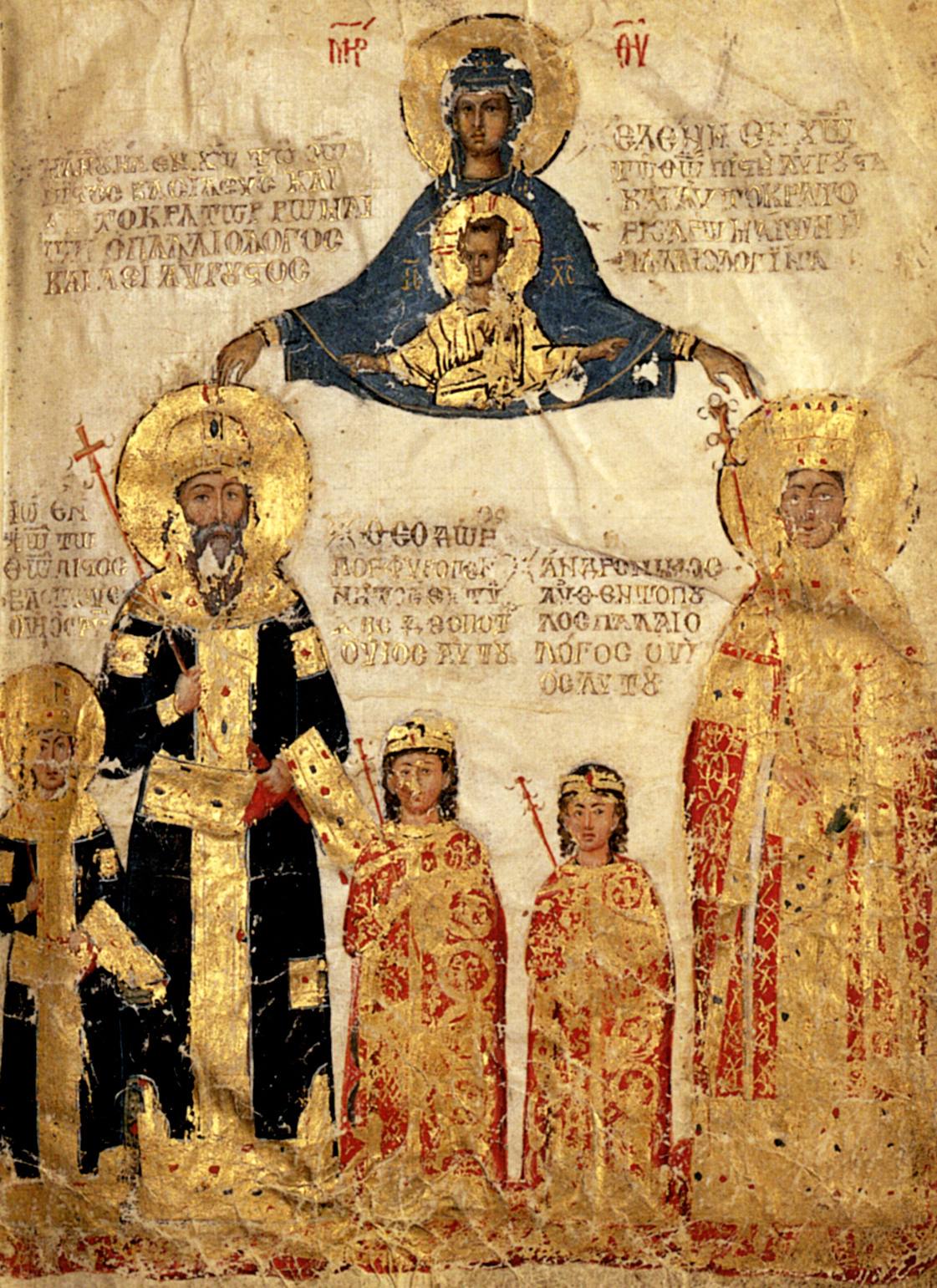
Andronikos (second from right) as a youth with his parents and brothers

Andronikos Palaiologos or Andronicus Palaeologus (Greek: Ἀνδρόνικος Παλαιολόγος) was a Byzantine prince and the last Byzantine governor of Thessalonica with the title of despot (despotēs), from 1408 to 1423.

Andronikos Palaiologos was a son of the Byzantine Emperor Manuel II Palaiologos and his wife Helena Dragaš. His maternal grandfather was the Serb prince Constantine Dragaš. His brothers included emperors John VIII Palaiologos and Constantine XI Palaiologos, as well as Theodore II Palaiologos, Demetrios Palaiologos and Thomas Palaiologos, who ruled as despots in Morea.

In childhood Andronikos survived the sickness which killed his older brother Constantine and two sisters. He never recovered in full, remaining in poor health for the rest of his life, eventually developing an unknown yet severe illness, possibly leprosy or gout. When he was only eight years old his father made him a despot (despotēs) and appointed him imperial representative in Thessalonica, where he succeeded his deceased cousin John VII Palaiologos. As he was still a minor, for the first years of his rule there, until c. 1415/1416, he was under the tutorship of the general Demetrios Laskaris Leontares.

After John VIII assumed control of the imperial government in 1421, the Byzantine Empire faced an increasingly hostile Ottoman Empire. Constantinople was attacked by the Ottomans in 1422, and Thessalonica was subject to a long blockade in 1422–1423. Under siege, and increasingly unwell, Andronikos began diplomatic initiatives for the surrender of the city to the Republic of Venice. These negotiations resulted (although he did not have the support of the whole of the population, and was opposed by the church, which mistrusted the Latins), in a Venetian force entering the city in 1423. The handing over of Thessalonica to Venice contributed to the outbreak of the first in a series of wars between Venice and the Ottoman Empire. The Ottomans conquered Thessalonica in 1430.

His fate after the surrender of Thessalonica is obscure, with conflicting accounts in the sources. The contemporary Venetian Morosini Codex mentions a conspiracy led by Andronikos to surrender Thessalonica to the Turks. The plot was discovered in November 1423, and Andronikos and his supporters were exiled, with the Despot sent to Nauplia in the Morea, and his supporters to Siteia in Crete, Andros, and other places. According to the Greek scholar Apostolos Vakalopoulos, this conspiracy may be identical to the imprisonment of four leading aristocrats, led by a certain Platyskalites, for their association with the Ottomans, as reported by the Byzantine historian Doukas. The four men were exiled, first to Crete, and then to Venice itself and Padua. The Byzantine sources do not mention Andronikos' involvement in a conspiracy, and record different fates for him: Laonikos Chalkokondyles records that he went to Mantineia in the Morea, where he died; Theodore Spandounes writes that he sailed for Venice but died during the journey; Sphrantzes claims that he became a monk in the Pantokrator Monastery in Constantinople, where he died in 1429 and was buried next to his father; a number of other sources, including Pseudo-Sphrantzes, claim that he became a monk in Mount Athos, specifically the Vatopedi Monastery, where he died.

== Sources ==
- Mertzios, Konstantinos (2007) [1949]. Μνημεία Μακεδονικής Ιστορίας [Monuments of Macedonian History] (PDF) (in Greek) (Second ed.). Thessaloniki: Society for Macedonian Studies. ISBN 978-960-7265-78-4.
- Necipoğlu, Nevra (2009). Byzantium between the Ottomans and the Latins: Politics and Society in the Late Empire. Cambridge: Cambridge University Press. ISBN 978-1-107-40388-8.
- Setton, Kenneth M. (1978). The Papacy and the Levant (1204–1571), Volume II: The Fifteenth Century. Vol. 2. Philadelphia: The American Philosophical Society. ISBN 0-87169-127-2.
- Vacalopoulos, Apostolos E. (1973). History of Macedonia 1354–1833. Translated by Peter Megann. Thessaloniki: Institute for Balkan Studies. Archived from the original on 23 April 2016.
- Gilliland Wright, Diana (22 June 2010). "Surprised by Time". blogger.com.

Andronikos Palaiologos (son of Manuel II) Palaiologos dynasty
Regnal titles
Preceded by John VII Palaiologos as Emperor in Thessaloniki	Despot of Thessalonica; 1408–1423	Succeeded by none
