= Symeon of Thessalonica =

15th-century Byzantine monk and theologian

Saint Symeon of Thessalonica
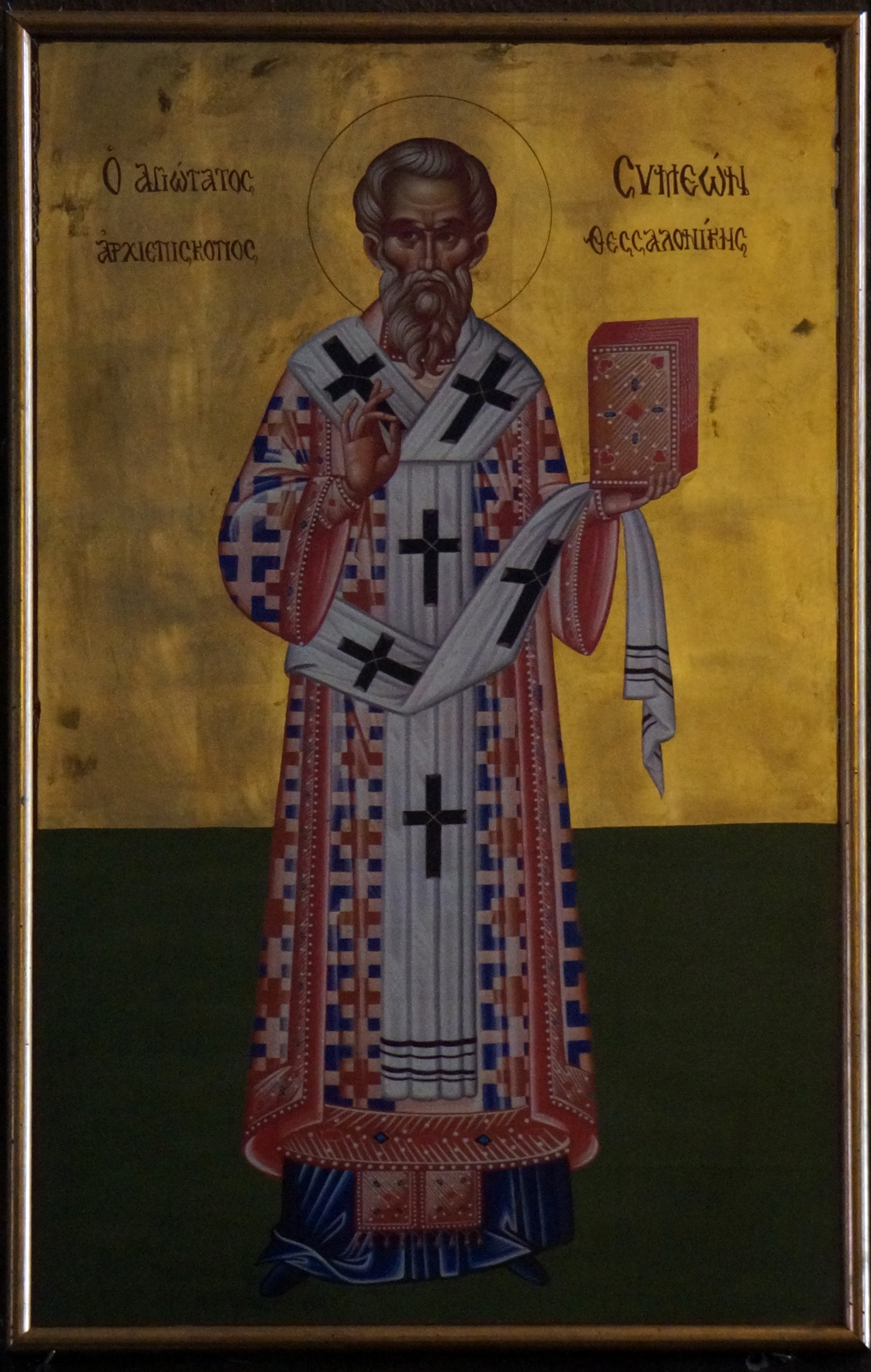
- Icon of Symeon of Thessalonica
- Born: c. 1381; Constantinople, Byzantine Empire
- Died: c. September 1429; Thessalonica, Venetian Republic
- Honored in: Eastern Orthodox Church
- Canonized: 14 April 1981
- Feast: 15 September

Saint Symeon of Thessalonica (c. 1381–1429) was a monk, bishop and theologian in Greece. He is venerated in the Eastern Orthodox Church, and was canonized in 1981. He served as the archbishop of Thessalonica, for some time before his death.

== Biography ==
Symeon was born in Constantinople, most likely between 1381 and 1387. He became a monk in one of the monasteries there, possibly the Xanthopouloi monastery.

He was archbishop of Thessalonica from 1416 or 1417, until his death in 1429. His consecration took place in Constantinople, in accordance with the established practice for hierarchs who belonged to the Patriarchate of Constantinople.

The city of Thessalonica was surrounded by Ottoman forces when he arrived as archbishop in 1416–17. He slipped quietly out of the city in June 1422 to go to Constantinople and persuade the emperor to send more forces to protect the city. He got only as far at Mount Athos, narrowly escaping capture by the Ottoman forces beginning their siege. On Mt. Athos he was convinced to return to Thessalonica. From this point onward, he presided over the city at a particularly difficult time with the city under siege by the Ottoman sultan Murad II (1421–1451). Receiving no help from the emperor in Constantinople, the city's governor, Andronikos Palaiologos, took the decision to hand Thessalonica over to Venice, in the hope that the maritime republic would keep it out of Ottoman hands.

Venetian rule, however, could not prevent the Ottomans from maintaining their siege, and conditions in the city remained desperate. Symeon describes these events in his Logos Historikos. His death, probably in September 1429, came shortly before Thessalonica finally fell to the Ottomans in March 1430.

== Works ==
Symeon wrote a number theological and liturgical works, which were imperfectly edited in Iaşi in 1683, reprinted by Migne in PG 155. He also left a number of short works, homilies, and a host of pastoral letters to be found in the Political-historical Works and in the Theological Works (Ἔργα θεολογικά) published by Balfour. In addition, he wrote numerous hymns and a discourse on the priesthood. The most extensive of his works is the Dialogue in Christ, which runs from PG 155: 33 to 696. It begins with a lengthy anti-heretical section and then deals with each the church's religious services.

Some of his works on the Jesus Prayer are also included in the Philokalia.

== Veneration ==
He was canonized by the Greek Orthodox Church on the 14th of April 1981. His feast day is celebrated on 15 September.

== Secondary literature ==
- Russell, Eugenia (2009). "Symeon of Thessalonica and his message of personal redemption". In Russell, Eugenia (ed.). Spirituality in Late Byzantium. Newcastle upon Tyne. pp. 33–43.
- Balfour, David (1982). "St Symeon of Thessalonica: A Polemical Hesychast". Sobornost. 4 (1): 36–41.
