= Junayd of Aydın =

Bey of Aydin from 1405 to 1425

Junayd
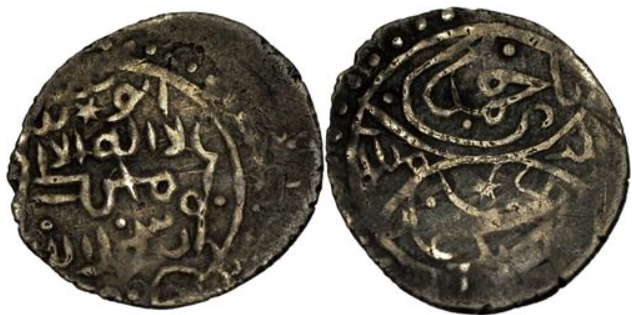
- Undated coin struck by Junayd during his second reign.

Ruler of Smyrna and the Beylik of Aydın
- Reign: 1405–1425 (with interruptions)
- Predecessor: Umur of Aydın
- Successor: Ottoman conquest

Juneyd or Junayd Bey (Turkish: İzmiroğlu Cüneyd Bey; (Note: Junayd (جنيد), variously transcribed as Juneyd, Juneid, etc., is an Arabic name meaning "young warrior". In the modern Turkish alphabet, it is written as Cüneyd or Cüneyt. In medieval Ottoman sources, he is also known by the patronymic surname İzmiroğlu, "son of [the ruler of] İzmir".) fl. 1402 – 1425) was the last ruler (bey) of the Aydınid principality in what is now central western Turkey. His exact relationship with the Aydınid dynasty is unclear. His father was a long-time and popular governor of Smyrna under the Ottoman sultan Bayezid I. This allowed Junayd to consistently rely on the loyalty of the area's populace.

Bayezid was defeated by Timur at the Battle of Ankara, beginning a civil war for succession between his sons – a period known as the "Ottoman Interregnum". Taking advantage of the situation, Junayd attacked the Aydınid brothers, Isa and Umur II, who had been restored by Timur. By early 1406, Isa and Umur were dead and Junayd was the undisputed ruler of the former Aydınid domains. Like all the rulers of the region, Muslim and Christian alike, Junayd was also an active participant in the civil war between Bayezid's sons İsa, Süleyman, Musa and Mehmed, in which he changed his allegiance several times. He supported İsa against Mehmed, and became a vassal of Süleyman. His persistent attempts to exploit the conflict to broaden his power and independence forced Süleyman to send him as provincial governor of Ohrid in Rumeli in 1410. After Süleyman's overthrow and death in 1411 at the hands of his brother Musa, Junayd returned to Anatolia and seized Smyrna, but had to recognize the suzerainty of Mehmed. During Mehmed's absence in Rumeli to campaign against Musa, Junayd reclaimed his independence and attacked his neighbouring rulers. As a result, in 1414 Mehmed led a regional coalition against Junayd. Junayd's mother was able to save his life, but once again Junayd was dispossessed and sent to Rumeli as governor of Nicopolis. From there, he joined the unsuccessful rebellion of Mustafa Çelebi, until the Byzantines agreed to intern him and Mustafa in 1416.

In 1421 Mehmed died and his son Murad II refused to honour his father's obligations to the Byzantines. In consequence, Mustafa and Junayd were released. Mustafa gained the allegiance of the Ottoman marcher-lords of Rumeli, and overcame an army sent against them under the vizier Bayezid Pasha, whom Junayd executed. When Mustafa marched to confront Murad in Anatolia, Junayd was persuaded to desert him. Mustafa withdrew to Rumeli, where he was captured and executed. In the meantime, Junayd restored his rule over his former principality until 1424, when Murad finally turned against him. Driven from Smyrna, Junayd sought refuge in the fortress of İpsili. In early 1425, Ottoman ships completed the siege of İpsili by sea and he was forced to surrender. Despite assurances of safety, he and his family were executed, ending the Aydınid line.

== Background ==
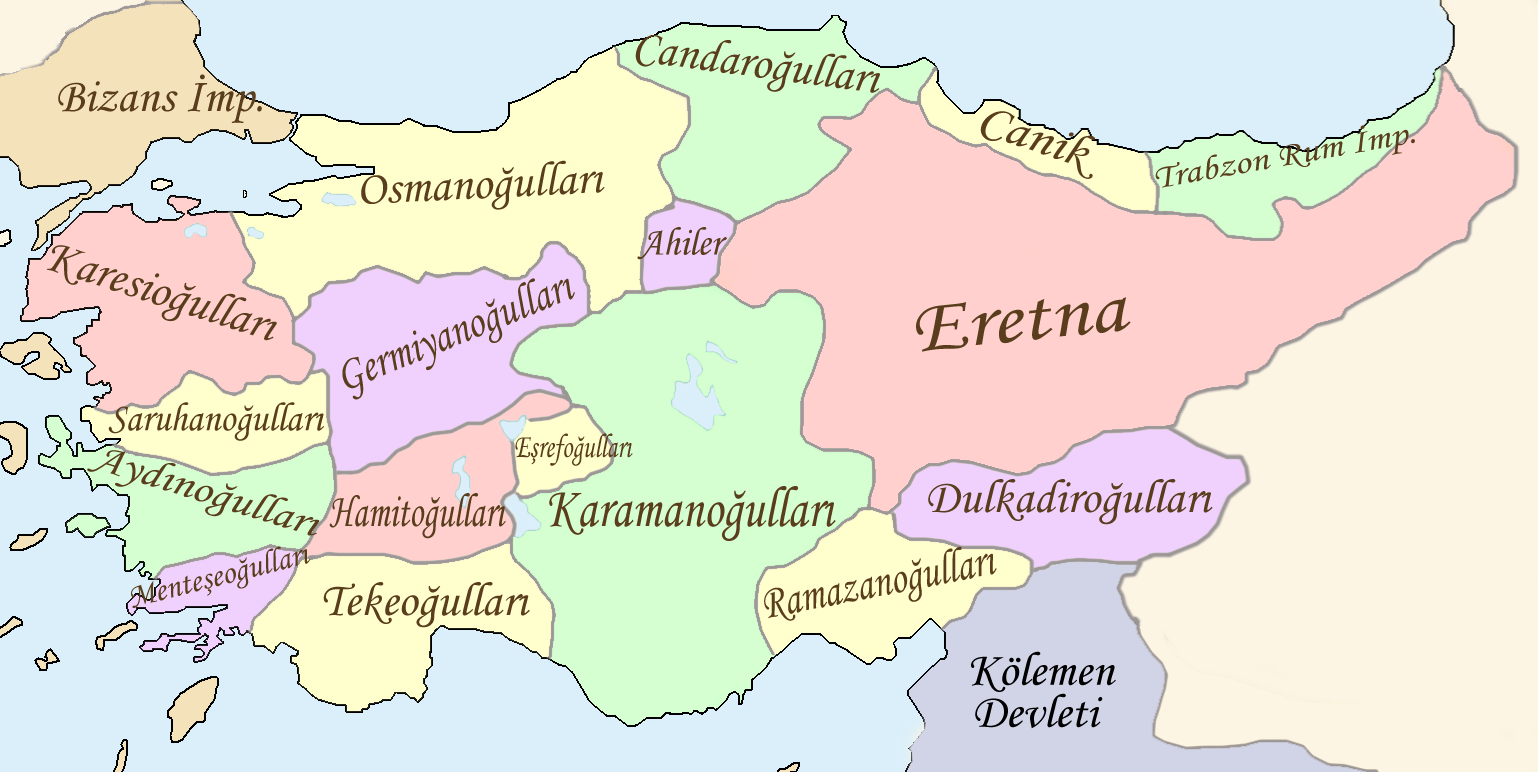
The independent Turkish beyliks in Anatolia, c. mid-14th century. The Ottoman beylik (Osmanoğulları) is shown in the northeast, and the Aydınids (Aydınoğulları) in the west

The Beylik of Aydın was a small Turkmen principality (emirate or beylik) in western Anatolia that emerged after the disintegration of the Seljuq Sultanate of Rum. Little is known of its eponymous founder, Aydınoğlu Mehmed Bey, who was previously in the service of the Germiyanids. The beylik was extended by Mehmed Bey (r. 1308–1334) into the former Byzantine lands along the Küçükmenderes River (Note: Byzantine Kaystros) up to the Aegean coast. Its two main ports were Ayasoluk, (Note: Byzantine Agios Theologos; modern Selçuk) near the ruins of ancient Ephesus, and Smyrna, (Note: Modern İzmir) while its capital was Birgi. (Note: Byzantine Pyrgion) It reached its greatest power under Mehmed's son, Umur (r. 1334–1348), who established it as an important naval power. Umur became involved in the Byzantine civil war of 1341–1347 and launched successful raids against the Christian states of the Aegean Sea. This led to the two Smyrniote crusades and the loss of the lower town and port of Smyrna to the Latins. Umur was killed fighting at Smyrna in 1348. Under his successors, the beylik declined and was annexed by the Ottoman sultan, Bayezid I (r. 1389–1402), in 1390.

Junayd's origin is not entirely clear. Sources about the period are many and have diverse provenance, differing greatly in scope, detail, and reliability. The main contemporaneous source about Junayd's career is the chronicle of the Byzantine historian, Doukas. Doukas calls him "Juneid, the son of Kara-subashi" (subashi being a gubernatorial title rather than a proper name) and reports that the latter was "a brave man, illustrious in warfare", who had served for many years as governor of Smyrna under Bayezid I and therefore gained the respect and loyalty of the Smyrnaeans. In Turkish sources, the name of Junayd's father is given as Ibrahim or sometimes, Ibrahim Fatih ("Ibrahim the Conqueror"). The Turkish historian Himmet Akın suggests that Junayd's father was the same individual as Ibrahim Bahadur, a son of Mehmed Bey and lord of Bodemya. (Note: Byzantine Potamia; modern Bademli) This view is also accepted by Irène Mélikoff, in the Encyclopaedia of Islam article on Junayd. The Greek Ottomanist Elisabeth Zachariadou challenges this identification, since no source records a relationship between Ibrahim Fatih and Bodemya, whereas he is strongly identified with the region of Smyrna, where he established a number of pious foundations (vakf). Furthermore, based on a reference in the satirical work of the contemporary Byzantine author, Mazaris, Zachariadou suggests that Ibrahim may have been a Byzantine renegade.

Junayd's relationship to the Aydınid family is thus unclear, although he may have been a member of a lesser branch of the dynasty. A number of Genoese documents, first published in 1999, shed some further light on his family. Of these, a document dated to 1394 mentions the subassi Smirarum (subashi of the Smyrnaeans) – evidently Junayd's father. It concerns discussions on the release of two of the sons of the subassi, who had been taken prisoner by the Latin captain of Smyrna. Kastritsis reports Junayd may have been one of them. It is known that Junayd had an uncle, Qurt Hasan, and three brothers: Hasan Agha, Bayezid, and Hamza.

== Start of the Ottoman Interregnum (1403–1405) ==
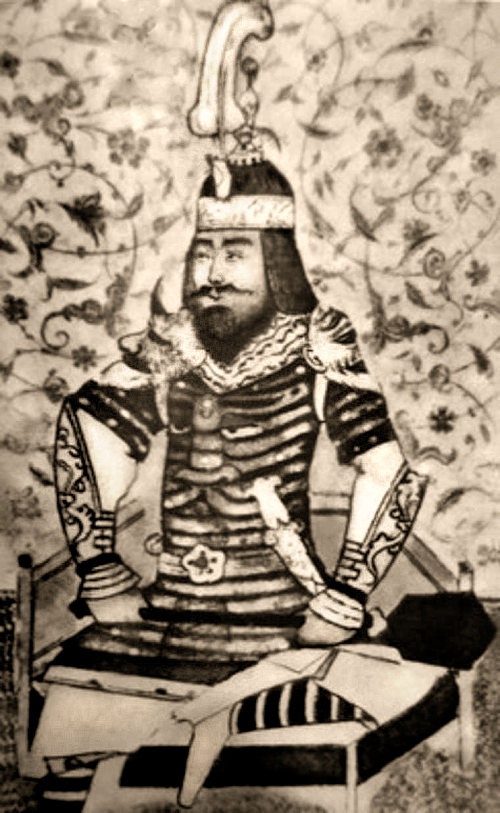
Timur, 15th-century miniature

At the Battle of Ankara in August 1402, Bayezid I was defeated and captured by the Turco-Mongol conqueror Timur. Timur spent the subsequent winter in the former Aydınid lands, engaging in the recapture of the lower town of Smyrna from the Knights Hospitaller. He initially appointed a certain Mehmed to govern Ayasoluk – according to Kastritsis and Zachariadou, probably one of Timur's Turco-Mongol magnates – and himself established his court there during his stay in the region. In March 1403, Timur withdrew from Anatolia, with plans to campaign against China. He left control over the Aydınid domains to Isa and Umur II, grandsons of Mehmed Bey. Junayd appears to have exploited the volatile political situation created by Timur's withdrawal to gain control of Smyrna (which, after Timur's campaign, was now entirely in Muslim hands). The process by which this happened is unknown. In the account of Doukas, for example, he is immediately introduced leading an army from Smyrna to eject the Aydınids from Ayasoluk, an event which modern historians date to 1405 (see next section for details).

Bayezid's capture, and his death three months later, began the period known as the Ottoman Interregnum: a civil war for succession between his sons that lasted from 1402 until 1413. Neighboring lands, including the Christian states in the region (the Byzantine Empire, Wallachia, and Serbia) became involved in the conflict to preserve their borders against the threat of renewed Ottoman Turkish expansionism. Minor beyliks of the region restored by Timur were obliged to acknowledge the ascendant Ottoman claimant, while the Ottoman princes vied for support in return for recognizing their autonomy. The Anatolian beys tended to recognize as their overlord whichever of the Ottoman princes controlled Bursa – the first Ottoman capital and still formally the Dar al-Saltana ("abode of the sultanate").

Bayezid's second son, Süleyman Çelebi, controlled the Ottoman provinces in the Balkans (Rumeli). In Anatolia, the Ottoman territories were divided between his two brothers, İsa Çelebi and Mehmed I (the latter the eventual victor in the civil war). İsa initially held the advantage, as he controlled the original core of the Ottoman state, Bithynia (including Bursa), while Mehmed ruled the peripheral and recently conquered Rûm Eyalet. Sometime between March and early May 1403, Mehmed had defeated his brother at the Battle of Ulubad and seized Bursa, forcing İsa to seek refuge in the Byzantine capital, Constantinople. With the support of Süleyman, İsa returned to Anatolia by 18 May 1403. He laid siege to and sacked Bursa, but was again defeated by Mehmed near the city. İsa then allied himself with İsfendiyar Bey of Kastamonu, only to be defeated again at Gerede.

İsa traveled to Smyrna, where he formed an alliance with Junayd. Through Junayd, the alliance was extended to include the neighbouring rulers of Sarukhan, Menteshe, Teke and Germiyan. It is unclear if by this time Junayd was a vassal of Süleyman as he became later. Kastritsis concludes that if he was, then Junayd's support of İsa was probably in alignment with Süleyman's policy of supporting İsa against Mehmed. The allies held superior numbers, but Mehmed was able to overcome them in a battle near Smyrna, assisted by his own alliance with the Karamanids and the Beylik of Dulkadir. To maintain his authority, Junayd was forced to submit to the victor and ask for pardon, while İsa, trying to escape, was caught and strangled at Eskişehir.

Worried by Mehmed's increasing power, Süleyman invaded Anatolia himself in late 1403 or early 1404, and occupied Bursa. Unable to face his brother's superior forces, Mehmed withdrew east to Rûm, and the stand-off between the two brothers entered a period of relative stalemate that lasted until 1410.

== Takeover of the Aydınid beylik (1405–1406) ==
Map of the Aydınid beylik and its surrounding region, 14th/15th centuries

In spring 1405, Junayd assembled a force of "more than five hundred troops", including many Smyrnaeans, with which he captured Ayasoluk and evicted the Aydınid brothers, Isa and Umur from their principality. According to Doukas, Junayd claimed to be operating on behalf of Süleyman, who supported Junayd with money. In the struggle that followed, the Aydınids appear to have been backed by Mehmed. A report from the Venetian colony of Crete suggests that, in early summer 1405, Mehmed allied himself with the rulers of Aydın (Umur) and Menteshe, and that Junayd sided with Süleyman in opposing them.

Isa of Aydın was killed by Junayd near Palaiopolis, but Umur escaped. Umar's uncle, Ilyas Bey, ruler of Menteshe, marched against Ayasoluk in support. Doukas puts the force at 6,000 men, against the 3,000 of Junayd and the Kara-subashi. (Note: The identity of the Kara-subashi at this point is unclear: it may have been Junayd's father, but according to a different interpretation, it was Junayd's brother Hasan Agha, who had succeeded to their father's title.) The town was held by the Kara-subashi, while Junayd held Smyrna. Ayasoluk surrendered after a two-day bombardment with incendiary missiles, but the Kara-subashi held the citadel until his surrender in autumn. Doukas reports that Ilyas Bey imprisoned the Kara-subashi and his retainers at Marmaris. Junayd took a light galley and sailed to Marmaris. Having secretly notified them of his approach, the prisoners threw a feast for the guards. When the guards fell into a drunken stupor, the prisoners climbed down the castle walls and escaped to Smyrna in Junayd's ship.

At the beginning of winter, Junayd besieged Umur at Ayasoluk. The siege was lifted when a pact was made in which Junayd offered one of his daughters in marriage with Umur . According to Doukas, Junayd recognized Umur as lord of the Aydınid domains and renounced his allegiance to Süleyman. Together, the two men toured the Aydınid principality as far as Alaşehir, (Note: Byzantine Philadelphia) Salihli, and Nif. (Note: Nymphaion, modern Kemalpaşa) According to Doukas, Junayd "settled in these parts his most faithful followers, and entrusted the entire province to his relatives and friends". Having thus extended his control over the Aydınid domains, when they returned to Ayasoluk, Junayd killed Umur (winter 1405 or spring 1406) and assumed rule of the principality. According to Kastritsis, modern scholars have seen in Junayd's revolt a reassertion of the "former Ottoman status quo" against the Timurid appointees. It is evident that Junayd could rely on extensive local support, established in the days of his father's governorship in the region.

== Between Süleyman and Mehmed (1406–1413) ==
Map of the southern Balkans and western Anatolia in 1410. Ottoman and Turkish territories are marked in shades of brown, Byzantine territory in pink, Venetian and Venetian-influenced areas in green, and other Latin principalities in blue

Having declared himself independent from Süleyman, Junayd began preparing for the reaction of the Ottoman prince, by going in person to Konya and Kütahya to forge a common front with the beys of Karaman and Germiyan. According to Doukas, the bey of Karaman came to his aid with 3,000 men, and the bey of Germiyan with 10,000. They joined Junayd's 5,000 at Ayasoluk. In the meantime, Süleyman, at the head of 25,000 troops, had advanced to Smyrna via Bursa and Pergamon. Learning of the arrival of the other beys in support of Junayd, he moved his troops to the vicinity of Ayasoluk and erected a fortified camp. Both sides hesitated to attack each other, but Junayd's spies informed him that the other rulers planned to seize him and deliver him to Süleyman so they could negotiate favourable terms. Junayd immediately instructed his brother, who held the citadel of Ayasoluk, to be watchful, and rode with his household troops to Süleyman. Doukas relates that Junayd put a noose around his neck and presented himself to the Ottoman ruler as a repentant sinner. Süleyman was moved by the sight and pardoned him, but when Junayd proposed to lead the army against the beys of Karaman and Germiyan, Süleyman refused, and only after dawn did he begin his march in the direction of Ayasoluk. The two beys, after finding Junayd gone in the middle of the night, gathered their forces and withdrew in haste to the east.

Reports from the Republic of Ragusa, dating from June 1407, indicate that Süleyman had defeated Mehmed in battle and that the latter had fled to a mountain near Smyrna. Venetian reports from September of the same year record that Süleyman was preparing his fleet to sail from Gallipoli against Ayasoluk, Palatia, and Smyrna. This indicates that both Junayd and the ruler of Menteshe (who had his capital at Palatia) were, by this time, allies and presumably both vassals of Mehmed.

In June 1410, Süleyman was forced to return to Rumeli due to the actions of a fourth brother, Musa Çelebi. The latter had found refuge in Wallachia, and in 1409 he crossed the Danube into Süleyman's domains, quickly gaining many followers. According to Doukas, Süleyman took Junayd with him and appointed him governor of Ohrid, while appointing a new governor over Junayd's domain. However, as late as July 1410, the Venetian Senate regarded Aydın and Menteshe as independent beyliks – indicating they were not under the control of Süleyman. The Senate instructed the Venetian captains to conclude treaties with the beyliks or, failing that, attack their territory. Süleyman's treatment of Junayd can be explained by a recently discovered coin, minted by Junayd in AH 812 (16 May 1409 – 5 May 1410). It mentions Mehmed as his overlord. This implies that Süleyman's authority over the Anatolian beyliks was weakening at the time, and that Süleyman secured Junayd's loyalty by taking him with him. Conversely, Junayd's appointment in Ohrid was probably a calculated move. The historian Dimitris Kastritsis describes it as an attempt to "establish control over the central part of Rumeli by placing it in the hands of someone of proven ambition, who was also totally dependent on him [Süleyman], with no ties to Rumeli’s political circles". It also served to keep Junayd as far from Anatolia as possible.

Süleyman was initially successful against Musa, but on 17 February 1411, Musa launched a surprise attack on Edirne and killed his brother. Taking advantage of the resulting confusion, Junayd left his post and returned to Smyrna, where he regained much of his former domains and decapitated the governor appointed by Süleyman. The anonymous Ottoman chronicle, Aḥvāl-i Sulṭān Meḥemmed ("Affairs of Sultan Mehmed"), records that after his defeat by Musa at the Battle of İnceğiz (winter 1411/1412), Mehmed was forced to march against Junayd. Junayd had captured the province of Aydın, and was laying siege to Ayasoluk, whose governor was evidently loyal to Mehmed. The chronicler writes that Mehmed recovered the province and that Junayd was besieged in the "citadel of Smyrna". This reference is problematic, since the citadel of Smyrna had been razed by Timur. According to Kastritsis, this may have been a mistaken reference to Ayasoluk, unless the citadel of Smyrna had been rebuilt in the meantime. Whatever the exact course of events, in the end, Junayd surrendered to Mehmed. Mehmed allowed him to keep his territories but required that the minting of coins and the Friday prayer, the khutbah – the traditional attributes of sovereignty in the Islamic world – be henceforth carried out in his name.

== During the reign of Mehmed (1413–1421) ==
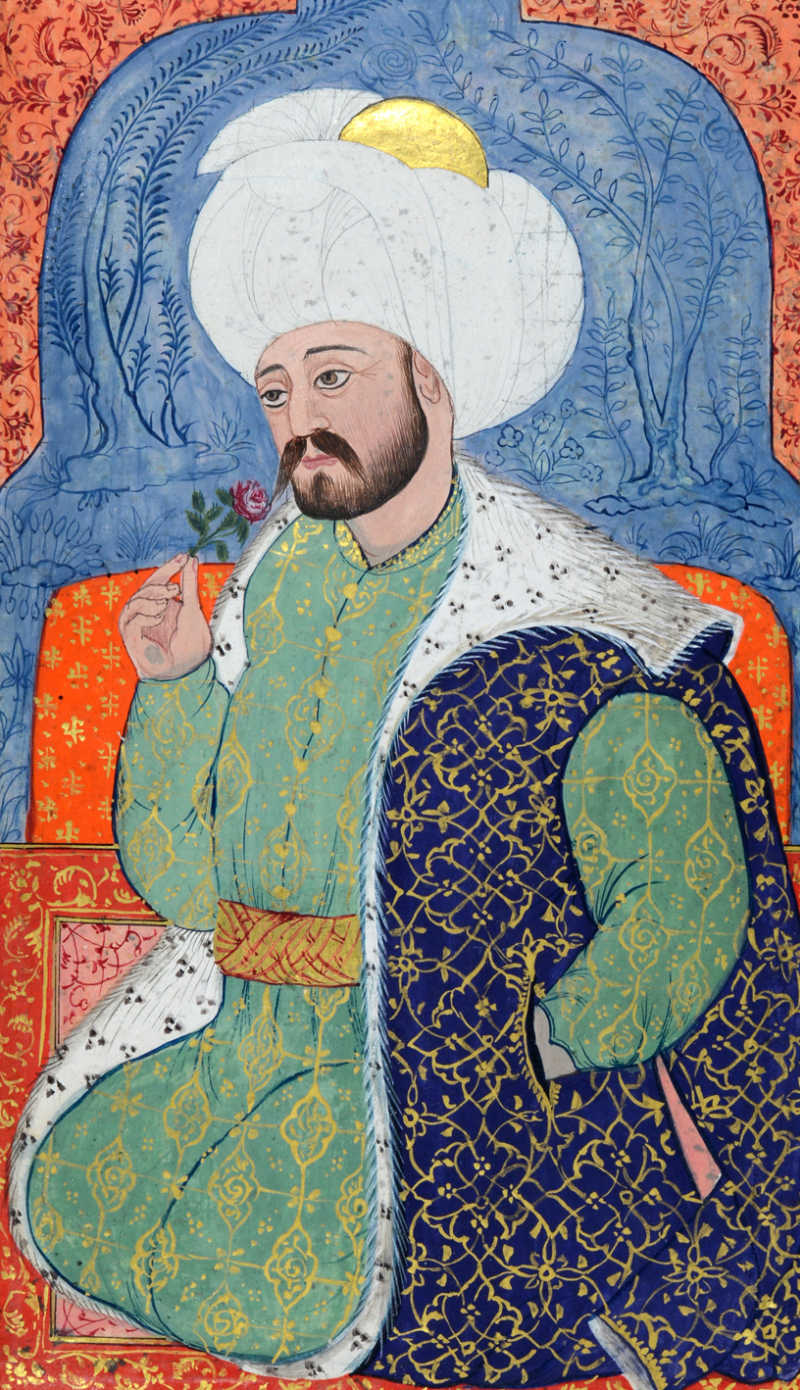
Mehmed I, 16th-century Ottoman miniature

In July 1413, Mehmed defeated Musa at the Battle of Çamurlu and consolidated his control over Rumeli. He then returned to Anatolia. In Mehmed's absence, the bey of Karaman had sacked Bursa. Junayd too, had taken advantage of his absence to expand against his neighbours. According to Doukas, Mehmed sent messages to Junayd ordering him to hand back the lands he had seized. He proposed that Junayd keep his original domain in exchange for a marriage between his daughter and Mehmed. When Junayd received the message, in his "arrogance and overweening pride", he married his daughter to a slave, an Albanian convert called Abdallah, and ordered Mehmed's emissary to bear back to his master the insulting message that "we have taken for a son-in-law an Albanian like himself [i.e. Mehmed], a redeemed slave like himself, having a master as powerful as himself, younger than himself, and wiser than himself."

After restoring Bursa, Mehmed turned south to deal with Junayd. Junayd strengthened his fortresses, and awaited the Ottoman Sultan's arrival at Ayasoluk. His mother, his children, and his brother Bayezid were left in his capital Smyrna, which he fortified and provisioned against a long siege. During his march south, Mehmed took the fortress of Kymai, (Note: Modern Aliağa) Kayacık (Note: The Byzantine fortress of the Archangel) and Nif by assault. In the last, he found the slave Abdallah and had him castrated as revenge for the insult to his person. When Mehmed arrived before Smyrna, he was met by a large number of local rulers – according to Doukas, "the governors of Old and New Phocaea, Germiyan and upper Phrygia, Menteshe of Caria, the lords of Mytilene and Chios in their triremes, and the grand master of Rhodes". They submitted to him and offered their help against Junayd. Doukas states they did this for two reasons: "Mehmed's goodness and gentle nature and superior military strength" on the one hand, and because of Junayd's "cunningness and rapacity, on the other". After a siege of ten days from land and sea, Junayd's mother, wife and children presented themselves and made their obeisance, surrendering the city.

His mother continued to plead on Junayd's behalf until Mehmed pardoned him, at which point Junayd presented himself before the Sultan and made his obeisance. According to Doukas, Mehmed sent Junayd to Rumeli again, as governor of the frontier province of Nicopolis in Bulgaria, while handing over the province of Aydın to the Bulgarian prince Alexander.

Not long afterwards, Mustafa Çelebi, another son of Bayezid, (Note: In Ottoman sources, Mustafa is called Düzme, "pretender", and is considered an impostor; modern scholars however generally follow Doukas and consider Mustafa to have been truly the eldest son of Bayezid, who had been taken into captivity by Timur after the Battle of Ankara.) who had been taken captive at Ankara but had been released by Timur before his death, reappeared and went to Wallachia. Given the proximity of Nicopolis to Wallachia, and not trusting Junayd's loyalty, Mehmed sent two trusted servants to kill him, but Junayd crossed the Danube and joined Mustafa in Wallachia two days before their arrival. Mustafa appointed Junayd as his vizier. With soldiers provided by the Wallachian ruler Mircea I (r. 1386–1418– ), Mustafa and Junayd entered Thrace and tried to raise the local Ottoman forces in revolt. Failing in this, they found refuge in Constantinople. In spring 1416, they went to the Byzantine city of Thessalonica, and tried to raise support from the Ottoman marcher-lords (uç beğleri) of Macedonia. Although they captured Serres, they still failed to win many supporters. Mehmed defeated them in battle in autumn. Mustafa and Junayd fled back to Thessalonica, where the local governor, Demetrios Laskaris Leontares, took them under his protection. Mehmed besieged the city, until the Emperor Manuel II Palaiologos (r. 1391–1425– ) agreed to keep them as hostages for as long as Mehmed lived, in exchange for a yearly payment of 300,000 akçes. According to Doukas, Mustafa was sent to the island of Lemnos, while Junayd was cloistered in the monastery of Pammakaristos Church in Constantinople. (Note: Laonikos Chalkokondyles on the other hand states that Mustafa and Junayd were brought first to Monemvasia, and then to Lemnos and Imbros respectively, while the Ottoman historian Enveri claims that they were held in the Venetian colony of Negroponte (Aghriboz in Turkish).)

== Second revolt of Mustafa (1421–1422) ==
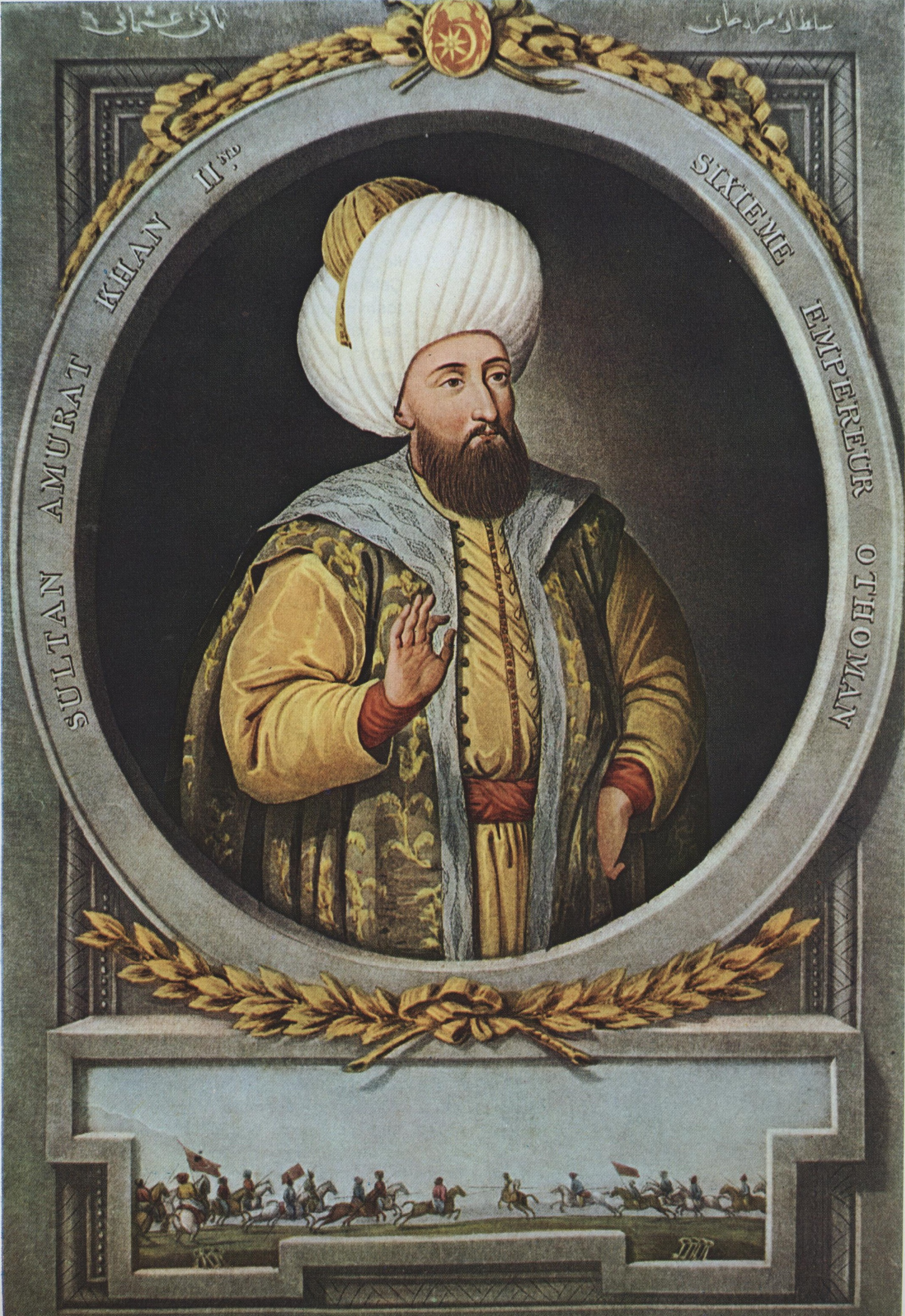
Idealized portrait of Murad II by Konstantin Kapıdağlı

In 1421, Mehmed died, and was succeeded by his 17-year-old son, Murad II. In his testament, Mehmed consigned his two youngest sons, Yusuf and Mahmud, to the Byzantine Emperor as hostages, but Mehmed's vizier, Bayezid Pasha, refused to hand them over. As a result, the Byzantines released both Mustafa and Junayd from captivity, seeing in this a chance to establish not only a friendly Ottoman regime, but also to regain lost territories in northern Greece, the Black Sea coast, and Gallipoli. After Mustafa swore solemn oaths to obey the Emperor and hand over the desired lands, a Byzantine fleet under Demetrios Leontares brought them to Gallipoli on 15 August 1421. Mustafa's and Leontares' troops disembarked before the city, where the garrison and the local militia had gathered to oppose them. Murad's men "were unable to resist Juneid because the man was courageous and more experienced in warfare than any Turk of his time", according to Doukas, and were defeated and forced to flee back to the city. Mustafa then addressed the garrison and persuaded many of them to surrender; and on the next morning, he entered the city of Gallipoli. From there, he began his march on Edirne, while Leontares laid siege to the citadel of Gallipoli, which continued to resist.

Unlike his previous attempt, Mustafa was soon joined by many of the marcher-lords that dominated Rumeli, including Turahan Bey, the sons of Evrenos, and the Gümlüoğlu family. He quickly extended his control over much of Macedonia, including the cities of Yenidje and Serres, and began striking his first coins there. Murad sent Bayezid Pasha with an army from Anatolia to confront Mustafa. The two armies met at Sazlıdere, near Edirne, but the troops of Bayezid defected en masse to Mustafa after he showed them the scars he had received at the Battle of Ankara. Bayezid surrendered and was executed – according to Doukas, on the insistence of Junayd. His brother, Hamza Bey, was spared because Junayd "had pity on him because of his youth", according to Doukas. Mustafa entered Edirne in triumph. When the defenders of the citadel of Gallipoli learned of this, they surrendered as well, and departed the fortress. According to Doukas, as Leontares was preparing to take possession of Gallipoli, Junayd and Mustafa arrived. They informed him that their agreement was void, as they could not countenance the surrender of their own people to the infidels. Although he protested vehemently, Leontares had no choice but to gather his men and depart for Constantinople, while Mustafa organized his fleet and strengthened the defences of the harbour.

As a result of this breach of faith, Emperor Manuel sent envoys to Murad. In exchange for ferrying Murad's army across to Europe, Manuel demanded that he surrender Gallipoli and hand over his two younger brothers as hostages – similar to what Mehmed and Süleyman had agreed to. Negotiations stalled, with Murad unwilling to accept the terms, but the Genoese podesta (governor) of New Phocaea, Giovanni Adorno, offered to ferry Murad's army. Mustafa, worried at this news, was persuaded by Junayd to cross into Anatolia first. According to Doukas, Junayd's motives were purely personal. Mustafa had become dissolute, and he feared that he would fall against his brother. Should that happen while Junayd was in Europe, he risked being captured by the Byzantines; a prospect that, following his treachery at Gallipoli, was not very appealing. Junayd therefore sought to return to Anatolia and his own principality as soon as possible.

The following year, Junayd accompanied Mustafa to Anatolia. Their army numbered so many men, according to Doukas, that it took three days for the force to cross at Lampsakos. Murad moved with his troops from Bursa to confront them at Lopadion (Ulubad), where his men tore down the bridge over the Nilüfer River, blocking Mustafa's advance. Doukas provides a detailed report that Murad's advisors used Junayd's brother, Hamza, who was a lifelong close friend of Murad, to meet Junayd during the night and convince him to desert with promises of restoring him to his former domains. Shortly after nightfall, Junayd secretly assembled his closest friends and household members with seventy swift horses. Taking only a cloak and as much gold, silver, or other precious items they could carry, they abandoned Mustafa's camp, riding hard for Smyrna. According to Doukas, "in one night they covered the distance of a two days' journey". Junayd's party arrived before the town on the next evening and were welcomed by the inhabitants. Junayd's defection was only one of "a series of stratagems and ruses" employed by Murad and described by the eyewitness historian, Ashik Pasha-Zade. Mustafa was deserted by the Rumelian beys and was forced to withdraw to Gallipoli and Edirne. Murad pursued, crossing the Dardanelles on 15 January 1422 in ships provided by Adorno. Mustafa tried to escape to Wallachia but was recognized, seized and hanged at Edirne.

Following Junayd's return to Smyrna, Mustafa, an Aydınid who had been active in the area of Ayasoluk, gathered his forces and marched against him. Junayd hastily began to assemble his own army. He was crucially aided, according to Doukas, by the mountain-dwellers of the area, who were "very bellicose and martial and friends of Juneid's father". Within a week he had gathered a force of over two thousand, which he equipped with bows, axes, javelins, and crude lances. The two armies confronted each other in a marshy and wooded place called Mesavlion. When battle was joined, Junayd launched a headlong attack on Mustafa and killed him with an iron mace. Thereupon, Mustafa's soldiers acknowledged him as their ruler. With Mustafa's death, Junayd's rule was uncontested, and he quickly reconquered his former beylik.

== End of the Aydınid principality (1424–1425) ==
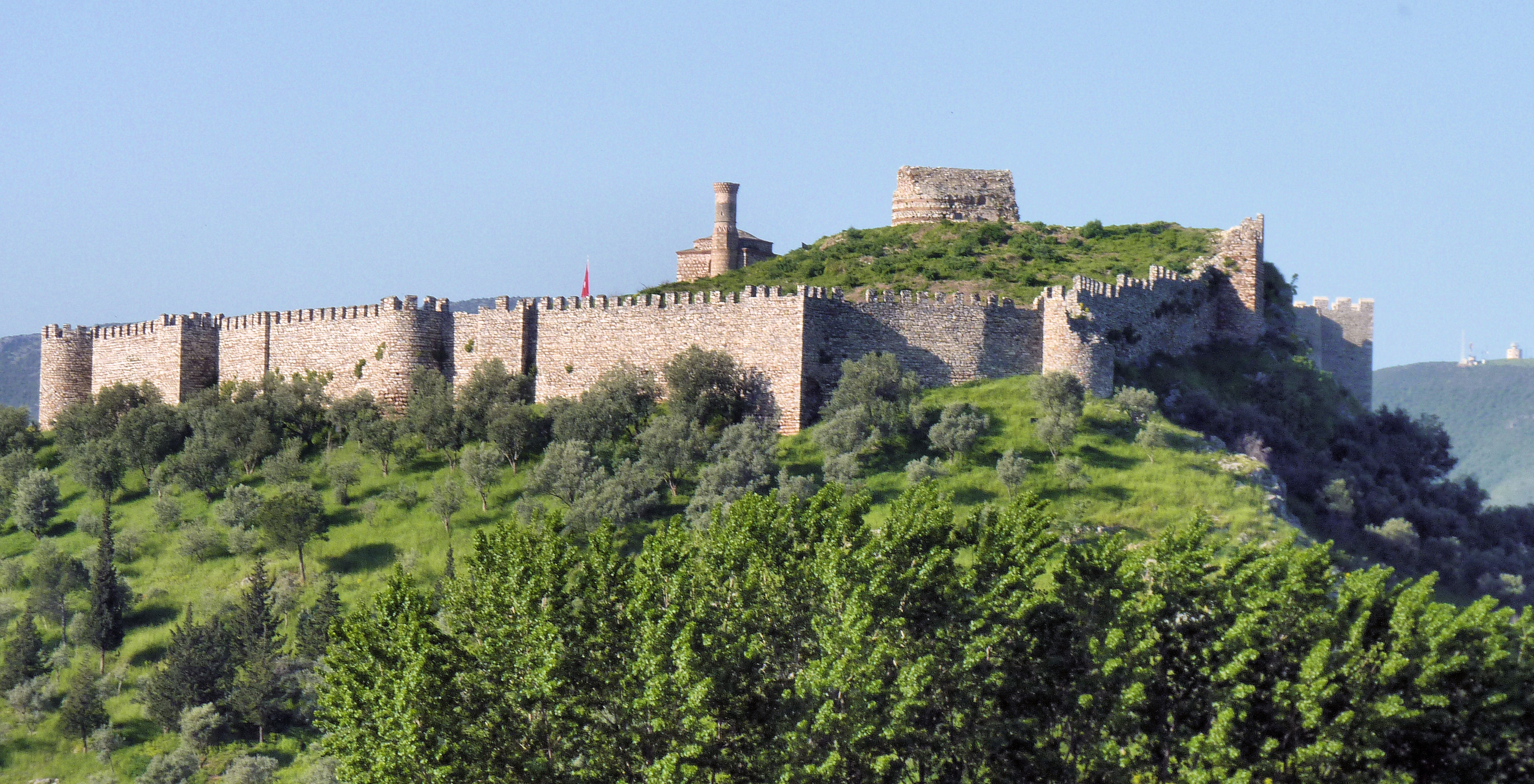
The citadel of Ayasoluk

By 1424, having dealt with threats in other areas, Murad turned against Junayd, intending to limit his domains to Smyrna and its surrounding region. According to Doukas, the Sultan sent Junayd a letter, requesting that Junayd send one of his sons as a hostage, as had been agreed at Lopadion. Junayd's reply is reported as: "Do as you like and leave the outcome to God." While Murad was occupied in the Balkans, he named Halil Yakhshi, a renegade Greek, as his commander in Anatolia. Yakhshi was brother-in-law of Bayezid Pasha, who had been executed on Junayd's insistence. Their armies met on the plain of Akhisar. (Note: The ancient and Byzantine city of Thyateira) Junayd's youngest son, Qurd, led a charge against the Ottoman lines. Yakhshi purposely had his men give way to the attack so that Qurd passed through and behind the Ottoman forces. His more cautious father remained behind. As a result, Qurd was captured by Yakhshi's men in an ambush. Junayd retreated, with Yakhshi capturing Ayasoluk and Tire. Yakhshi was appointed governor of the province of Aydın. Qurd was sent to Edirne, and then, with his uncle, Hamza, was incarcerated at Gallipoli. Junayd remained defiant, continuing his raids. During one of them, he captured a sister of Yakhshi, whom he later had executed. As a result, Murad sent the beylerbey of Anatolia, Oruj, to campaign against Junayd. Smyrna fell and Junayd retreated to the fortress of İpsili, (Note: Byzantine Hypsele; modern Doğanbey) on the Aegean coast, across from the island of Samos.

From İpsili, Junayd sent envoys to the Republic of Venice, seeking aid for himself and the son of Mustafa, who was with him. This had no practical result. Meanwhile, Oruj died and was succeeded by Hamza Bey, the brother of Bayezid, whose life Junayd had spared. Hamza Bey besieged İpsili. In 1425, Junayd went by ship to seek the aid of the bey of Karaman, but the latter, suspicious on account of his past experiences with him, provided a force of only 500 men and money. Marching overland with them, Junayd surprised the besiegers and scattered them in a night attack. On the next day, though, they regrouped and drove Junayd and his men back into the fortress. According to Doukas, even with the men from Karaman, Junayd's forces numbered barely 1,000 men. They were faced by an army many times that number – 50,000 according to Doukas. İpsili was well fortified and inaccessible from the landward side but exposed by sea. Hamza Bey requested the assistance of the Genoese of Chios. Three ships under Persivas Pallavicini arrived to complete the siege by sea. Their arrival demoralized the garrison and, on the very next night, the troops from Karaman opened the gates and departed the fortress. Only a few managed to escape the Ottoman besiegers. Fearing that the rest of his men would desert, Junayd contacted Yakhshi, who was leading the siege in Hamza's absence. He surrendered himself and the fortress, having obtained a pledge that he would be safely escorted before Murad to plead his case. According to Doukas, when Junayd arrived with his brother and family, Yakhshi provided them with tents for the night. When Hamza learned the events of the day, he sent four men to the tents, where they found Junayd "snoring loudly because he had not slept the previous night". The men bashed in Junayd's head, then cut off the heads of his brother, his son, and his grandsons. However, Irène Mélikoff suggests that the prisoners were executed by Yakhshi in revenge for his sister. When the Sultan learned of their deaths, he ordered the execution of Qurd and his uncle, Hamza, prisoners at Gallipoli - thus ending the Aydınid line.

== Sources ==
- Heywood, C. J. (1993). "Muṣṭafā Čelebi, Düzme". In Bosworth, C. E.; van Donzel, E.; Heinrichs, W. P. & Pellat, Ch. (eds.). The Encyclopaedia of Islam, Second Edition. Volume VII: Mif–Naz. Leiden: E. J. Brill. pp. 710–712. doi:10.1163/1573-3912_islam_COM_0815. ISBN 978-90-04-09419-2.
- İnalcık, Halil (1991). "Meḥemmed I". In Bosworth, C. E.; van Donzel, E. & Pellat, Ch. (eds.). The Encyclopaedia of Islam, Second Edition. Volume VI: Mahk–Mid. Leiden: E. J. Brill. pp. 973–978. doi:10.1163/1573-3912_islam_COM_0728. ISBN 978-90-04-08112-3.
- Kastritsis, Dimitris (2007). The Sons of Bayezid: Empire Building and Representation in the Ottoman Civil War of 1402-13. BRILL. ISBN 978-90-04-15836-8.
- Magoulias, Harry, ed. (1975). Decline and Fall of Byzantium to the Ottoman Turks, by Doukas. An Annotated Translation of "Historia Turco-Byzantina" by Harry J. Magoulias, Wayne State University. Detroit: Wayne State University Press. ISBN 978-0-8143-1540-8.
- Mélikoff, I. (1960). "Aydi̊̊n-Og̲h̲lu". In Gibb, H. A. R.; Kramers, J. H.; Lévi-Provençal, E.; Schacht, J.; Lewis, B. & Pellat, Ch. (eds.). The Encyclopaedia of Islam, Second Edition. Volume I: A–B. Leiden: E. J. Brill. p. 783. doi:10.1163/1573-3912_islam_SIM_0902. OCLC 495469456.
- Mélikoff, I. (1965). "D̲j̲unayd". In Lewis, B.; Pellat, Ch. & Schacht, J. (eds.). The Encyclopaedia of Islam, Second Edition. Volume II: C–G. Leiden: E. J. Brill. pp. 599–600. doi:10.1163/1573-3912_islam_SIM_2116. OCLC 495469475.
- Trapp, Erich; Beyer, Hans-Veit; Walther, Rainer; Sturm-Schnabl, Katja; Kislinger, Ewald; Leontiadis, Ioannis; Kaplaneres, Sokrates (1976–1996). Prosopographisches Lexikon der Palaiologenzeit (in German). Vienna: Verlag der Österreichischen Akademie der Wissenschaften. ISBN 3-7001-3003-1.
- Wittek, Paul (1934). Das Fürstentum Mentesche. Studien zur Geschichte Westkleinasiens im 13.-15. Jahrhundert (in German). Istanbul: Zaman Kitaphanesi.
- Zachariadou, Elisabeth A. (1983). Trade and Crusade: Venetian Crete and the Emirates of Menteshe and Aydin (1300–1415). Venice: Istituto Ellenico di Studi Bizantini e Post-bizantini di Venezia. OCLC 144691037.
- Zachariadou, Elisabeth A. (1991). "Aydin". In Kazhdan, Alexander (ed.). The Oxford Dictionary of Byzantium. Oxford and New York: Oxford University Press. pp. 239–240. ISBN 0-19-504652-8.
