= John Anagnostes =

John, called Anagnostes (i.e. lector, reader; Greek: Ἰωάννης Ἀναγνώστης), was a Greek historian of the fifteenth century. He was an eyewitness to the Ottoman sack of Thessalonica on March 29, 1430; an event he described in detail in his Account of the Last Capture of Thessalonica (Διήγησις περί τῆς τελευταίας άλώσεως τῆς Θεσσαλονίχης), which he wrote with an accompanying monody lamenting the city's fall.

== Background ==
Thessalonica had been captured by the Ottomans in 1387; though they were unable to hold the city in the wake of the Battle of Ankara in 1402 when it reverted to the Byzantine Empire. The Byzantines, when they were unable to hold the city, sold it to the Republic of Venice in 1423; though not in time to mount a defense against another Ottoman siege that year. The Ottomans were again unable to hold the city permanently, and the Venetians and Ottomans were soon in a full state of war.

== Siege of Thessalonica ==
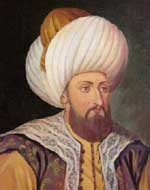
Ottoman sultan Murad II

Beginning on March 29, 1430, the Ottoman sultan Murad II began a three-day siege of Thessalonica, resulting in the conquest of the city by the Ottoman army, and the taking of 7,000 inhabitants as slaves. The Venetians agreed to a peace treaty and withdrew from the region in 1432, leaving the Ottomans with permanent dominion over the region.
