= Makarios Melissenos =

Makarios Melissenos (Greek: Μακάριος Μελισσηνός), born Makarios Melissourgos (Μακάριος Μελισσουργός), was a Greek scholar and metropolitan bishop of Monemvasia. He died in 1585.

== Life ==
Born Makarios Melissourgos in the Morea to a wealthy landowning family, Makarios was metropolitan bishop of Monemvasia. In 1571, he was forced to flee his homeland for Naples when he became involved in a plot for an uprising against the Ottoman Empire in the aftermath of the Battle of Lepanto.

At Naples, he changed his name to Melissenos, echoing the Byzantine aristocratic family, and produced several works. Among them was a list of the bishops of Monemvasia, a history and description of the city, and a list of members of the Melissenos family. He also collaborated with Andreas Darmarios to produce the Chronicon Maius (1573–75), an expanded revision of George Sphrantzes' Chronicon Minus with additional material from George Akropolites, Nikephoros Gregoras, and other writers (whence he is also called Pseudo-Sphrantzes). Covering the period 1258 to 1477, it is an important historical source, particularly for his eyewitness account of the Fall of Constantinople in 1453, although doubts regarding the authenticity of his material remain. Earlier scholarship believed that Melissenos was also responsible for forging a chrysobull ascribed to Emperor Andronikos II with the intention of legitimizing increased powers for himself as metropolitan. However, this position has more recently been challenged by Haris Kalligas, who has reevaluated the evidence and dates the bull as authentic to 1314. Makarios Melissenos died at Naples in 1585.

== Sources ==
- Kazhdan, Alexander, ed. (1991). The Oxford Dictionary of Byzantium. Oxford and New York: Oxford University Press. ISBN 978-0-19-504652-6.
