= Demetrios Laskaris Leontares =

Byzantine statesman and military leader

Demetrios Laskaris Leontares or Leontarios (Greek: Δημήτριος Λάσκαρις Λεοντάρης, died 6 September 1431) was an important Byzantine statesman and military leader of the early 15th century, serving under the emperors Manuel II Palaiologos (r. 1391–1425) and John VIII Palaiologos (r. 1425–1448).

== Biography ==
Nothing is known of Leontares's early life, except a statement by the historian Doukas that Leontares had served with distinction as an officer in the Morea and Thessaly in the 1390s. Leontares first appears in the historical sources in 1403. As a close friend and trusted agent of Manuel II, he escorted John VII Palaiologos to Thessalonica, the Byzantine Empire's second city, which John VII had been granted as a semi-independent appanage by Manuel. Leontares remained in the city and served as John VII's advisor and liaison to Manuel II until the former's death in 1408. At this point, Manuel placed him as tutor and regent over his young son, the despotes Andronikos Palaiologos, who succeeded John VII as governor of Thessalonica.

Leontares remained in Thessalonica as its effective governor until 1415/16, when the Ottoman prince Düzmece Mustafa and Junayd of Aydın fled to the city after a failed attempt to seize the Ottomans' European domains from Mehmed I (r. 1413–1421). Mehmed demanded the surrender of the rebel, but Leontares referred him to Manuel II in Constantinople. Eventually, a deal was reached whereby Mustafa would be kept in exile in the Byzantine island of Lemnos and Junayd in Constantinople, in exchange for an annual subsidy of 300,000 aspers. Leontares himself escorted Mustafa on the ship to Constantinople.

In late 1420/early 1421 and again in May 1421, Leontares was dispatched by Manuel II to Mehmed I in missions of good will, as reports of preparations for an Ottoman attack on Constantinople increased. The first meeting occurred during a crossing of the Bosphorus by Mehmed. Leontares, at the head of a group of Byzantine aristocrats and officials and supplied with gifts, met Mehmed at the Constantinopolitan suburb of Koutoulos (probably modern Kurtuluş) and escorted him to Diplokionion (modern Beşiktaş), where the Emperor and his sons awaited in their galley. The second meeting was a full embassy to the Sultan's residence in Adrianople in May 1421, perhaps connected with a purported amendment in Mehmed's will that would have made Manuel guardian of his two younger sons. Leontares was cordially received, but negotiations were prevented by Mehmed's death on 21 May. To prevent another struggle for succession, his death was kept secret for a while, and Leontares found himself under virtual house arrest. Only with difficulty did he manage to find out news of the Sultan's death and report them to Constantinople.

Following the death of Mehmed, the hawkish party in the Byzantine court, headed by Manuel II's son and co-emperor John VIII, became ascendant, and Manuel II resigned effective control of the state to him. Leontares released Mustafa and Junayd from their exile, and the Ottoman prince was promised imperial support against Murad II if he would surrender the strategically important fortress of Gallipoli. With Byzantine support, Mustafa besieged and took Gallipoli, and managed to quickly establish his authority over the Ottomans' European domains. However, when Leontares was dispatched to demand Gallipoli from Mustafa, he was rebuffed. In the event, Mustafa was defeated by Murad in spring 1422, abandoned by his supporters, caught and executed.

Leontares appears again in 1427, when he headed the Byzantine fleet in its last naval victory, over the forces of Carlo I Tocco (r. 1411–1429) at the Battle of the Echinades. He later retired to a monastery, under the monastic name Daniel, and died probably on 6 September 1431. He was buried at the Petra Monastery in Constantinople. Markos Eugenikos and Gennadios Scholarios wrote funeral eulogies in his honour.

=== Family ===
Little is known of Leontares' ancestry, however the history of his descendants is recorded in a series of family chronicles written in the 15th century.

- Demetrios Laskaris Leontares (c.1360s–6 Sep. 1431).
  - John Laskaris Leontares (c.1380s–9 Jan. 1437) served as a general and governor of Selymbria. Husband of Maria Laskarina Leontarina (died 16 Jan. 1450) and author of the second family chronicle recording the births of his twelve children.
    - Anna Laskarina Leontarina (21 Nov. 1408?–before 1434).
    - Demetrios Leontares (30 Oct. 1413–before 1434).
    - Eirene Leontarina (born 25 Jan. 1415–before 1434).
    - Euphrosyne (born 11 Jun. 1416–before 1434).
    - Demetrios Laskaris Leontares (12 Nov. 1418–after 1475) author of the third family chronicle recording the deaths of his mother and wife. Worked as a copyist in Southern Italy following the Fall of Constantinople. Husband of Euphrosyne Palaiologina Leontarina (died 30 March 1455?) daughter of Demetrios Palaiologos Metochites.
      - Three daughters and one son.
    - Manuel Bryennios Leontares and Georgios Bryennios Leontares (born 20 Dec. 1420–before 1434).
    - Theodoros Leontares (born 3 Dec. 1424).
    - Michael Leontares (23 May 1426–after 1462) travelled with his brother Demetrios Laskaris around Western Europe in the years 1459-1462.
    - Eirene Leontarina (born 23 Jun. c.1430).
    - Theodora Leontarina (20 Oct. c.1430–before 1434).
    - Manuel Leontares (born 5 Feb. 1434).
- Anonymous Leontares (c.1360s–died after 1437) author of the first family chronicle, recording the deaths of his brother Demetrios Laskaris Leontares and nephew John Laskaris Leontares.

== Sources ==
- Barker, John (1969). Manuel II Paleologus (1391–1425): A Study in Late Byzantine Statesmanship. New Brunswick, New Jersey: Rutgers University Press. ISBN 0-8135-0582-8.
- Necipoğlu, Nevra (2009). Byzantium between the Ottomans and the Latins: Politics and Society in the Late Empire. Cambridge: Cambridge University Press. ISBN 978-1-107-40388-8.
- Nicol, Donald M. (1993). The Last Centuries of Byzantium, 1261–1453 (Second ed.). Cambridge: Cambridge University Press. ISBN 978-0-521-43991-6.
- Rance, Philip (2022). "Finding the Right Words: a Letter to the Emperor (Laur. plut. 55.4, f. 197v) – Books, Education and Rhetoric in a Late Byzantine Household". Parekbolai (12): 27–56.
- Schreiner, Peter (1975). Die byzantinischen Kleinchroniken, I: Einleitung und Text. Österreichischen Akademie der Wissenschaften.
- Setton, Kenneth M. (1978). The Papacy and the Levant (1204–1571), Volume II: The Fifteenth Century. Philadelphia: The American Philosophical Society. ISBN 0-87169-127-2.
- Sideras, Alexander (1994), Die Byzantinischen Grabreden: Prosopographie, Datierung, Überlieferung. 142 Epitaphien und Monodien aus dem Byzantinischen Jahrtausend (in German), Vienna: Verlag der Österreichischen Akademie der Wissenschaften, ISBN 978-3-7001-2159-6
- Trapp, Erich; Beyer, Hans-Veit; Sturm-Schnabl, Katja (1983). "14676. Λεοντάρης, Δημήτριος Λάσκαρις". Prosopographisches Lexikon der Palaiologenzeit (in German). Vol. 6. Vienna: Verlag der Österreichischen Akademie der Wissenschaften. ISBN 3-7001-3003-1.
