= Andreas Darmarios =

Greek copyist and forger

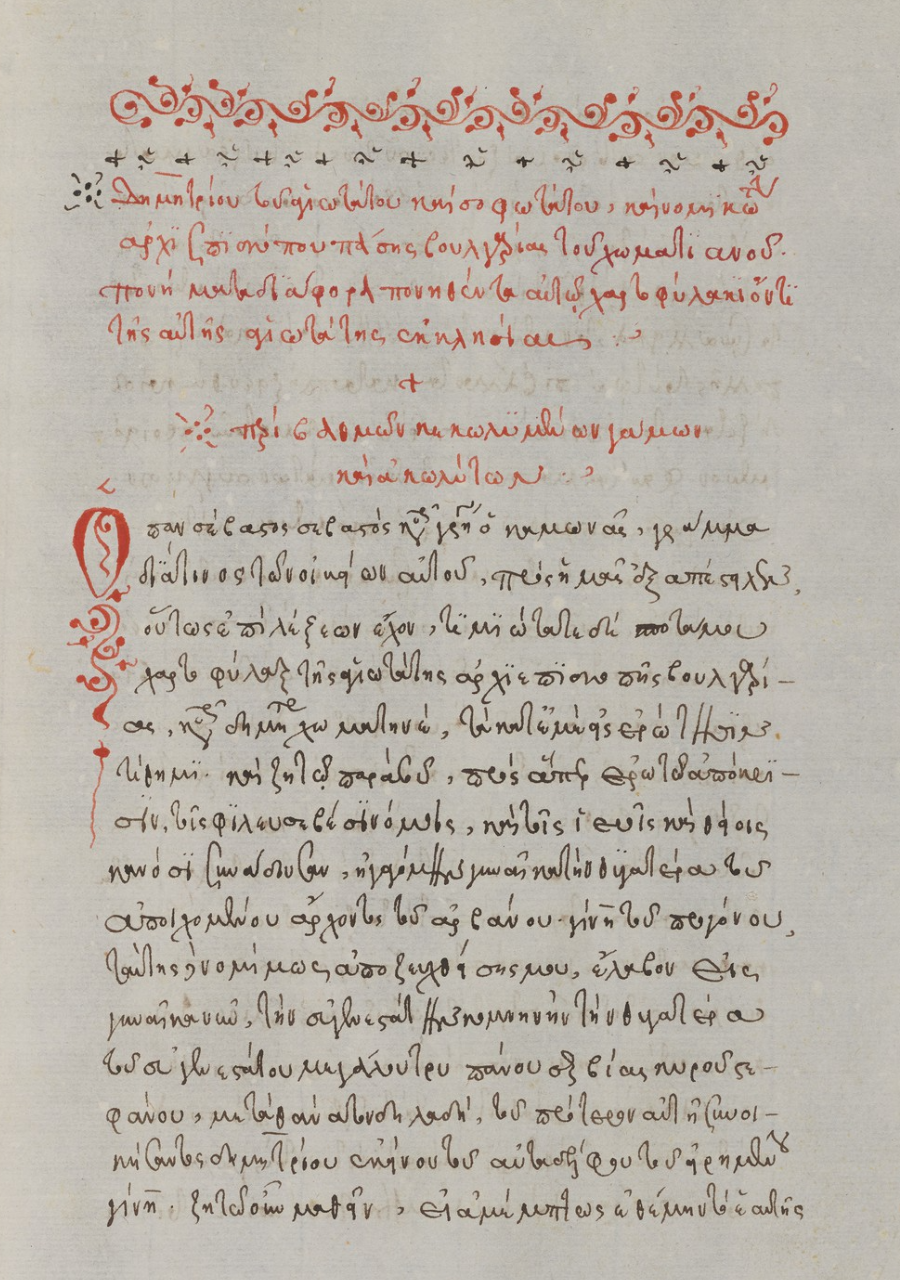
A manuscript of Demetrios Chomatenos' Ponemata diaphora copied by Darmarios in 1563–1564

Andreas Darmarios (Note: Greek: Ἀνδρέας Δαρμάριος. His surname may be Latinized Darmarius and his first name anglicized as Andrew.) (1540–c. 1590) was a Greek scribe, manuscript dealer and forger.

Darmarios was born in Monemvasia in 1540. In one colophon, he refers to himself as an Epidaurian. He relocated from Greece to Venice around 1563. Although Venice remained his primary home, he made at least eleven trips to Spain between 1570 and 1587. His main stops were Madrid and Salamanca. He visited Tübingen in 1584. He probably retired to Spain, dying there in 1587 or 1591.

Darmarios was a scribe and also a trader who employed scribes. He made numerous copies of the Greek classics for noble patrons. He was probably the most prolific seller of classical manuscripts in the second half of the 16th century. Among his patrons and clients were King Philip II of Spain and numerous humanists, including Álvar Gómez de Castro, Andreas Schott, Antonio Agustín, and Bartolomé Llorente.

Darmarios has been accused of serious forgery. He certainly falsified titles and attributions in many cases. In the 17th century, David Colville accused him of introducing errors and falsehoods in every manuscript he touched. Often these false attributions were intended to increase the value of the manuscripts. He attributed a series of anonymous scholia he collected to John Tzetzes. He conspired with another Greek scribe active in Venice, Nicholas Choniates, to falsely attribute some anonymous scholia to Thomas Magister, to alter the attribution of the Chronicon of George Hamartolos to a certain John Sikeliotes and to attribute a Selections from the Prophets to Michael Syncellus. The extent of Darmarios' forgery and whether or not it was limited to titles and attributions—"the production of new works of old authors"—is of importance because several texts can be traced back only as far as copies he made.
