= Apostolos Vacalopoulos =

Greek historian

Apostolos Evangelou Vacalopoulos
- Απόστολος Ευαγγέλου Βακαλόπουλος
- Born: 11 August 1909; Volos, Greece
- Died: 10 July 2000 (aged 90); Thessaloniki, Greece
- Education: Aristotle University of Thessaloniki
- Awards: Herder Prize (1979)
- Scientific career
- Fields: History
- Workplaces: Aristotle University of Thessaloniki; Society for Macedonian Studies; Institute for Balkan Studies

Apostolos Evangelou Vacalopoulos (Greek: Απόστολος Ευαγγέλου Βακαλόπουλος; 11 August 1909 – 10 July 2000) was a distinguished Greek historian, specializing in the Byzantine Empire, Ottoman Greece, and in modern Greek history. Vakalopoulos has been described as one of the greatest Greek historians of the 20th century.

== Biography ==
Apostolos Vakalopoulos was born on 11 August 1909, in Volos, but grew up in Thessaloniki, where his family had settled in 1914. He graduated from the newly established Philological Faculty of the Aristotle University of Thessaloniki, and initially worked as a high school teacher in the 1930s.

In 1939, Vacalopoulos completed his doctorate at the University of Thessaloniki, and began a tenure as lecturer at the university's Philological Faculty in 1943, eventually becoming a professor in 1951. Vacalopoulos continued in the same position until his retirement in 1974. He was awarded the Herder Prize in 1979.

Vacalopoulos was a founding member of the Society for Macedonian Studies in 1939, and a fixed presence in its board of governors. He also served as chairman of the Institute for Balkan Studies. Among numerous publications, the most well-known was his eight-volume History of Modern Hellenism series.

Vacalopoulos died in Thessaloniki on 10 July 2000.
