= Battle of İnceğiz =

- Part of the Ottoman Interregnum
Date	1411 or 1412
Location	İnceğiz‍, Thrace
Result	Victory for Musa Çelebi

Belligerents
Forces of Musa Çelebi	Forces of Mehmed Çelebi

Commanders and leaders
Musa Çelebi	Mehmed Çelebi

Units involved
7,000 Kapıkulu	unknown

The Battle of İnceğiz was fought sometime in late 1411 or early 1412 near Constantinople between the rival sons of the Ottoman Sultan Bayezid I, Mehmed Çelebi and Musa Çelebi, during the final stages of the civil war known as the Ottoman Interregnum.

== Background ==
Musa had become the ruler of the Ottomans' European domains after overthrowing and killing his brother Süleyman Çelebi in 1410–11. Unlike Süleyman, Musa, who relied greatly on the akinji raiders, followed a policy extremely hostile to his Christian neighbours. The attacks against both the Byzantine Empire and Serbia, that had stopped after the Treaty of Gallipoli in 1403, resumed: in Serbia, Musa besieged Smederovo, while against Byzantium he attacked Thessalonica and Selymbria, and placed Constantinople under blockade in August 1411.

== Mehmed's alliance with Byzantium and the battle ==
As a result, the Byzantine emperor Manuel II Palaiologos turned to Musa's brother, Mehmed Çelebi, who had established his rule over the Ottoman territories in Anatolia. The anonymous Ottoman chronicle Ahval-i Sultan Mehemmed ("Affairs of Sultan Mehmed"), the Byzantine historian Doukas, and the Serbian historian Konstantin the Philosopher all report that Manuel sent envoys to Mehmed, offering an alliance against Musa, on the same terms as the previous arrangement with Süleyman. The two rulers met at Scutari and swore that if they won, Mehmed would maintain friendly relations with the Byzantines; if they lost, he would be allowed refuge in Constantinople.

The exact site of İnceğiz and the date of the battle are unknown: it may have been fought either in autumn of 1411 or in spring of 1412. The Aḥvāl reports that the van of Mehmed's army comprised Tatars and Turcomans from the Rum Eyalet, the "army of Ankara", and the forces of the Turcoman leader Yapaoğlu. According to Doukas, a few Byzantine troops also fought under Mehmed. Musa on the other hand disposed of 7,000 kapıkulu, who played a decisive role in the battle. Mehmed's forces prevailed at the start of the battle, but then the kapıkulu managed to advance up to Mehmed and even wound his horse. The defeated Mehmed was forced to retreat to Constantinople, and thence cross again over to Anatolia.

== Sources ==
- Kastritsis, Dimitris (2007). The Sons of Bayezid: Empire Building and Representation in the Ottoman Civil War of 1402-13. BRILL. ISBN 978-90-04-15836-8.
- Magoulias, Harry, ed. (1975). Decline and Fall of Byzantium to the Ottoman Turks, by Doukas. An Annotated Translation of "Historia Turco-Byzantina" by Harry J. Magoulias, Wayne State University. Detroit: Wayne State University Press. ISBN 0-8143-1540-2.
