= Selçuk Hatun =

Ottoman princess (1407–1485)

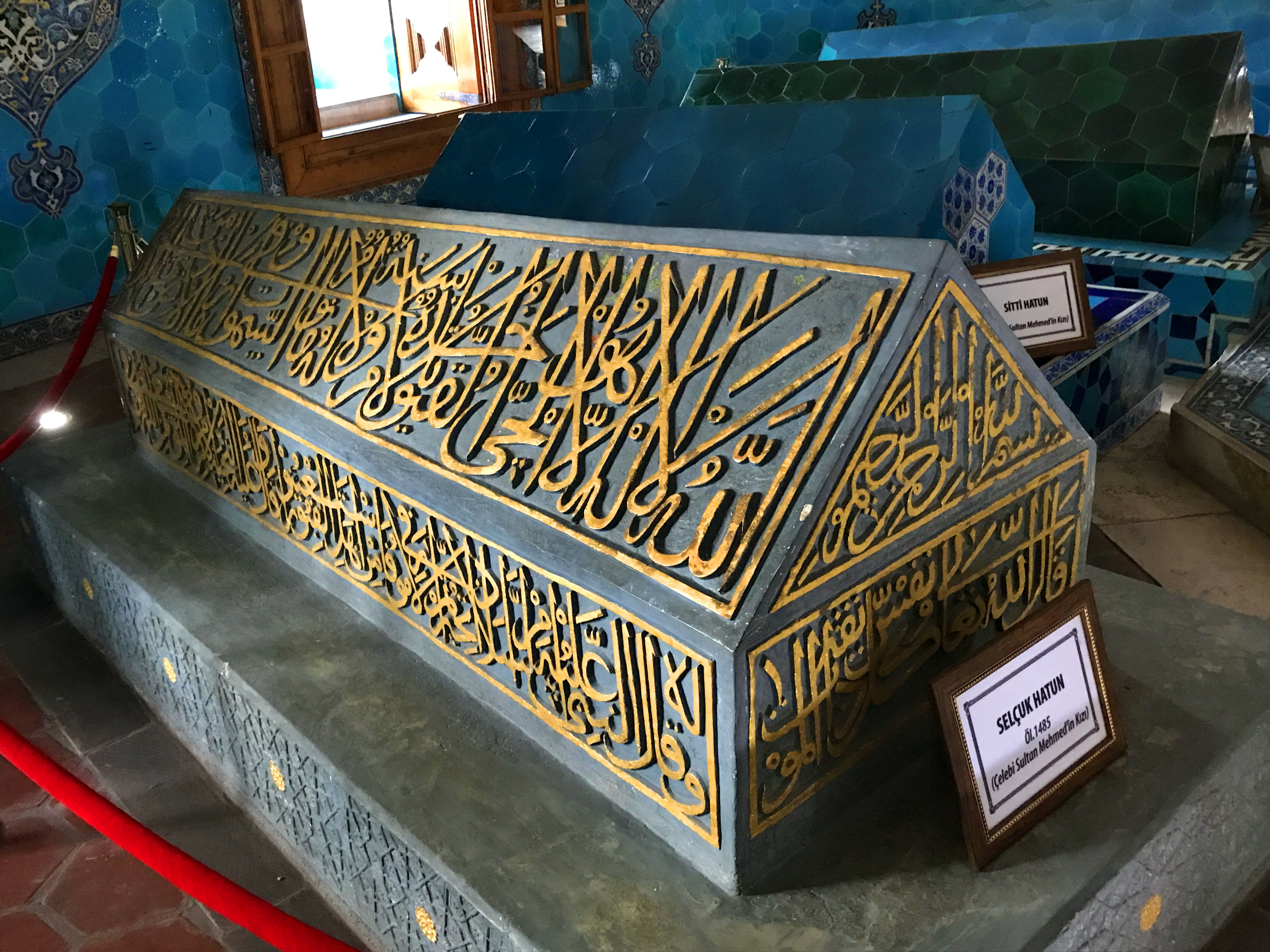
- Selçuk Hatun's sarcophagus
- Born: c. 1407; Merzifon, Ottoman Empire (modern-day Turkey)
- Died: 25 October 1485 (aged 77–78); Bursa, Ottoman Empire (modern-day Turkey)
- Burial: Green Tomb, Bursa
- Spouse: Taceddin Ibrahim II Bey (m. 1425; died 1443); Anadolu Beylerbeyi Karaca Pasha (m. 1443; died 1444)
- Issue: First marriage; Orhan Bey; Paşa Melek Hatun; Emir Yusuf Bey; Hafsa Hatun; Hatice Hanzade Hatun; Ishak Bali Bey; Second marriage; Hundi Hatun
- Dynasty: Ottoman
- Father: Mehmed I
- Mother: Kumru Hatun
- Religion: Sunni Islam

Selçuk Hatun (Ottoman Turkish: سلچوق خاتون; c. 1407 – 25 October 1485) was an Ottoman princess, the daughter of Ottoman Sultan Mehmed I and one of his concubines, Kumru Hatun. She was the half-sister of Sultan Murad II.

== Early life ==
Selçuk Hatun was born in 1407 in Merzifon. Her father was Mehmed I and her mother was the concubine Kumru Hatun.

Due to Ottoman Interregnum, her father resided in the different places. After the political turmoil ended with her father defeating his brothers in 1413, he finally succeeded the throne and Selçuk Hatun moved to Edirne in the Edirne Palace and spent her childhood years there. After her father's death in 1421, her older half-brother Murad II succeeded to the throne and she moved to Bursa.

== Marriages ==
In 1425, her brother arranged her marriage to Taceddin Ibrahim II Bey, he was the son of Candaroğlu İsfendiyar Bey, the ruler of Kastamonu and Sinop. She was eighteen years old at the time of her marriage, following her wedding she moved to Kastamonu.

Together with Ibrahim Bey, she had six children, three sons and three daughters. Her sons included Orhan Bey, Emir Yusuf Bey and Ishak Bali Bey, all of her sons died in childhood and infancy. Their daughters included Paşa Melek Hatun, Hafsa Hatun and Hatice Hanzade Hatun, who was the only one among her children to survive into adulthood.

After the death of her father-in-law in 1439, her husband Ibrahim Bey, became the ruler of Kastamonu. After his death, she moved back to Bursa in 1443. In the same year she remarried with Beylerbeyi Karaca Mahmud Pasha, who died in the Battle of Varna in 1444. In 1445, Selçuk give birth a posthumously daughter, Hundi Hatun.

== Political affairs ==
In 1481, after the death of her nephew Mehmed the Conqueror, a fight for the throne began between the two sons of Mehmed. Şehzade Bayezid and Cem Sultan rebelled against each other for the throne. She sided with Cem Sultan, when he unofficially declared himself as the sultan at her palace in Bursa on 31 May 1481. She saw Cem as a passionate, valiant and knowledgeable candidate for the throne. At her palace in Bursa, she had tried to gather many persons in order to stand against Bayezid.

When Bayezid started to march towards Bursa Sultan Cem had sent her to Bayezid as an ambassador after consulting the scholars in Bursa. The proposal was that Rumelia will be given to Bayezid and Anatolia to Cem, however this would destroy the unity of the country and divide it in two, she returned without getting results. On 22 June 1481, Bayezid managed to throw Cem off the throne and succeeded to the throne and he was exiled to Naples, where he died. Selçuk Hatun returned to Bursa, where she spent her remaining years.

== Charities ==
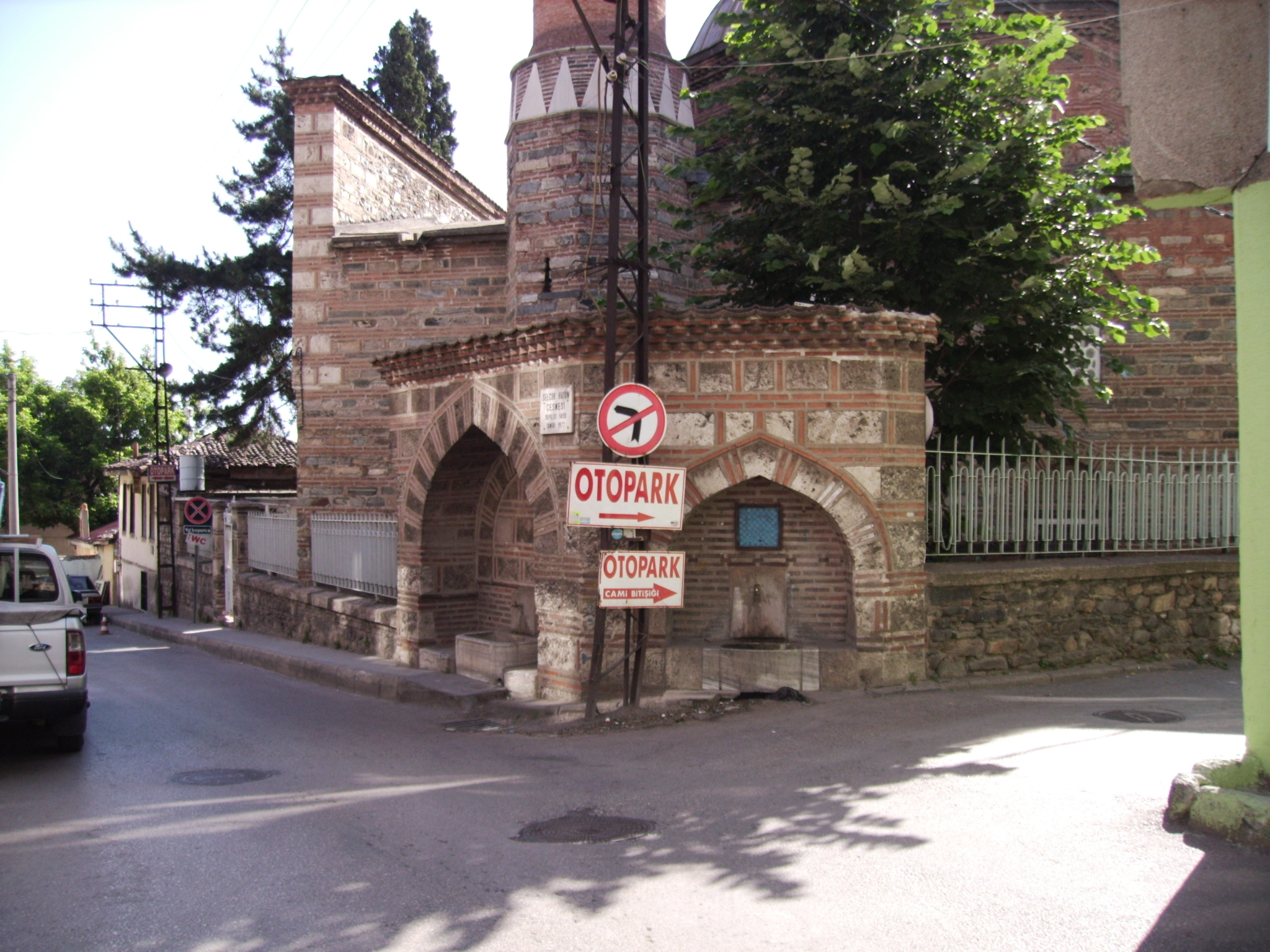
Selçuk Hatun Mosque Bursa

Selçuk Hatun built a mosque in her name near the Irgandı Bridge in 1450 in Bursa. She also constructed an imaret, which provided fresh and free food to the poor. In Edirne, she constructed another mosque in her name. She contributed exclusively in the development of Edirne.

In Bursa, she also commissioned a soup kitchen, where fresh food was served to the poor on daily basis. She constructed a bridge on the Nilüfer Creek on the road route from Bursa to Karacabey. In addition to that, she also commissioned a guesthouse, school and two fountains in the same district. She also established a religious lodge in Balıkesir, where money was donated daily for charity purposes, under the auspices of Hacı Halife. She also constructed a social complex in Manisa. In Kastamonu, she commissioned a tomb where her children and many of her freed slaves had been buried.

Selçuk Hatun constructed another mosque in her name in Istanbul in the district of Aksaray following the conquest of Istanbul, and was constructed during the reign of her nephew, Mehmed. The mosque was burnt down due to fire, and was later reconstructed by Abbas Ağa, in the sixteenth century. In 1956, it was again demolished as a result of widening of the area, but later rebuilt by Ali Saim Ülgen in 1964.

In addition to her charitable nature, Selçuk appears to have been an extremely wealthy woman who regularly paid high stipends to her several freed slaves and household staff.

== Death ==
In 1484, Selçuk Hatun fell extremely ill, therefore Bayezid II had sent Yakut, the renowned physician in the empire to treat her but to no avail. She died on 25 October 1485 and was buried in the mausoleum of her father Mehmed I Mausoleum, in Green Tomb, Bursa, Turkey. She lived as a courtier during the reigns of her father, Mehmed, half-brother Murad, nephew Mehmed and grand-nephew Bayezid and was one of the longest lived princesses.

== Issue ==
By her first husband, Selçuk Hatun had three sons and three daughters:

- Orhan Bey (c. 1425 – November 1429. Buried in Kastamonu, in the Sultan Hatun's türbe)
- Paşa Melek Hatun (c. 1426 – c. 1436. Buried in Kastamonu, in the Sultan Hatun's türbe.)
- Emir Yusuf Bey (c. 1427 – September 1441. Buried in Kastamonu, in the Sultan Hatun's türbe.)
- Hafsa Hatun (c. 1428 – May 1442. Buried in Kastamonu, in the Sultan Hatun's türbe.)
- Hatice Hanzade Hatun (? – 15 December 1502). She married Mahmud Çelebi, son of Koca Mehmed Pasha, and had five daughters, Hundi Hatun (who had a daughter, Ayşe Hatun), Zeynep Hatun, Fatma Hatun, Hanzade Hatun and Şahzade Hatun, and a son, Süleyman Bey. Later, she remarried with Koçi Bey, and had a son, Ahmed Bey. She was buried in Yeni Kaplıçi street, Bursa.
- Ishak Bali Bey (? – ?). Died in infancy, buried in Kastamonu, in the Sultan Hatun's türbe.

By her second husband, she had a daughter:

- Hundi Hatun (c. 1445 – ?). She was born posthumously and died in infancy. Buried in Kastamonu, in the Sultan Hatun's türbe.

== In popular culture ==
- In the 2024 historical fiction series Mehmed: Fetihler Sultanı, Selçuk Hatun was portrayed by Turkish actress Perihan Savaş.

== Ancestry ==
Ancestors of Selçuk Hatun

8. Murad I
4. Bayezid I
9. Gülçiçek Hatun
2. Mehmed I
5. Devlet Hatun
1. Selçuk Hatun
3. Kumru Hatun

== Sources ==
- Uluçay, Mustafa Çağatay (2011). Padişahların kadınları ve kızları. Ankara, Ötüken.
- Sakaoğlu, Necdet (2008). Bu mülkün kadın sultanları: Vâlide sultanlar, hâtunlar, hasekiler, kadınefendiler, sultanefendiler. Oğlak Yayıncılık. ISBN 978-9-753-29623-6.
- Gündüz, Ahmet (2018). Çelebi Mehmed'in Kızı Selçuk Hatun Vakıfları.
- Yakupoğlu, Cevdet (2013). CANDAROĞULLARI SARAYINDA BİR OSMANLI GELİNİ SELÇUK HATUN.
