= Hüma Hatun =

Consort of Ottoman Sultan Murad II and mother of Mehmed II

- Dürretü tâcü’n-nisâ fi’l-âlemîn Gurretü cebheti’l-İslâm ve’l-müslimîn Meliketü’l-melikât; Müsdiletü siyâbi’l-hasenât ve’l-meberrât Es-sittü’l-celîle

Valide Hatun of the Ottoman Sultanate
- Tenure: August 1444 – September 1446
- Predecessor: Emine Hatun
- Successor: Emine Hatun or Gülbahar Hatun
- Born: c. 1410
- Died: September 1449 (aged 38–39); Bursa, Ottoman Sultanate
- Burial: Muradiye Complex, Bursa
- Consort of: Murad II
- Issue: Mehmed II
- Religion: Sunni Islam (converted)

Hüma Hatun (Ottoman Turkish: هما خاتون; c. 1410 – September 1449) was the wife of Ottoman Sultan Murad II and the mother of his successor, Mehmed II.

== Life ==
Her exact place of birth, family background and origin is unknown. However an Ottoman inscription (waqf document) refers to her as “Hâtun binti Abdullah,” which, given that converts to Islam at the time were often given the name Abdullah, indicates a non-Muslim background. Hüma Hatun was most likely a concubine. The origins of Hüma are controversial. According to traditional accounts, the mother of Mehmed II was Hatice Halime Hatun, granddaughter of İsfendiyar Bey of the Candaroğulları dynasty. According to other accounts, she was an Italian and/or Jewish girl named Stella or Esther. Serbian, Greek, Macedonian, Montenegrin, Hungarian, or French origins have also been attributed to her. However, none of these claims have been proven. According to historian Feridun Emecen, apart from the fact that Hüma Hatun was a concubine, the other claims about her are highly unlikely to be true. Her name, hüma, means "bird of paradise/phoenix", after the Persian legend.

Hüma Hatun gave birth to her only son, the future Sultan Mehmed the Conqueror, in 1432. In 1438, Mehmed was circumcised along with his elder half-brother, Şehzade Alaeddin. When Mehmed was 11 years old, he was sent to Manisa as a prince governor. Hüma followed her son to Manisa. Her children's wet nurses were Hundi Hatun (d. 14 February 1486): usually styled Daye Hatun (lady governess), who became very wealthy and influential enough during the reign of Mehmed II, enough to fund several charitable foundations and commission prayers for her soul, and Gülbahar Hatun, called also Ebe Hatun (lady midwife), buried in her own türbe in the Muradiye Complex, Bursa.

In 1444, after the death of Mehmed's elder half-brother, Şehzade Alaeddin, who died in 1443, Mehmed was the only heir left to the throne. In that same year, Murad II abdicated the throne due to depression over the death of his son, Şehzade Alaeddin Ali Çelebi, and retreated to Manisa.

Her son Şehzade Mehmed succeeded the throne as Mehmed II. She held the Vâlide Hatun position for two years. In 1446, Murad took over the throne again, and Hüma and her son returned to Bursa. However, Mehmed succeeded the throne in 1451, after the death of his father, but she never became a Valide Hatun as she died before the accession.

== Death ==
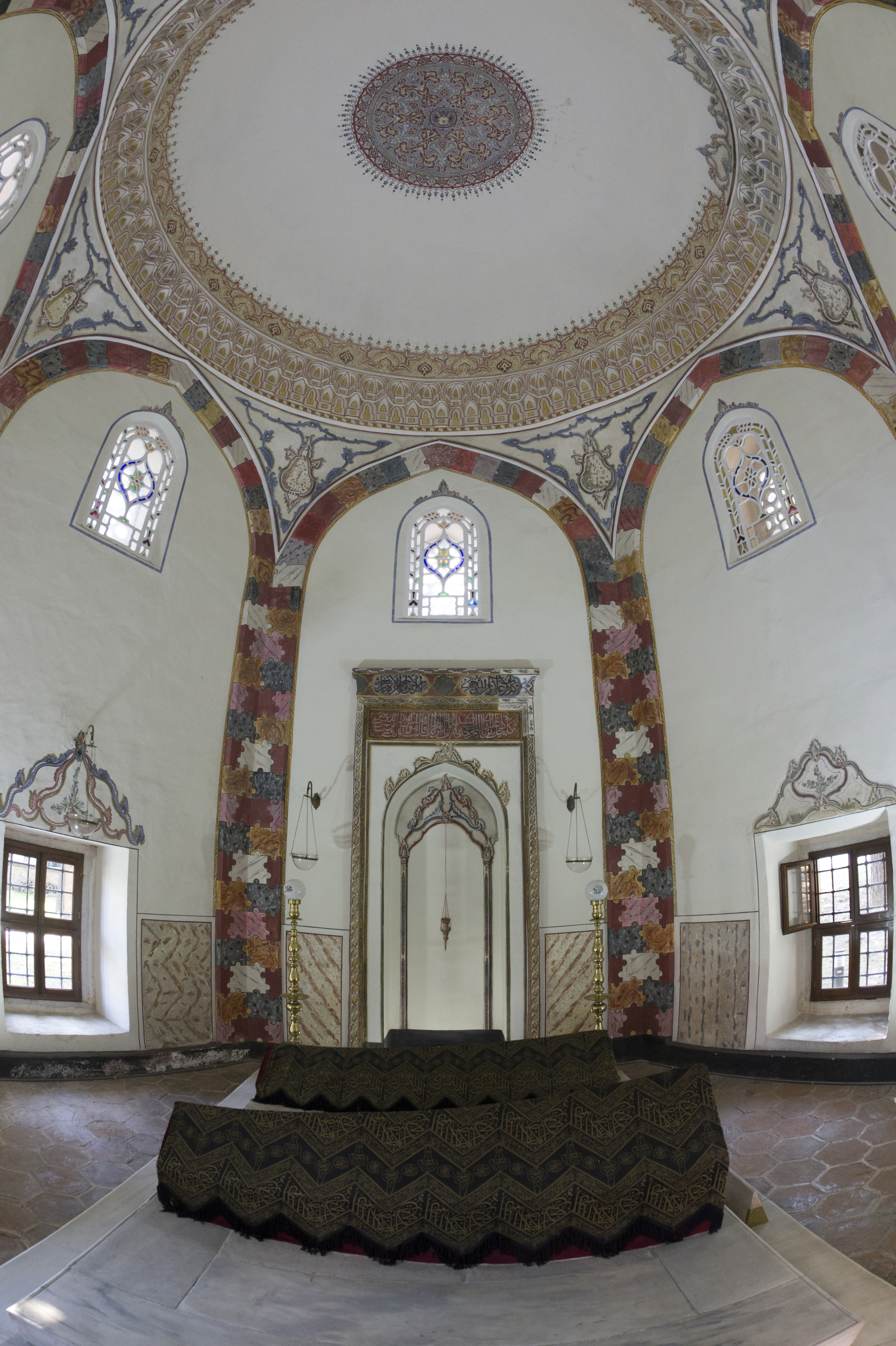
The sarcophagus of Hüma Hatun is located inside Muradiye Complex, in Bursa, Turkey

She died in September 1449 in Bursa, two years before her son's second accession to the throne. Her tomb is located at the site known as "Hatuniye Kümbedi" (Hatuniye Tomb) to the east of Muradiye Complex, which was built by her son Mehmed. The quarter where her tomb lies has been known thus far as Hüma Hatun Quarter.

In the tugra commissioned by Mehmed the Conqueror for this tomb, Hüma Hatun is referred to as:

"Dürretü tâcü'n-nisâ fi'l-âlemîn, Gurretü cebheti'l-İslâm ve'l-müslimîn, Meliketü'l-melikât, Müsdiletü siyâbi'l-hasenât ve'l-meberrât, Es-sittü'l-celîle."

Meaning:

"The pearl of the crown of women in the world, the radiance of the forehead of Islam and the Muslims, the queen of queens, one adorned with garments of goodness and charity, the noble and exalted lady."

== Issue ==
- Mehmed II (1432–1481). Sultan of the Ottoman Empire after his father and conqueror of Constantinople in 1453.

== In popular culture ==
- Hüma Hatun was portrayed by Leyla Feray in the docuseries Rise of Empires: Ottoman (2020).
- Zeynep Köse portrayed Hüma Hatun in Kızılelma: Bir Fetih Öyküsü
- Açelya Akkoyun portrayed Hüma Hatun in Mehmed: Fetihler Sultanı (2024).

== See also ==
- List of consorts of the Ottoman sultans
- List of mothers of the Ottoman sultans

Ottoman royalty
Preceded by Devlet Hatun	Valide Hatun; August 1444 ‒ September 1446	Succeeded by Gülbahar Hatun
