= Emine Hatun =

Wife of Sultan Mehmed I

Valide Hatun of the Ottoman Empire (disputed)
- Tenure: 26 May 1421 – August 1444
- Predecessor: Devlet Hatun
- Successor: Hüma Hatun
- Second Tenure: September 1446 – 1449
- Predecessor: Hüma Hatun
- Successor: Gülbahar Hatun
- Born: Elbistan, Dulkadirids
- Died: 1449; Bursa, Ottoman Empire
- Burial: Hatuniye Camii, Muradiye Complex, Bursa
- Spouse: Mehmed I (m. 1403; died 1421)
- Issue: Murad II (?)
- Father: Mehmed of Dulkadir
- Mother: Hatice Hatun
- Religion: Sunni Islam

Emine Hatun (Ottoman Turkish: امینه خاتون; died in 1449) was a Dulkadirid princess and the legal wife of Sultan Mehmed I of the Ottoman Empire.

== Early life ==
Emine Hatun was born as a Dulkadirid princess, the daughter of Nasir al-Dīn Mehmed, fifth ruler of the Beylik of Dulkadir (reign 1399–1442) and his consort Hatice Hatun. Her niece Sittişah Hatun, daughter of her brother Zülkadiroğlu Süleyman Bey, married Mehmed II in 1449.

== Marriage ==
In 1403, when Mehmed had defeated his brother İsa Çelebi and İsfendiyar Bey, the ruler of the Isfendiyarids who had formed an alliance with each other, he returned to Rum, and decided to make some alliances of his own. While he was feasting in Tokat, Karamanid ruler Mehmed Bey sent his head military judge, and ambassadors also arrived from the realm of Dulkadirids. Relations were mended and animosity was removed. Peace and friendship were then established between them. At that time, gifts and tokens of betrothal were sent to Emine Hatun, who was thus engaged to the Sultan. Mehmed Çelebi's important marriage alliance with the ruler of the neighboring tribal confederation of Dulkadir, which was especially rich in horses and horsemen, demonstrates his continued emphasis on tribal politics. The alliance proved of great value for Nasireddin Mehmed Bey. This not only gave Mehmed armed assistance in his campaign for the empire, but also ensured that the Dulkadirids were always ready to attack the eastern provinces of the Karamanid principality.

== Dispute over being Murad II's mother ==
The identity of Sultan Murad II's mother is disputed. According to historians İsmail Hami Danişmend, and Heath W. Lowry, his mother was Emine Hatun. However, according to 15th-century historian Şükrullah, Murad's mother was a concubine. Hüseyin Hüsâmeddin Yasar, an early 20th-century historian, wrote in his work Amasya Tarihi, that his mother was Şahzade Hatun, daughter of Divitdar Ahmed Pasha.

== See also ==
- Ottoman Empire
- Ottoman dynasty
- Ottoman family tree
- Line of succession to the Ottoman throne
- List of valide sultans
- List of the mothers of the Ottoman Sultans
- List of consorts of the Ottoman Sultans
- Ottoman Emperors family tree (simplified)

== Sources ==
- Kastritsis, Dimitris J. (2007). The Sons of Bayezid: Empire Building and Representation in the Ottoman Civil War of 1402-1413. BRILL. ISBN 978-9-004-15836-8.
- Lambton, Ann K. S. (1988). Continuity and Change in Medieval Persia. SUNY Press. ISBN 978-0-88706-133-2.
- Öztürk, Necdet (30 January 2014). Osmanlı Sosyal Hayatı. Işık Yayıncılık Ticaret. ISBN 978-6-055-12912-5.
- Pitcher, Donald Edgar (1968). An Historical Geography of the Ottoman Empire: From Earliest Times to the End of the Sixteenth Century. Brill Archive. ISBN 978-9-004-07929-8.
- Sakaoğlu, Necdet (2008). Bu mülkün kadın sultanları: Vâlide sultanlar, hâtunlar, hasekiler, kadınefendiler, sultanefendiler. Oğlak Yayıncılık. ISBN 978-9-753-29623-6.
- Uluçay, Mustafa Çağatay (2011). Padişahların kadınları ve kızları. Ankara: Ötüken. ISBN 978-9-754-37840-5.
- Türk dünyası araştırmaları, Issues 136-138. Türk Dünyası Araştırmaları Vakfı. 2002.
