= Hatice Halime Hatun =

Consort of Sultan Murad II

- Seyyidetü’n-Nisa; Tacü’n-Nisa; Sultan Hatun
- Born: c. 1410; Kastamonu, Beylik of Candar
- Died: after 1451; Bursa, Ottoman Empire
- Spouse: Murad II
- Issue: Şehzade İsfendiyar; Şehzade Ahmed
Names
- English: Tacünnisa Hatice Halime Sultan Hatun; Ottoman Turkish: تاج النساء خديجة حليمة سلطان خاتون
- House: Candar (by birth); Osman (by marriage)
- Father: İbrahim Bey
- Religion: Sunni Islam

Tacünnisa Hatice Halime Sultan Hatun (Ottoman Turkish: خديجة حليمة خاتون; c. 1410 - after 1451), also known as Alime Hatun or Sultan Hatun, was a princess of the House of Candar as daughter of İbrahim Bey, ruler of the Beylik of Candar. She was a consort of Sultan Murad II of the Ottoman Empire.

== Biography ==
Born Tacünnisa Hatice Halime Sultan Hatun of the princely House of Candar, she was the granddaughter of Isfendiyâr, eighth bey of the Candar Beylik.

When Murad II, the Ottoman sultan, sided against Isfendiyar and alongside his rebellious son Kıvameddin Kazım Bey, to whom he betrothed one of his sisters, Fatma Sultan Hatun, Isfendiyar offered Murad peace and proposed to seal the deal with a double marriage. Murad accepted and in 1425, in Edirne, he married Isfendiyar's daughter, Halime Hatun, while another of Murad's sisters, Selçuk Hatun, married Tâceddin Ibrâhim II Bey, Isfendiyar's son and heir. In the same year, Halime bore Murad a son, Şehzade Isfendiyar, who died as newborn.

With this dynastic union between the two houses, Murad II established an alliance with a powerful tribe against his most formidable enemy in Anatolia, the Beylik of Karaman, who had blocked his eastward expansion. The good relations between the two were preserved during the reign of the next sultan, Mehmed II, who endowed members of the Candar dynasty with mülks (land grants) in the region of Plovdiv and Didymoteicho, which were later transformed into waqfs.

Hatice Halime Hatun was known as Murad’s favorite consort. In 1435, Murad married Mara Branković. The rivalry between the two consorts initially worked against Halime, who was expelled from the court and sent to Bursa. However, sometime between the autumn of 1436 and the spring of 1437, Murad sent Mara to Bursa instead and recalled Halime.

== Death ==
Hatice Halime died in Bursa in 1440.

== After her death ==
A few years after Halime's death, Murad II married her niece Hatice Hatun, daughter of Halime's brother Tâceddin Ibrâhim II. In May 1450, Hatice bore Murad's last child, a son, Şehzade Ahmed, nicknamed Küçük Ahmed ("Ahmed the Younger") to distinguish him from his eponymous older half-brother, Büyük Ahmed ("Ahmed the Elder").

Murad died on February 1451, and his son Mehmed II, born by of Hüma Hatun, assumed the throne. At the time, Murad's only other son alive was the newborn Ahmed of nine months. The succession, not regulated by a precise law, had always been a source of dispute within the Ottoman dynasty which had previously been the cause civil wars and as such, Mehmed decided to eliminate every risk by executing his newborn half-brother. Following his accession, on 18 February, he summoned Hatice to the throne room and, while she and his father Murad's consorts and concubines congratulated him on his accession and offered their condolences on his father's death, Mehmed sent Ali Bey, son of Gazi Evrenos, to Hatice's chambers with orders to either strangle or drown the child. Subsequently, Mehmed legitimized the act by issuing the Law of Fraticide, which until the end of the 17th century granted the sultan the power to execute, at his discretion, any male relative in line of succession to the throne.

Later, Mehmed forced Hatice to marry Ishak Pasha, one of his father's officials and the new Beylerbey of Anatolia. The two had eight children, five sons named Halil Bey, Şadi Bey, Mustafa Çelebi, Piri Çelebi, and Ibrahim Bey, and three daughters named Hafsa Hatun, Fahrünnisa Hatun, and Şahzade Hatun.

== Issue ==
By Murad II, she had a son and a daughter:

- Şehzade Isfendiyar (1425–1425)
- Hafsa Hatun (1426-after 1480)

== Popular culture ==
Portrayed by Emine Ün in series Mehmed: Fetihler Sultanı (2024).

== Sources ==
- Babinger, Franz (1992). Mehmed the Conqueror and His Time. Princeton University Press. ISBN 978-0-691-01078-6.
- Bey, Mehmet Süreyya (1969). Osmanlı devletinde kim kimdi, Volume 1.
- Crowley, Roger (August 6, 2009). Constantinople: The Last Great Siege, 1453. Faber & Faber. ISBN 978-0-571-25079-0.
- Freely, John (February 28, 2009). The Grand Turk: Sultan Mehmet II - Conqueror of Constantinople, Master of an Empire and Lord of Two Seas. I.B.Tauris. ISBN 978-0-857-73022-0.
- Jefferson, John (August 17, 2012). The Holy Wars of King Wladislas and Sultan Murad: The Ottoman-Christian Conflict from 1438-1444. BRILL. ISBN 978-9-004-21904-5.
- Narodna biblioteka "Sv. sv. Kiril i Metodiĭ. Orientalski otdel, International Centre for Minority Studies and Intercultural Relations, Research Centre for Islamic History, Art, and Culture (2003). Inventory of Ottoman Turkish documents about Waqf preserved in the Oriental Department at the St. St. Cyril and Methodius National Library: Registers. Narodna biblioteka "Sv. sv. Kiril i Metodiĭ.
- Runciman, Steven (March 26, 2012). The Fall of Constantinople 1453. Cambridge University Press. ISBN 978-1-107-60469-8.
- Sakaoğlu, Necdet (2007). Famous Ottoman women. Avea.
- Sakaoğlu, Necdet (2008). Bu mülkün kadın sultanları: Vâlide sultanlar, hâtunlar, hasekiler, kadınefendiler, sultanefendiler. Oğlak Yayıncılık. ISBN 978-9-753-29623-6.
- Thatcher, Bruce D. (June 25, 2011). Adamant Aggressors: How to Recognize and Deal with Them. Xlibris Corporation. ISBN 978-1-462-89195-5.
- Uluçay, M. Çağatay (2011). Padişahların kadınları ve kızları. Ötüken. ISBN 978-9-754-37840-5.
