= Battle of Bolu =

Battle of Bolu (1423)
- Part of the Ottoman wars in Asia
Date	1423
Location	Bolu
Result	Ottoman victory

Belligerents
Ottoman Empire	Candarids

Commanders and leaders
(Ottoman Empire) Murad II	İsfendiyar Bey (WIA)

Strength
Unknown	Unknown

Casualties and losses
Unknown	Unknown

The Battle of Bolu, was a military clash in 1423 in which the Ottoman army under the command of Murad II defeated the Candar army under the command of İsfendiyar Bey, which was besieging Safranbolu.

== Background ==
While Murad II was dealing with the Mustafa Çelebi rebellion since his accession to the throne (1421), some of the Anatolian principalities took action by taking advantage of these internal turmoils of the Ottoman State. In this context, the Germiyanids and Menteshe principalities of Murad II. While not recognizing the sultanate of Murad, the principalities of Karamanids, Aydinids and Sarukhanids also recaptured some of their former lands from the Ottoman Empire.

The Bey of Candar dynasty, İsfendiyar Bey, also took advantage of this opportunity and took Tosya, Çankırı and Kalecik from the Ottomans, as well as besieging Safranbolu (Taraklı Borlu). Simultaneously, Eflak, an ally of Candar dynasty, was attacked by Silistra.

== Battle ==
The Mustafa Çelebi rebellion was suppressed (Mustafa Çelebi was executed on February 20, 1423.) Mustafa II, setting out from İznik, taking Kasım Bey, who had taken refuge with him when the Ottoman army reached Yenişehir, He marched against the Candar dynasty army that was besieging Taraklı Borlu. Murad II, gave soldiers to Kasım Bey's command and sent them to the battlefield. Seeing Kasım Bey on the opposing side, a part of the Candar army separated from the army and crossed to the opposite side. Between Bolu and Gered or near Safranbolu as a result of the battle between the two armies, the Ottoman army inflicted a decisive defeat on the Candar army Mubariz al-Din Isfendiyar, who was wounded in the head, also took refuge in the Sinop castle.

== Aftermath ==
Murad II, while returning to his capital after the victory, gave some Ottoman troops the task of following the retreating Candar troops. The Ottoman troops, who continued their forward operation, occupied Küre. Thereupon, Mubariz al-Din Isfendiyar sent his son Murad and wanted to make peace.
