= Battle of Thessalonica (1416) =

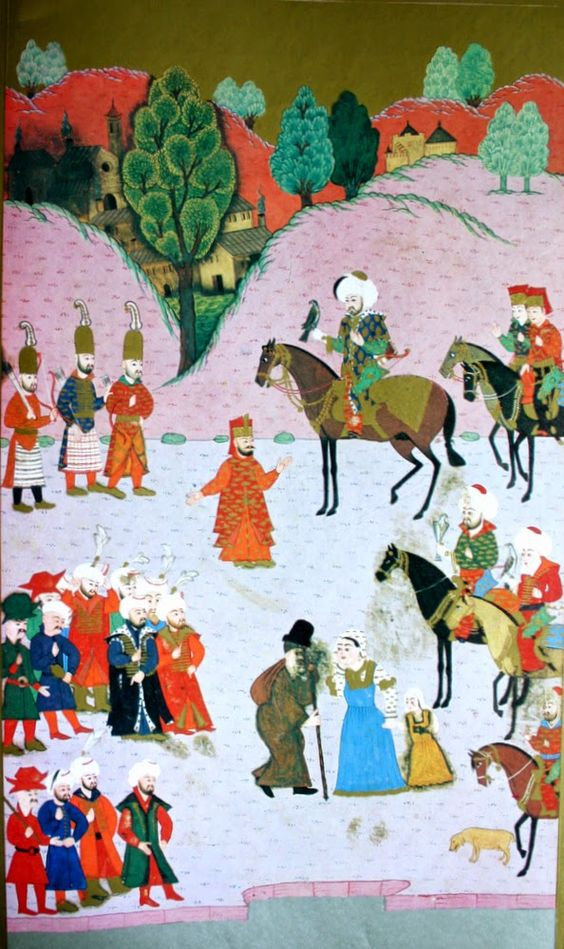
- Mehmed I hunting in the Danube River.
Date	1416
Location	Thessaloniki, Greece
Result	Victory for Mehmed I

Belligerents
Ottoman Empire	(Ottoman Empire) Forces of Mustafa Çelebi supported by: Principality of Wallachia; Byzantine Empire

Commanders and leaders
(Ottoman Empire) Mehmed I (Ottoman Empire) Şehzade Murad	(Ottoman Empire) Mustafa Çelebi; Junayd Bey

Strength
60,000 men	40,000 men

Casualties and losses
Unknown	Heavy

The Battle of Thessalonica was the battle that took place during Mustafa Çelebi's first rebellion.

== Background ==
Recent studies confirm that Mustafa Çelebi—referred to by Ottoman historians as “Düzmece Mustafa,” “Düzme Mustafa,” or “False Mustafa”—was in fact the son of Bayezid I who was captured at the Battle of Ankara. It appears that Ottoman historians portrayed Mustafa Çelebi as an impostor in order to preserve the authority of Mehmed I, who had secured the throne, and later that of his son Murad. According to Ottoman chronicles, Mustafa Çelebi disappeared during the Battle of Ankara, after which Timur took him to Samarkand. Following Timur's death, he was released. After regaining his freedom, he came to Anatolia and stayed there for a time before moving on to the Balkans.

== Battle ==
Cüneyd Bey, who had been dismissed by Mehmed I and reassigned to the sanjak of Nicopolis, joined Mustafa Çelebi after the latter crossed into Wallachia. There, both Cüneyd Bey and Mustafa Çelebi received military support from Mircea.(Spring 1416)

Later on, the followers of Sheikh Bedreddin—who could not be completely suppressed—also gathered around Mustafa and his supporters. The army, which continued to grow in Bulgaria, Epirus, and Greece, reached 40,000 men. Mustafa and his companions formulated the following plan: they would set out from Thessaloniki and seize Thrace. Then, by cooperating with the Byzantines and making use of Byzantine ships, they would cross into Anatolia, where they intended to topple Mehmed I from the Ottoman throne in Bursa.

However, Cüneyd Bey's plan was quickly thwarted by Mehmed I. He sent an army of 60,000 men from Bursa to Gallipoli, composed of forces that had served with distinction under his son Murad during the İzmir and Balkan uprisings. The troops of Mustafa Çelebi, who had taken position around Thessaloniki, were utterly defeated by this army. Knowing the punishment they would face if captured, they remained on their swift horses throughout the battle, staying beyond the range of arrows and ready to flee at any moment. Realizing that their forces were beginning to collapse, they immediately withdrew into the fortress of Thessaloniki, where they were received by Demetrios Laskaris Leontares.

== After ==
The next morning, Çelebi Mehmed demanded that they be handed over by the governor of the city, but the Governor of Thessaloniki, Demetrios Laskaris, replied that he could not surrender them without the emperor's permission. Emperor Manuel swore that he would not release them as long as Çelebi Mehmed lived, and upon this assurance, the siege of Thessaloniki was lifted. In the agreement made with the Byzantine emperor on this matter, Çelebi Mehmed agreed to pay 300,000 akçe annually for Mustafa Çelebi.

After Mehmed I had put an end to Mustafa's troubles, he ordered raids on the Wallachian Prince who had helped him.
