= Siege of Samsun =

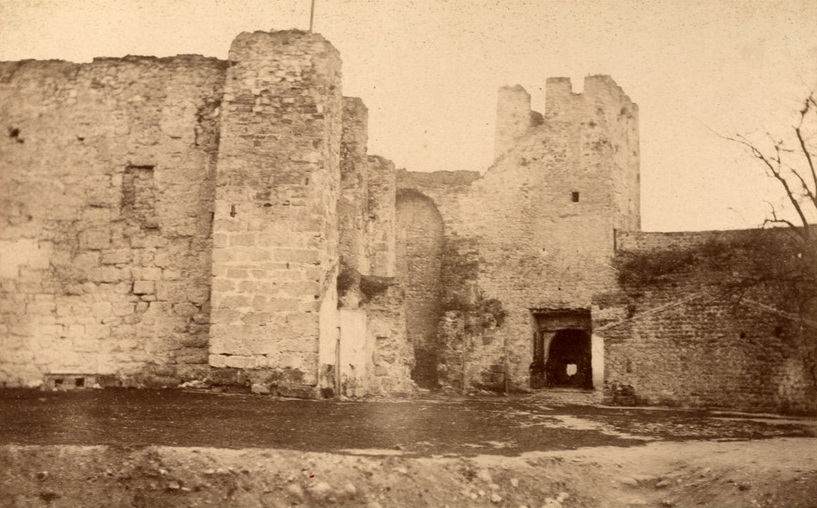
- Samsun Castle
| Date | 1420 |
| Location | Samsun, Turkey |
| Result | Ottoman victory |

Belligerents
| Ottoman Empire | Candarids; Supported by: Republic of Genoa |

Commanders and leaders
| (Ottoman Empire) Mehmed I (Ottoman Empire) Şehzade Murad (Ottoman Empire) Hamza Bey | Hızır Bey (surrendered) |

The Siege of Samsun was a campaign organized by the Ottomans against the Genoese and Candarids.

== Background ==
After the Battle of Ankara, Kubadoğlu Cüneyt Bey retook Samsun, which had been his former domain. However, Cüneyt Bey was unable to hold the city for long; he was killed by Taceddinoğlu Hasan Bey, and the city was subsequently occupied by the Candarids. İsfendiyar Bey then granted Samsun to his younger son, Hızır.

In 1403, the Catalan envoy Ruy González de Clavijo, who passed through Samsun, noted that there were two fortresses there—one inhabited by the Turks and the other by the Genoese. The Ottomans referred to the fortress inhabited by the Turks as “Muslim Samsun,” and the one held by the Genoese as “Infidel Samsun.”

== Battle ==
When Sultan Mehmed I learned about the change of power in Samsun, he gathered his army and moved toward Tokat. Taking Prince Murad and his tutor Hamza Bey in Amasya with him, he headed toward Samsun. Sultan Mehmed sent Hamza Bey as the vanguard to attack Infidel Samsun while he followed from behind. Hamza Bey besieged the castle held by the Genoese, but when the colony realized they could not resist, they set the city on fire and abandoned the castle along with their ships. Afterwards, Hamza Bey advanced on Muslim Samsun and began besieging Hızır Bey there. Sultan Mehmed also arrived in front of Samsun Castle. Seeing the Sultan's arrival, Hızır Bey surrendered and handed the keys of the castle to Mehmed I.
