= Serdar Gökhan =

Turkish actor

- Born: Nusret Ersöz; 15 March 1943 (age 83); Mudurnu, Bolu, Turkey
- Occupation: Actor
- Years active: 1966–present

Serdar Gökhan (born Nusret Ersöz; 15 March 1943) is a Turkish actor.

== Biography ==
Serdar Gökhan is an actor, known for Killing the Shadows (2006), The Executioner (1975) and Malkoçoğlu, the Wolf Master (1972).

== Filmography ==
- Mehmed: Fetihler Sultanı (2024–2026) as Evrenosoğlu Ali Bey
- Kuruluş: Osman (2019, cameo)
- Türkler Geliyor: Adaletin Kılıcı (2020)
- Diriliş: Ertuğrul (2014) (season 1)
- Kurt Seyit ve Şura (2014)
- Babalar ve Evlatlar - season 1 (2012)
- Fatmagül'ün Suçu Ne? - season 2 (2011)
- Kırmızı Işık - season 1 (2008)
- Elif - Season 1 (2008)
- Hacivat Karagöz Neden Öldürüldü? (2006)
- Pertev Bey'in Üç Kızı - season 1 (2006)
- Sev Kardeşim - season 1 (2006)
- Karaoğlan - season 1 (2002)
- Akşam Güneşi - season 1 (1999)
- Kanayan Yara - Bosna Mavi Karanlık (1994)
- Kurdoğlu 3 - Bu Yola Baş Koyduk (1992)
- Ahmet Hamdi Bey Ailesi - season 1 (1991)
- Polis Görev Başında (1990)
- Av (1989)
- Kanun Savaşçıları (1989)
- Utanç Yılları (1987)
- Yeniden Doğmak - season 1 (1987)
- Namusun Bedeli (1986)
- Altın Kafes (1982)
- Yıkılış (1978)
- Meryem Ve Oğulları (1977)
- Mavi Mercedes (1977)
- Şeref Yumruğu (1977)
- Yuvanın Bekçileri (1977)
- Analar Ölmez (1976)
- Kan Kardeşler (1976)
- Ölüme Yalnız Gidilir (1976)
- Selam Dostum (1976)
- Sevdalılar (1976)
- Acı Severim Tatlı Döverim (1975)
- Bu Osman Başka Osman (1975)
- Cellat (1975)
- Hesap Günü (1975)
- Intihar (1975)
- Isyan (1975)
- Macera (1975)
- Namıdiğer Çolak (1975)
- Turhanoğlu (1975)
- Yatık Emine (1974)
- Bir Damla Kan Uğruna (1974)
- Deli Ferhat (1974)
- Dövüşe Dövüşe Öldüler (1974)
- Karanlık Yıllar (1974)
- Silahın Elinde Kardeş (1974)
- Unutma Beni (1974)
- Vur Be Ramazan (1974)
- Beklenmeyen Adam (1973)
- Dağ Kanunu (1973)
- Hudutların Kartalı (1973)
- İkibin Yılın Sevgilisi (1973)
- İnsanlık Ölmedikçe (1973)
- Kara Orkun (1973)
- Kara Pençe'nin İntikamı (1973)
- Kara Pençe (1973)
- Kır çiçeği (1973)
- Kurt Yemini (1973)
- Soğukkanlılar (1973)
- Gurbetçiler (1973)
- Vur Emri (1973)
- Malkoçoğlu Kurt Bey (1972)
- Acı Yudum (1972)
- Akma Tuna (1972)
- Dudaktan Dudağa Ölüm (1972)
- Estergon Kalesi (1972)
- Gökçeçiçek (1972)
- Irmak (1972)
- Istanbul Kabadayısı Kara Murat (1972)
- Kara Doğan (1972)
- Kurt Bey (1972)
- Asya'nın Tek Atlısı Baybars (1971)
- Kadırgalı Ali (1971)
