= Mehmed I =

Sultan of the Ottoman Empire from 1413 to 1421

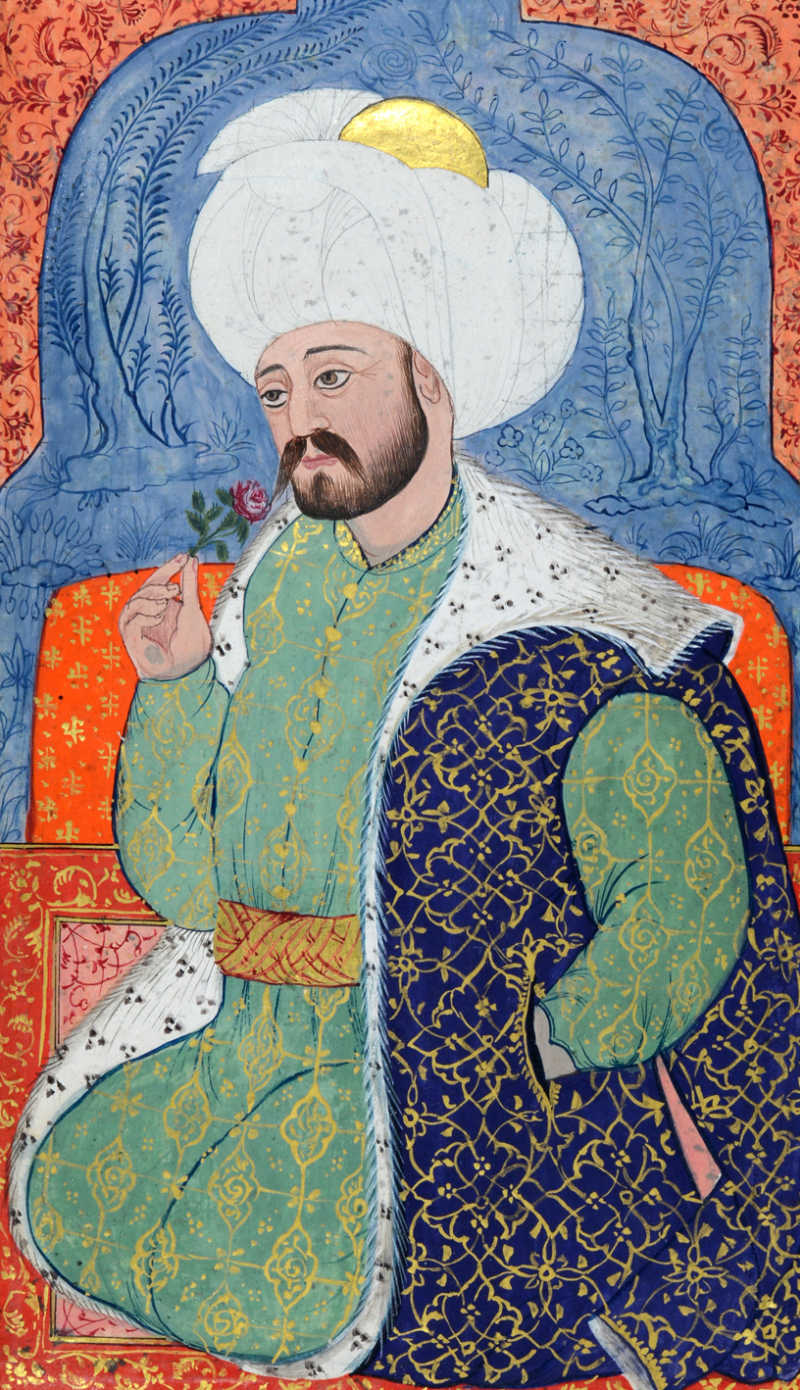
- Miniature of Mehmed I from a 16th century manuscript

Sultan of the Ottoman Empire (Padishah)
- Reign: 5 July 1413 – 26 May 1421
- Predecessor: Interregnum (1402–1413); Bayezid I
- Successor: Murad II
- Contenders: See list: Süleyman Çelebi (1402–1411); İsa Çelebi (1403); Musa Çelebi (1411–1413); Mustafa Çelebi (1419–1421)

Sultan of Anatolia
- Reign: 1403 – 5 July 1413
- Born: c. 1386; Bursa, Ottoman Sultanate
- Died: 26 May 1421 (aged 34–35); Bursa, Ottoman Sultanate
- Burial: Green Tomb, Bursa, Turkey
- Consorts: Emine Hatun; Şahzade Hatun; Kumru Hatun; Dilfiruz Hatun
- Issue Among others: Murad II; Selçuk Hatun; Mustafa Çelebi
Names
- Meḥemmed bin Bāyezīd Ḫān
- Dynasty: Ottoman
- Father: Bayezid I
- Mother: Devlet Hatun
- Religion: Sunni Islam
- Tughra
- Military career
- Conflicts: See list: Battle of Ankara; Ottoman Interregnum; Struggle with İsa; Battle of Ulubad; Battles of Armenian-beli; Capture of Bursa; Battle of Karesi; Struggle with Suleiman; Struggle with Musa; Battle of İnceğiz; Battle of Vize; Battle of Çamurlu; Conquest of Dobruja; Hungarian–Ottoman War (1415–1419); Battle of Thessalonica (1416); Wallachian campaign (1420); Campaign in Albanian; Conquest of Cilicia; Conquest of Candar dynasty; Struggle with Mustafa; Campaign in Anatolia (Mehmed I); Campaign in Aydinids; Capture of İzmir; Campaign in Menteshe; Capture of Eğridir; Capture of Akşehir; Capture of Beyşehir; Campaign in Karamanids (1414); Battle of Konya Plain; Siege of Konya; Campaign in Teke (Beylik); Siege of Samsun; Capture of Sarukhanids

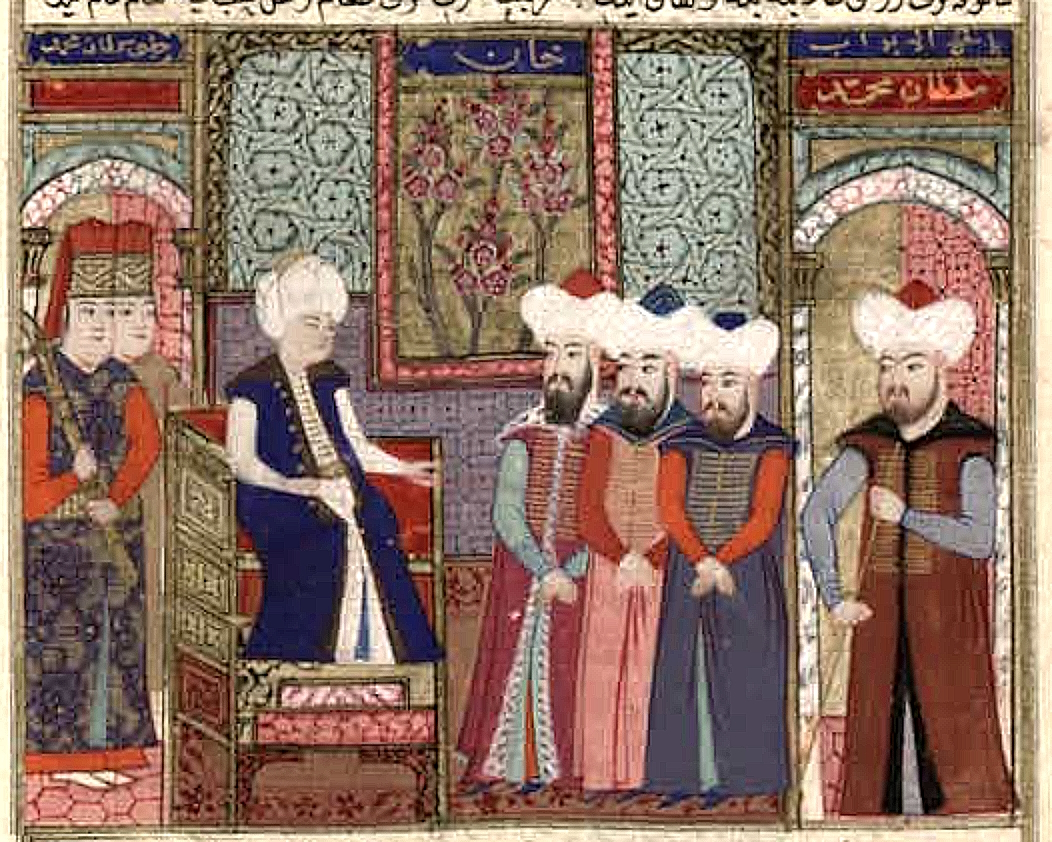
Mehmed I with his dignitaries. Ottoman miniature painting, kept at Istanbul University.

Mehmed I (Turkish: I. Mehmed; c. 1386/87 – 26 May 1421), also known as Mehmed Çelebi (Ottoman Turkish: چلبی محمد, "the noble-born") or Kirişçi (Greek: Κυριτζής, romanized: Kyritzis, "lord's son"), was the sultan of the Ottoman Empire from 1413 to 1421. Son of Sultan Bayezid I and his concubine Devlet Hatun, he fought with his brothers over control of the Ottoman realm in the Ottoman Interregnum (1402–1413). Starting from the province of Rûm he managed to bring first Anatolia and then the European territories (Rumelia) under his control, reuniting the Ottoman state by 1413, and ruling it until his death in 1421. Called Bânî-i Sânî (Ottoman Turkish: بانی ثانی, "Second Founder"), he reestablished central authority in Anatolia, and he expanded the Ottoman presence in Europe through the conquest of Dobruja in 1419. Venice destroyed his fleet off Gallipoli in 1416 when the Ottomans lost a naval war.

== Early life ==
Mehmed was born in 1386 or 1387 as the fourth son of Sultan Bayezid I (r. 1389–1402) and one of his consorts, the slave girl Devlet Hatun. Following Ottoman custom, when he reached adolescence in 1399, he was sent to gain experience as provincial governor over the Rûm Eyalet (central northern Anatolia), recently conquered from its Eretnid rulers.

On 20 July 1402, his father Bayezid was defeated in the Battle of Ankara by the Turko-Mongol conqueror and ruler Timur. The brothers (with the exception of Mustafa, who was captured and taken along with Bayezid to Samarkand) were rescued from the battlefield, Mehmed being saved by Bayezid Pasha, who took him to his hometown of Amasya. Mehmed later made Bayezid Pasha his grand vizier (1413–1421).

The early Ottoman Empire had no regulated succession, and according to Turkish tradition, every son could succeed his father. Of Mehmed's brothers, the eldest, Ertuğrul, had died in 1400, while the next in line, Mustafa, was a prisoner of Timur. Leaving aside the underage siblings, this left four princes—Mehmed, Süleyman, İsa, and Musa, to contend over control of the remaining Ottoman territories in the civil war known as the "Ottoman Interregnum". In modern historiography, these princes are usually called by the title Çelebi, but in contemporary sources, the title is reserved for Mehmed and Musa. The Byzantine sources translated the title as Kyritzes (Κυριτζής), which was in turn adopted into Turkish as kirişçi, sometimes misinterpreted as güreşçi, 'the wrestler'.

During the early interregnum, Mehmed Çelebi behaved as Timur's vassal. Beside the other princes, Mehmed minted coin which Timur's name appeared as Demur Han Gürgân (تيمور خان كركان), alongside his own as Mehmed bin Bayezid Han (محمد بن بايزيد خان). This was probably an attempt on Mehmed's part to justify to Timur his conquest of Bursa after the Battle of Ulubad. After Mehmed established himself in Rum, Timur had already begun preparations for his return to Central Asia, and took no further steps to interfere with the status quo in Anatolia.

== Reign ==
After winning the Interregnum, Mehmed crowned himself sultan in the Thracian city of Edirne that lay in the European part of the empire (the area dividing the Anatolian and European sides of the empire, Constantinople and the surrounding region, was still held by the Byzantine Empire), becoming Mehmed I. He consolidated his power, made Edirne the most important of the dual capitals, and conquered parts of Albania, the Jandarid emirate, and the Armenian Kingdom of Cilicia from the Mamluks. Taking his many achievements into consideration, Mehmed is widely known as the "second founder" of the Ottoman Sultanate.

Soon after Mehmed began his reign, his brother Mustafa Çelebi, who had originally been captured along with their father Bayezid I during the Battle of Ankara and held captive in Samarkand, hiding in Anatolia during the Interregnum, reemerged and asked Mehmed to partition the empire with him. Mehmed refused and met Mustafa's forces in battle, easily defeating them. Mustafa escaped to the Byzantine city of Thessaloniki, but after an agreement with Mehmed, the Byzantine emperor Manuel II Palaiologos exiled Mustafa to the island of Lemnos.

However, Mehmed still faced some problems, first being the problem of his nephew Orhan, who Mehmed perceived as a threat to his rule, much like his late brothers had been. There was allegedly a plot involving him by Manuel II Palaiologos, who tried to use Orhan against Sultan Mehmed; however, the sultan found out about the plot and had Orhan blinded for betrayal, according to a common Byzantine practice.

Furthermore, as a result of the Battle of Ankara and other civil wars, the population of the empire had become unstable and traumatized. A very powerful social and religious movement arose in the empire and became disruptive. The movement was led by Sheikh Bedreddin (1359–1420), a famous Muslim Sufi and charismatic theologian. He was an eminent Ulema, born of a Greek mother and a Muslim father in Simavna (Kyprinos) southwest of Edirne (formerly Adrianople). Mehmed's brother Musa had made Bedreddin his "qadi of the army," or the supreme judge. Bedreddin created a populist religious movement in the Ottoman Sultanate, "subversive conclusions promoting the suppression of social differences between rich and poor as well as the barriers between different forms of monotheism." Successfully developing a popular social revolution and syncretism of the various religions and sects of the empire, Bedreddin's movement began in the European side of the empire and underwent further expansion in western Anatolia.

In 1416, Sheikh Bedreddin started his rebellion against the throne. After a four-year struggle, he was finally captured by Mehmed's grand vizier Bayezid Pasha and hanged in the city of Serres, a city in modern-day Greece, in 1420.

== Death ==
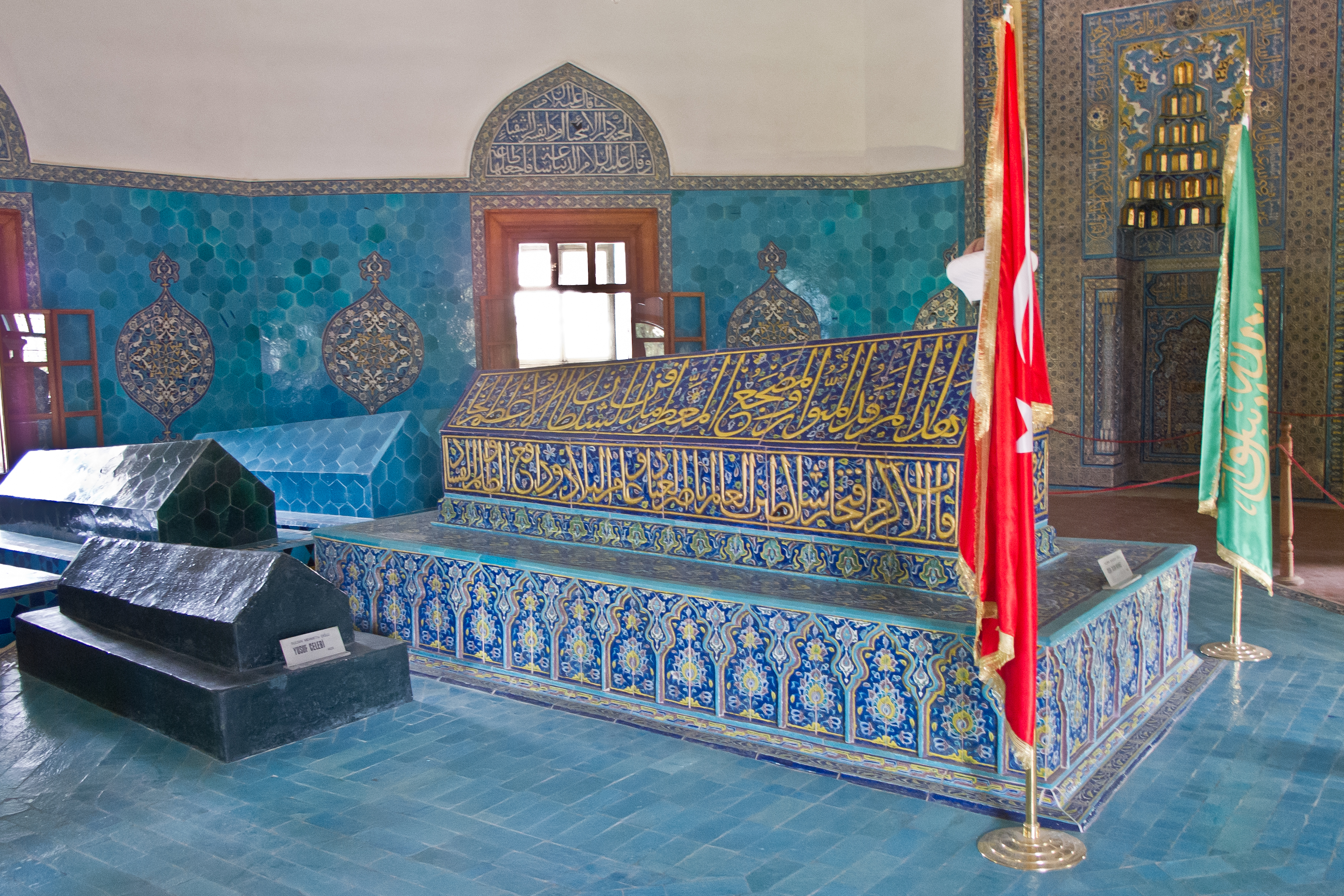
His mausoleum, Green Tomb, in Bursa

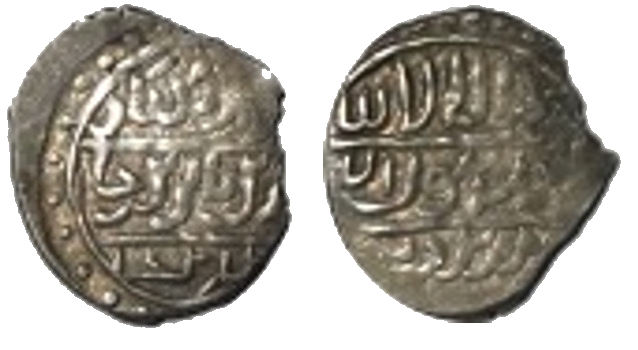
1404 AD dated akçe of Mehmed citing Timur as overlord

The reign of Mehmed I as sultan of the re-united empire lasted only eight years before his death, but he had also been the most powerful brother contending for the throne and de facto ruler of most of the empire for nearly the whole preceding period of 11 years of the Ottoman Interregnum that passed between his father's captivity at Ankara and his own final victory over his brother Musa Çelebi at the Battle of Çamurlu.

Before his death, to secure passing the throne safely to his son Murad II, Mehmed blinded his nephew Orhan Çelebi (son of Süleyman), and decided to send his two sons Yusuf and Mahmud to be held as a hostage by Emperor Manuel II, hoping to ensure the continuing custody of his brother Mustafa and to also protect his 2 younger sons from execution from their brother.

He was buried in Bursa, in a mausoleum erected by himself near the celebrated mosque which he built there, and which, because of its decorations of green glazed tiles, is called the Green Mosque. Mehmed I also completed another mosque in Bursa, which his grandfather Murad I had commenced but which had been neglected during the reign of Bayezid. Mehmed founded in the vicinity of his own Green Mosque and mausoleum two other characteristic institutions, one a school and one a refectory for the poor, both of which he endowed with royal munificence.

== Family ==
=== Consorts ===
Mehmed I had four known consorts:

- Emine Hatun, daughter of Nasireddin Mehmed Bey, fifth ruler of Dulkadirids. She married Mehmed in 1403 and was the mother of Murad II.
- Şahzade Hatun, daughter of Dividdar Ahmed Pasha, third ruler of Kutluşah of Canik.
- Kumru Hatun, slave concubine.
- Dilfiruz Hatun, slave concubine.

=== Sons ===
Mehmed I had at least five sons:

- Murad II (1404–1451) - with Emine Hatun. Sultan of the Ottoman Empire.
- Mustafa Çelebi, known as Küçük Mustafa (1408–1423). He disputed the throne with Murad II, by whom he was defeated and executed.
- Mahmud Çelebi (1413 - August 1429. Buried in the mausoleum's Mehmed I, Bursa)
- Yusuf Çelebi (1414 - August 1429. Buried in the mausoleum's Mehmed I, Bursa)
- Ahmed Çelebi. Died in infancy.

=== Daughters ===
Mehmed I had at least eight daughters:

- Selçuk Hatun (c. 1407 - 25 October 1485, buried in Mehmed I Mausoleum, Bursa) - with Kumru Hatun. She married Taceddin Ibrahim II Bey, ruler of Isfendiyarids (1392 – 30 May 1443), son of İsfendiyar Bey. They had three sons and three daughters, all died in infancy except a daughter, Hatice Hanzade Hatun. After widowed, she married Anadolu Beylerbeyi Karaca. They had a daughter, who died young.
- Ilaldi Sultan Hatun (1412 - 1444). In 1425 she married Ibrahim II Bey, ruler of Karamanids (died 16 July 1464), son of Mehmed II Bey (son of Nefise Hatun, a Murad I's daughter), and had six sons, amongs them Piri Ahmed Bey, Kasim Bey, Kaya Bey (who married his cousin Hafsa Hatun, daughter of Murad II) and Alaeddin Bey; but the marriage was unhappy and her husband hated her and their sons because their Ottoman blood.
- Hatice Hatun (1408–1442). She married Karaca Pasha (died on 10 November 1444).
- Hafsa Hatun (? - 1445, buried in Mehmed I Mausoleum, Bursa). She married Mahmud Bey (died in January 1444), son of Çandarlı Halil Pasha. By him she had six sons and a daughter.
- Incu Hatun. In 1427 she married Isa Bey (died in 1437), son of Mehmed II Bey.
- Ayşe Sultan Hatun (1412–1469, buried in Mehmed I Mausoleum, Bursa). In 1427 she married Alaeddin Ali Bey, ruler of Karamanids, son of Mehmed II Bey.
- Şahzade Sitti Hatun (1413– ?, buried in Mehmed I Mausoleum, Bursa). In 1427 she married Sinan Pasha (died in 1442).
- Fatma Sultan Hatun. She married Kıvameddin Kazim Bey, son of Isfendyar Bey and brother of Selçuk's husband Ibrahim II Bey.

== Sources ==
- İnalcık, Halil (1991). "Meḥemmed I". The Encyclopedia of Islam, New Edition, Volume VI: Mahk–Mid. Leiden and New York: BRILL. pp. 973–978. ISBN 90-04-08112-7.
- Creasy, Sir Edward Shepherd (1878). History of the Ottoman Turks, from the beginning of their empire to the present time. New York: Holt.
- Kastritsis, Dimitris (2007). The Sons of Bayezid: Empire Building and Representation in the Ottoman Civil War of 1402-13. BRILL. ISBN 978-90-04-15836-8.

Mehmed I House of Osman Born: 1386 Died: 26 May 1421
Regnal titles
Preceded by Bayezid I	Ottoman Sultan; 5 July 1413 – 26 May 1421	Succeeded by Murad II
