= Leyla Feray =

Turkish actress (born 1993)

- Born: 8 May 1993 (age 33); Istanbul, Turkey
- Education: Koç University School of Media and Fine Arts
- Occupation: Actress
- Years active: 2013–present
- Partner: Serhat Teoman

Leyla Feray (born 8 May 1993) is a Turkish film and television actress.

== Life and career ==
Feray was born in Istanbul. She is a graduate of Koç University School of Media and Fine Arts. She made her acting debut in 2013 with a supporting role in the series Ben Onu Çok Sevdim. She continued her television career by appearing in Paşa Gönlüm as Türkan and in Üç Arkadaş as Gül Peri.

She rose to prominence with her portrayal of Ayşe Sultan in the historical drama series Muhteşem Yüzyıl: Kösem. She made her cinematic debut in 2017 with her role in Kardeşim Benim 2 opposite Burak Özçivit and Murat Boz. In 2020, she had a brief role as Hüma Hatun in the Netflix docuseries Rise of Empires: Ottoman, and she starred in the TRT1 historical drama series Uyanış: Büyük Selçuklu as Gevher Hatun.

== Filmography ==
Television
Year	Title	Role	Netwoek	Episode No.
2013	Ben Onu Çok Sevdim	Sinem	ATV	8 episodes
2014	Paşa Gönlüm	Türkan	Kanal D	3 episodes
2014	Üç Arkadaş	Gülperi Akseki	ATV	4 episodes
2016–2017	Muhteşem Yüzyıl: Kösem	Ayşe Sultan	Fox	15 episodes
2020–2021	Uyanış: Büyük Selçuklu	Gevher Hatun	TRT1	34 episodes
2021	İkimizin Sırrı	Neva Canpolat	ATV	10 episodes
2022	Camdaki Kız	Pera	Kanal D	
2026	Muhtemel Aşk	Kader Emindağ	Show TV	
Web series				
2020	Rise of Empires: Ottoman	Hüma Hatun	Netflix	1 episode

Film
Year	Title	Role	Director
2017	Kardeşim Benim 2	Leyla	Mert Baykal
Short film
2018	Aries	Leyla	Dila Bulut
