= Gülbahar Hatun (mother of Bayezid II) =

Valide Hatun of the Ottoman Empire (1481–1492)

- Valide-i macide Meliketü'l-Melikât; Tâcü'l-mükerremât; Fahrü'l-muazzamat; Fatihetü'l-maeyâmin ve'l hayrat Seyyidetü'l-muhadderât; Netîcetü'l-münevverât; Safiyyetü's-sıfât; Dâru'l-alâ ve's-sa'âdât

Valide Hatun of the Ottoman Empire
- Tenure: 3 May 1481 – 1492
- Predecessor: Emine Hatun or Hüma Hatun
- Successor: Hafsa Sultan (as Valide Sultan)
- Born: Unknown
- Died: 1492; Constantinople, Ottoman Empire (present day Istanbul, Turkey)
- Burial: Fatih Mosque, Istanbul
- Consort of: Mehmed II
- Issue: Gevherhan Hatun; Bayezid II
- House: Ottoman
- Religion: Sunni Islam (converted)

Gülbahar Hatun(Ottoman Turkish: گل بہار خاتون; died in 1492) was a concubine of Ottoman Sultan Mehmed II, and mother and Valide Hatun of Sultan Bayezid II.

== Early life ==
The Ottoman inscription (vakfiye) describes her as Hātun binti Abdullah (daughter of Abdullah), which means that she was a Christian slave converted to Islam. Various sources attribute, Albanian, Greek, Serbian or French origins to her, but contemporary ambassadors' reports, for example the Venetian Iacopo de Promontorio-de Campis' notes in 1475 report that Prince Bayezid's mother was an Albanian slave. The attribution of a Greek origin arose from the confusion with the homonymous Gülbahar Hatun mother of Selim I, who is believed to have been a Greek slave originally from Pontus. According to Shuteriqi, Gülbahar may have been a daughter of Gjergj Arianiti and Maria Muzaka, however this theory is not supported by modern historians. She was likely a Christian slave concubine who converted to Islam.

== Consort ==
Gülbahar entered in Mehmed's harem in 1446, when he was still a prince and the governor of Manisa. She had two children, a daughter, Gevherhan Hatun, born in 1446, who married Ughurlu Muhammad in 1474, and a son, Şehzade Bayezid (the future Bayezid II), born around in 1447–1448 in Demotika

In 1451, after Mehmed's accession to the throne, she followed him to Edirne. According to Ottoman tradition, all princes were expected to work as provincial governors as a part of their training. In 1455 or 1456, Bayezid was appointed the governor of Amasya, and Gülbahar accompanied him, where the two remained until 1481, except for in 1457, when she came to Edirne, and attended her son's circumcision ceremony.

Gülbahar was apparently quite concerned about the future of her son, and related to that, her own properties. In order to secure her properties, she endowed the incomes of certain villages and fields to the Enderun mosque in 1474. Among the endowed properties was the village of Ağılcık, which was turned back into a Timariot village in 1479 during the land reform.

According to surviving archival records, although Gülbahar Hatun was a consort of Mehmed II, she was no different from ordinary subjects before the law. The clearest example of this is that she was expected to provide “cebelü” (soldiers equipped for military service) in return for the lands granted to her by her husband in and around Amasya.

In 1468, Mehmed gave the village of Bağluca to Gülbahar. After six years, in 1473, she sold the village to Taceddin Bey, son of Hamza Bali (died 1486), the book keeper of Bayezid's court. In 1478, the village's exemption was abolished and granted back to her probably as a result of the land reform. This order was reissued a year later at the request of Mevlana Şemseddin Ahmed according to which the village was not reverted to her, and she had likely become subject to a legal dispute.

In addition, following Mehmed II's far-reaching land reform, an opposition group emerged against him. Large amounts of land that had unlawfully come into private hands or had been converted into wakf property were transferred back to the miri (state treasury). Şehzade Bayezid opposed this policy, and as a result, the opposition group that had lost its lands gradually began to rally around him in Amasya. Since Gülbahar Hatun was also in Amasya alongside her son during the period when Mehmed's opponents gathered around Şehzade Bayezid, it is understood that the sultan gradually adopted a negative attitude toward both mother and son.

== Valide Hatun ==
Per custom, Gülbahar got the highest position in the imperial family after the sultan himself when her son, Bayezid ascended the throne in 1481 until her death in 1492. During her son's reign, she and the rest of the Imperial Family resided at the Old Palace (Saray-ı Atik) and were visited by the Sultan who on each visit used to pay his respect to his mother. In one case, Gülbahar complained of her son's rare visits and in a letter to her son wrote:

"My fortune, I miss you. Even if you don't miss me, I miss you ... Come and let me see you. My dear lord, if you are going on campaign soon, come once or twice at least so that I may see your fortune-favored face before you go. It's been forty days since I last saw you. My sultan, please forgive my boldness. Who else do I have beside you ... ?"

Gülbahar had a considerable influence over Bayezid, for she used to make evaluations about the situation of some statesmen. Bayezid also valued his mother's words. In a letter written to him, she advises him against Hersekzade Ahmed Pasha, but favours his tutor Ayas Pasha and Hizirbeyoğlu Mehmed Pasha.

In 1485, Bayezid endowed a mosque, and a school in Tokat in the memory of Gülbahar Hatun.

== Death ==
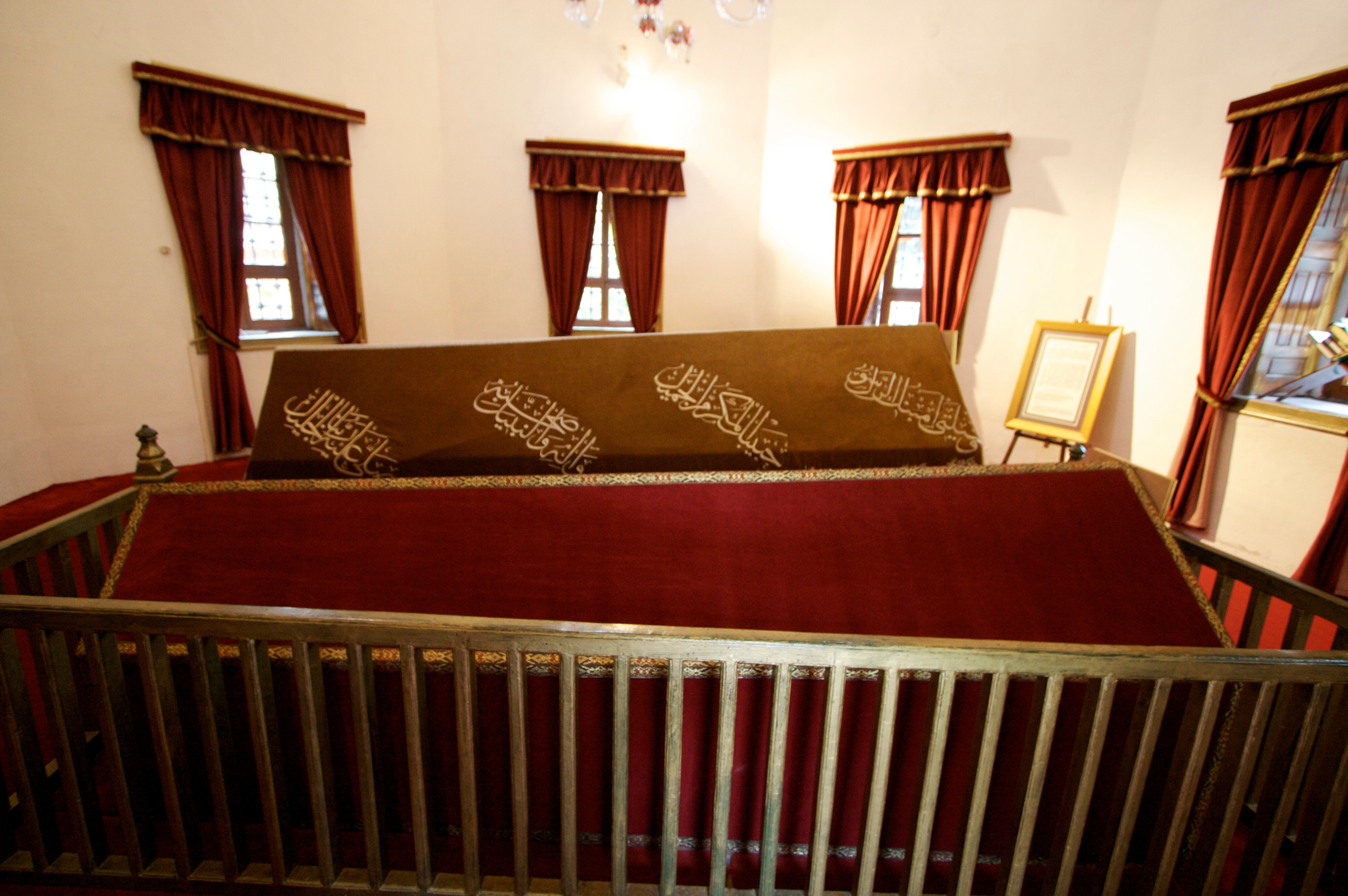
The interior appearance of the tomb in Gülbahar's mausoleum at the Fatih Mosque, Istanbul

Gülbahar Hatun died in 1492, and was buried in Fatih Mosque, Istanbul. The tomb was damaged in the 1766 Istanbul earthquake, and was rebuilt in 1767–1768.

== Issue ==
By Mehmed II, Gülbahar Hatun had a daughter, and a son:

- Gevherhan Hatun (c. 1446 - c. 1514). Married at least one time, she had a son.
- Bayezid II (3 December 1447- 26 May 1512). 8th Sultan of the Ottoman Empire.

== In popular culture ==
- In the 2012 film Fetih 1453, Gülbahar Hatun is portrayed by Turkish actress Şahika Koldemir.
- In the 2013 Turkish series Fatih, Gülbahar Hatun is portrayed by Turkish actress Seda Akman.
- In the second season of Netflix's Rise of Empires: Ottoman (2020-2022), Gülbahar Hatun is portrayed by actress Yasemin Eti.
- In the 2024-2025 Turkish historical fiction TV series Mehmed: Fetihler Sultanı, Gülbahar Hatun was portrayed Esila Umut for the first two seasons and later by Saadet Aksoy. She is currently being portrayed by Turkish actress Aslı Tandoğan, third person to take on the role.

== See also ==
- List of consorts of the Ottoman Sultans

== Bibliography ==
- Karatas, Hasan (2011). The City as a Historical Actor: The Urbanization and Ottomanization of the Halvetiye Sufi Order by the City of Amasya in the Fifteenth and Sixteenth Centuries.
- Peirce, Leslie P. (1993). The Imperial Harem: Women and Sovereignty in the Ottoman Empire. Oxford University Press. ISBN 978-0-195-08677-5.

Ottoman royalty
Preceded by Hüma Hatun	Valide Hatun of the Ottoman Empire; 1481 – 1492	Succeeded by Hafsa Sultan
