= Mehmed: Fetihler Sultanı =

2024 Turkish television series

- Also known as: Fatih: Sultan of Conquests
- Genre: Historical; Adventure; Action; Islamic
- Based on: Mehmed II
- Directed by: Şafak Bal (1–15); Yıldıray Yıdırım (6–); Selahattin Sancaklı (16–61); Ahmet Yılmaz (62–)
- Starring: Serkan Çayoğlu; Gürkan Uygun; İsmail Demirci; Rüzgar Aksoy; Ertuğrul Postoğlu; Ali Sinan Demir; Kenan Çoban; Aslı Tandoğan; Merve Üçer; Former Leads; Fikret Kuşkan; Ayşegül Günay; Perihan Savaş; Luka Peroš; Korel Cezayirli; Seçkin Özdemir; Erdal Küçükkömürcü; Osman Soykut; Tuba Ünsal; Esila Umut; Saadet Aksoy; Barış Bağcı; Selim Bayraktar; Serdar Gökhan; Sinan Albayrak; Alma Terzic; Sena Çakır; Ertan Saban; Serhat Kılıç
- Composer: Can Atilla
- Country of origin: Turkey
- Original language: Turkish
- No. of seasons: 4
- No. of episodes: 92

Production
- Producers: Eyüp Gökhan Özekin; Halis Cahit Kurutlu; Berk Özekin
- Production location: Turkey
- Running time: 130–150 minutes
- Production company: Miray Yapim

Original release
- Network: TRT 1
- Release: 27 February 2024 – present

Mehmed: Fetihler Sultanı (transl. Mehmed: Sultan of Conquests) is a 2024 Turkish historical-based-on-real-event television series directed by Şafak Bal and Yıldıray Yıdırım. The series depicts the life of Ottoman Sultan Mehmed II, starring Serkan Çayoğlu, Selim Bayraktar, Seçkin Özdemir, Ertan Saban, Gürkan Uygun, and Rüzgar Aksoy. The first episode of the series was aired on 27 February 2024 on TRT 1.

== Synopsis ==
=== Season 1 ===
Following Sehzade Aladdin's death, Murad II stepped down from the throne, allowing the eldest heir, Mehmed II, to ascend the throne. Mehmed's biggest dream was to conquer Constantinople; however, the Grand Vizier, Candarli Halil Pasha, thought them to be unrealistic ambitions, eventually resulting in Mehmed's deposition. Arranged by Sultan Murad II, Shehzade Mehmed is forced to marry Gülşah Hatun (historical character), the daughter of Ibrahim Beg of Karamanid Beylik, in a political union that begins with cold diplomatic duty. Immediately after the wedding, Mehmed departs for a military campaign near Constantinople to handle the threat of Prince Orhan and the Byzantine Empire, leaving his new bride behind. Upon his return, however, he makes up for it and following his eventual return to the capital after these state disruptions, Mehmed intentionally sits down with Gülşah to converse and address their strained situation directly.This pivotal personal discussion clears the distance between them, successfully transitioning their forced marriage into a mutual, trusted political partnership prior to his ascension to the throne.Following the forced political alliance, Gülşah Hatun's introduction to the palace causes tension and jealousy for Bahar Hatun(fictional character inspired from Historical Gulbahar Hatun), Mehmed's initial partner and the mother of his eldest son, Beyazed.The narrative subsequently focuses on the domestic friction between the two consorts as they both hold significant, competing positions within Mehmed's household leading up to his ascension.

Following his father's death a few years later, Mehmed once again sat on the throne, this time determined to fulfill his dream. He gained many allies and ended enemies. While Mehmed dealt with the politics, Mara Hatun, Bahar Hatun, and Gulsah Hatun worked hard to ensure the inside enemies, Halime Hatun and Hala Sultan, were cleansed out. By the time the season ended, Mehmed II had no obstacles between him and his goal.

On the other hand, in Constantinople, Konstantinos (known as Constantine historically) and Demetrios constantly clashed over who would take the throne after John VIII's death. The feud ended with Konstantinos taking the throne with help from his mother, Helena Dragas, and the megas doux, Loukas Notaras. However, Konstantinos soon came to realize that his mother and Notaras had placed him on the throne to use him as a puppet ruler. When he learned that they were willing to kill him if they didn't get the power they wanted, Konstantinos killed his mother and exiled Notaras.

=== Season 2 ===
Six months have passed, and Mehmed II continued his preparations to attack Constantinople while Konstantinos XI continued to work hard on the defense, which included ending Notaras' exile and putting aside disputes with his other adversaries so that they could help. Mehmed earned many more allies like Baltoglu Suleyman and Bahadır Paşa, while Konstantinos gained allies like Giovanni Giustiniani and Don Francesco. The siege was intimidating as both sides were prepared: one to conquer the city, the other to save his people.

The long siege ended with Mehmed's victory and Konstantinos' death. However, Mehmed's goals did not stop there.

=== Season 3 ===
The season opens eight years later (around 1461), establishing that Constantinople is now a functioning Ottoman capital. Mehmed focuses on his "Kanunname" (Code of Laws). Gülbahar Hatun and Gülşah Hatun are now established rivals as their sons, Bayezid and Mustafa, have grown into young men ready for their own provinces (Sanjaks). Mahmut Pasha is solidified as Grand Vizier, creating immediate friction with the older statesmen like İshak Pasha. Before Mehmed can deal with Vlad in the West, he must close the "Black Sea" gap. Mahmut Pasha leads the arduous mountain trek. The Ottoman fleet and army converge on the Empire of Trebizond. Trebizond falls, marking the end of the last true Roman/Byzantine holdout. Introduced mid-season as Princess Rose of the Bosnian Kingdom, she enters the Ottoman world amidst the Balkan campaigns. Following political alignments, she is integrated into the harem as Çiçek Hatun. Her arrival completely alters harem dynamics. Bosnia becomes integrated into Ottoman Empire. After the Bosnian campaign, Sultan Mehmed II joins Princess Rose to peacefully negotiate the transition of the Church of St. Mary with Priest Aron, only for the priest to launch a treacherous ambush that leaves the princess critically stabbed in the stomach before Mehmed kills the attacker. While surviving in the field hospital, Rose experiences a spiritual transformation, converts to Islam, and formally takes the name Çiçek Hatun. Meanwhile, a defeated Vlad the Impaler flees to the Hungarian court to beg for military aid, only to find himself trapped in a complex political captivity. Vlad III stops paying tribute and begins his "Terror Campaign." Mehmed marches into Wallachia. This features the legendary "Night Attack of Târgoviște," where Vlad tries to assassinate Mehmed in his tent. Mehmed successfully replaces Vlad with his brother, Radu the Handsome. Vlad is forced to flee and tries to go to Uzun Hasan for help, thinking he will agree, but he is eventually defeated and killed.

=== Season 4 ===
Ten years later, Şehzade Mustafa is sent to Konya. His proximity to the eastern borders brings him into conflict with the Aqqoyunlu (White Sheep Turcomans), setting up a terrifying divide where the state's politicians favor Bayezid, but the state's soldiers favor Mustafa. Mehmed the Great Conqueror went on to fight Uzun Hasan and defeat him the Battle of Utlukbeli.

== Post-production ==
The series incorporates extensive post-production work, including visual effects (VFX), computer-generated environment extensions, digital compositing, color grading, and other finishing processes to recreate the historical setting of the Ottoman Empire. The production combines practical sets with computer-generated imagery (CGI) for large-scale battle sequences, architectural reconstructions, and period environments

Visual effects work for the series has involved multiple studios and artists throughout its production. According to Orzan Studios, the company contributed post-production services including visual effects, digital compositing, CGI environment creation, cleanup, and shot finishing for the series.

== Series overview ==
| Season | Timeslot | Release date | End date | No. of episodes | Section range | Years | Channel |
|---|---|---|---|---|---|---|---|
| One | Tuesdays 18:00 | February 27, 2024 | June 11, 2024 | 15 | 1–15 | 2024 | TRT 1 |
| Two | Tuesdays 18:00 | September 24, 2024 | June 10, 2025 | 34 | 16–49 | 2024–2025 | TRT 1 |
| Three | Tuesdays 18:00 | September 16, 2025 | June 9, 2026 | 34 | 50–83 | 2025–2026 | TRT 1 |
| Four | Tuesdays 18:00 | September 15, 2026 | | | 84– | 2026– | TRT 1 |

== Cast and characters ==
Main
| Actor/actress | Role | Character information |
|---|---|---|
| Serkan Çayoğlu | Fatih Sultan Mehmed Han II | The 7th Sultan of Ottoman Empire and son of Sultan Murad II. He conquers costantinople the Roman Capital in 1453 establishing himself as the "Kayser-i-Rum" . |
| Esila Umut (Seasons 1–2) Saadet Aksoy (Season 3)Aslı Tandoğan (Season 3–4) | Gülbahar "Bahar" Hatun (née Eleni) | Concubine of Mehmed II and the mother of Şehzade Bayezid and Gevherhan Sultan. First lady of Mehmed's Harem. |
| Sena Çakir (Seasons 1–3) Begüm Birgören (Season 4) | Gülşah Hatun | Wife of Mehmed II. Daughter of Karamanoğlu Ibrahim Bey. Mother of Şehzade Mustafa. |
| Urazbey Doğan (Seasons 1–2) Mustafa Arda Işık (Season 3) Caner Topçu (Season 4) | Şehzade Bayezid | The eldest son of Mehmed II with his wife Gülbahar "Bahar" Hatun. Governer of Amasya. |
| Mustafa Konak (Season 3) Özgü Delikanlı (Season 4) | Şehzade Mustafa | The second son of Mehmed II with his wife Gülşah Hatun. |
| Merve Üçer (Seasons 3-4) | Çiçek Hatun (née Princess Rose Tomašević) | Wife of Mehmed II. A former Bosnian princess, the younger sister of King Stephen Tomašević and the stepdaughter of Queen Catherine of Bosnia. Mother of Șehzade Cem, Mehmed's youngest son. |
| Ömer Erkan Özhan (Season 4) | Şehzade Cem | The youngest son of Mehmed II with his wife Çiçek Hatun. |
| Selim Bayraktar (Season1-2) | Candarli Halil Paşa | The Grand Vizier of the Ottoman Empire. He is executed in the last episode of the second season. |
| Seçkin Özdemir (Seasons 1-2) | Konstantinos XI | The last emperor of the Byzantine Empire. Son of Helena Drağas and younger brother of John VIII |
| Ertan Saban (Seasons 2-3) | Vlad Dracula | Voivode of Wallachia |
| Ertuğrul Postoğlu | Ishak Paşa | Vizier of the Ottoman Empire. He was a good friend of Candarli Halil. Mentor of Shehzade Beyazid. |
| Gürkan Uygun (Seasons 2-3) | Mahmud Pasha | Grand Vizer after Halil Pasha's death.Mentor of Shehzade Mustafa. |
| Fikret Kuşkan (Season 1) Osman Soykut (Season 2) | Loukas Notaras | Megas doux of Byzantine. Replaced by actor Soykut in the second season. Notaras is stabbed to death by Ishak Pasha |
| Tuba Ünsal (Season 1-2) | Princess Mara Brankoviç | Daughter of Serbian king Đurađ Branković. Wife of Sultan Murad II and stepmother of Mehmed II |
| Rüzgar Aksoy (Season 4) | Uzun Hasan | Ruler of the Aq Qoyunlu empire. |
| İsmail Demirci (Seasons 3-4) | Gedik Ahmet Pasha | Grand Vizier after Rum Mehmed Pasha's disposal. |
| Deniz Barut (Season 4) | Seljuk Shah Begum | A princess and the first wife of Uzun Hasan, she is the mother to Mirza Zeynel. |
| Öznur Serçeler (Season 4) | Despina Khatun (née Princess Theodora) | Princess of Trebizond, wife of Uzun Hasan, and mother of Mirza Maksud & Mirza Masih. |

Supporting
| Actor/actress | Role | Character information |
|---|---|---|
| Berra Aydınlı (Season 4) | Gevherhan Sultan | Ottoman princess, daughter of Mehmed and Gulbahar Hatun. |
| Zayn Sofuoğlu | Şehzade Selim | Son of Şehzade Beyazid and Ayse Hatun. Grandson of Mehmed and Gulbahar Hatun. |
| İpek Arkan | Ayse Hatun | Concubine of Şehzade Beyazid and mother of Şehzade Selim. |
| Sinan Albayrak | Zağanos Paşa | Trusted vizier and Lala of Mehmed |
| Kenan Çoban | Malkoçoğlu Bali Bey | Leader of Akincis. Belongs to the Malkoçoğlu family |
| Korel Cezayirli | Baltoglu Suleyman | An Ottoman admiral who led the fleet against the Byzantine Empire in 1453 and faced defeat during the siege of Constantinople, leading to his deposition. Killed by Candarli Halil Pasha to cause chaos in the camp. |
| Barış Bağcı | Bahadır Paşa | One of the Turkmens of the Aydınoğlu Principality and a successful captain of the Ottoman navy |
| Bülent Alkiş | Sehabettin Paşa | Trusted Vizier and Lala of Mehmed |
| Ali Sinan Demir | Kurtçu Doğan Ağa | He was the leader of the Janissaries. He was expelled from his duties because he rebelled against Sultan Mehmed, but was later pardoned |
| Mim Kemal Öke | Akşemseddin | Mentor of Mehmed and his supporter |
| Ayşegül Güney | Helena Drağas | Mother of Konstantinos and John. Killed by Konstantinos for trying to take power |
| Gürgen Öz | Don Francesco | A Spanish knight formerly loyal to Mehmed II |
| Volkan Keskin | Demetrios Palaiologos | Younger brother of Constantine XI and John VIII. Son of Helena Dragas |
| Kaan Yalçin | Malkoçoğlu Hamza Bey | Akinci Bey from Malkoçoğlu family. He betrays Bali Bey and eventually becomes the Rumeli Beylerbey |
| Ali Nuri Türkoğlu | Orhan | Cousin of Mehmed II. He is an Ottoman Prince who took refuge in Constantinople. He wanted to be the Sultan with the help of the Byzantines |
| Emine Ün | Halime Hatun | Wife of Murad II. Mother of Prince Ahmed |
| Tolga Akkaya | Saltuk Alp | Alp of the Malkoçoğlu Akinci. He is a friend of Ulubatli Hasan, who died with his love, Fatma Hatun, when Agamemnon caught them |
| Sibel Aytan | Nun Maria Hatun/Fatma Hatun | A nun disguised spy in Constantinople working for Mehmed II. Died with her soon-to-be husband Saltuk when Agamemnon caught them |
| Ali Buhara Mete | Kara Mustafa | He became the Janissary leader during Kurtçu Doğan's temporary deposition. He quit when his love interest, Mihriban Hatun, was killed. Later spied on Orhan for Mehmed II and died when Orhan caught him |
| Beyti Engin | Urban Usta | He is a Hungarian cannon master. Died in a cannon explosion. |
| Recep Çavdar | Saruca Paşa | He deals with the Artillery affairs of Ottoman Empire |
| Sidar Tublek | Ulubatlı Hasan | He is an Malkoçoğlu Akinci alp. A friend of Saltuk who died planting the Ottoman flags on the fall, contributing to the eventual victory of Constantinople |
| Emel Özcan | Anna Notaras | Daughter of Loukas Notaras, lover of Giovanni Giustiniani, and formerly engaged to Constantine XI. However, she has to become the wife of Demetrios Palaiologos following her love's death |
| Ümit Acar | Agamemnon | Spy was sent to end Mehmed's reign after he conquered Constantinople. Caused the deaths of Saltuk and Fatma Hatun when he was almost exposed. In the end, he was caught and beheaded by Bali Bey. |
| Adem Bal | Radu III of Wallachia | Younger brother of Vlad Tepeş and becomes Voivode after Vlad's dethronement. |
| Alma Terzic | Queen Catherine of Bosnia | Queen dowager of Bosnia, stepmother of King Stephen Tomašević and Princess Rose. |
| Recep Usta | King Matthias of Hungary and Croatia | King Matthias of Hungary and Croatia, a formidable and just leader feared by his enemies. |
| Yılmaz Bayraktar | King Stephen Tomašević of Bosnia | King of Bosnia, elder brother of Princess Rose and stepson of Queen Catherine (Katerina), the Queen dowager of Bosnia. |
| Suzan Kardeş | Morena | Mother of Vlad Tepeş and Radu III of Wallachia. |

Featured
| Actor/actress | Role | Character information |
|---|---|---|
| Serdar Gökhan | Evrenesoğlu Ali Bey | Son of Evrenos Bey |
| Luka Peroš | Giovanni Giustiniani | Leader of the Latin knights |
| Ufuk Bayraktar | Mihailoğlu Battal Bey | Sole survivor of the Mihaloğlu family |

Guest
| Actor/actress | Role | Character information |
|---|---|---|
| Teoman Kumbaraçıbaşı | Murad II | The 6th Sultan of the Ottoman Empire. Father of Mehmed II |
| Açelya Akkoyun | Hüma Hatun | Concubine of Murad II and mother of Mehmed II. She dies early in the series. |
| Ghassan Massoud | Abu Ayyub Al Ansari | Companion of Prophet Muhammad |
| Perihan Savaş | Hala Sultan aka Selçuk Hatun | Half-sister of Murad II and step-aunt of Mehmed II |
