= Murad II =

Sultan of the Ottoman Empire (r. 1421–1444, 1446–1451)

- Ghazi
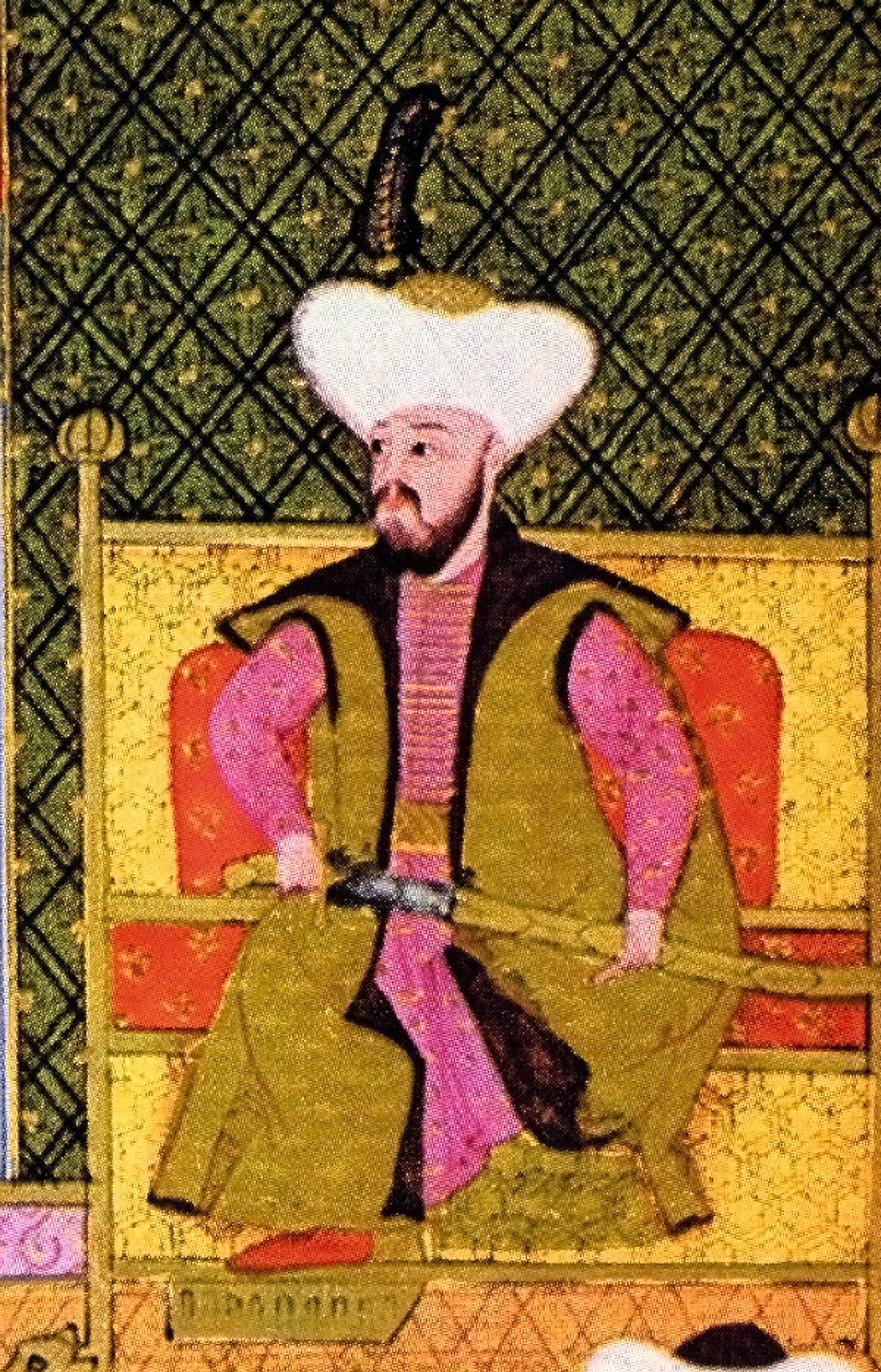
- Ottoman miniature of Murad II enthroned. Hünername, c. 1584–88, TSMK Hazine 1523

Sultan of the Ottoman Empire (Padishah)
- First reign: 26 May 1421 – August 1444
- Predecessor: Mehmed I
- Successor: Mehmed II
- Second reign: September 1446 – 3 February 1451
- Predecessor: Mehmed II
- Successor: Mehmed II
- Born: June 1404; Amasya, Ottoman Sultanate
- Died: 3 February 1451 (aged 46); Edirne, Ottoman Sultanate
- Burial: Muradiye Complex, Bursa, Turkey
- Consorts: Hatice Halime Hatun; Hüma Hatun; Mara Hatun; Yeni Hatun; Hundi Ümmügülsüm Hatun
- Issue Among others: Mehmed II
Names
- Murad bin Mehemmed Han
- Dynasty: Ottoman
- Father: Mehmed I
- Mother: Emine Hatun
- Religion: Sunni Islam
- Tughra
- Military career
- Conflicts: See list: Rebellion of Börklüce Mustafa; Battle of Karaburun; Battle of Manisa (1416); Şehzade Mustafa Rebellion; Battle of Thessalonica (1416); Battle of Ulubad (1422); Battle of Gallipoli (1422); Ottoman wars in Asia; Siege of Samsun; Battle of İznik; Battle of Bolu; Byzantine–Ottoman wars; Siege of Constantinople (1422); Morea Campaign (1446); Siege of the Hexamilion Wall (1446); Siege of Corinth (1446); Siege of Patras (1446); Ottoman–Venetian War (1423–1430); Siege of Thessalonica (1422–1430); Hungarian–Ottoman Wars; Siege of Golubac; Campaign of Hungary (1438); Siege of Smederevo (1439); Siege of Belgrade (1440); Siege of Novo Brdo (1440–1441); War of the South Danube (1420–1432); Battle of Zlatitsa; Battle of Melstica; Battle of Varna; Battle of Kosovo (1448); Campaign in Karamanids (1444); Campaign of Anatolia; Albanian–Ottoman Wars (1432–1479); Albanian revolt of 1432–1436; Siege of Svetigrad; Siege of Krujë (1450)

Murad II (Ottoman Turkish: مراد ثانى, romanized: Murād-ı sānī, Turkish: II. Murad; June 1404 – 3 February 1451) was twice the sultan of the Ottoman Empire, from 1421 to 1444 and from 1446 to 1451.

He succeeded his father, Mehmed I, and spent much of his reign suppressing rebellions and expanding Ottoman territory. He besieged Constantinople in 1422 but had to abandon it as his rebel brother, Küçük Mustafa, invaded Bursa. Later, he annexed several Anatolian states and campaigned against the Karamanids. He fought the Venetians and Hungarians, and gained territory in Greece (1420s–30s), culminating in the capture of Thessalonica, and expanding Ottoman rule in the Balkans (1430s–40s). After briefly abdicating in favor of his son, Mehmed II, he returned to power and helped secure victory at the Battle of Varna in 1444. His reign also saw an increase in trade and the expansion of cities.

== Early life ==
Murad was born in June 1404 to Mehmed I, while the identity of his mother is disputed according to various accounts. According to 15th-century historian Şükrullah, Murad's mother was a concubine. Hüseyin Hüsâmeddin Yasar, an early 20th-century historian, wrote in his work Amasya Tarihi that his mother was Şahzade Hatun, daughter of Divitdar Ahmed Pasha. The most widely accepted view is that his mother was Emine Hatun of the Dulkadirid Beylik.

He spent his early childhood in Amasya. In 1410, Murad came along with his father to the Ottoman capital, Edirne. After his father ascended to the Ottoman throne, he made Murad governor of the Amasya Sanjak. Murad remained at Amasya until the death of Mehmed I in 1421. He was solemnly recognized as sultan of the Ottoman Sultanate at 16 years of age, girded with the Sword of Osman at Bursa, and the troops and officers of the state willingly paid homage to him as their sovereign.

== Reign ==
=== Accession and first reign ===
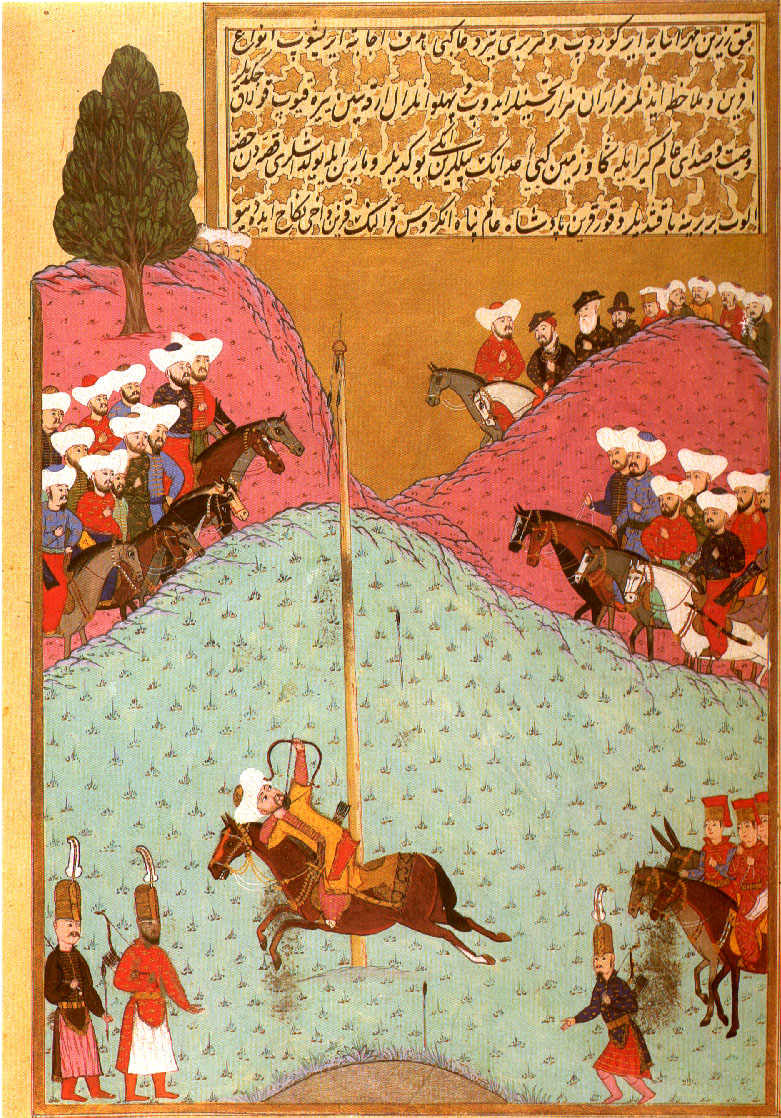
Sultan Murad II at archery practice. Hünername (1584-1588), TSMK Hazine 1523

Murad's reign was troubled by insurrection early on. The Byzantine Emperor, Manuel II, released the 'pretender' Mustafa Çelebi (known as Düzmece Mustafa) from confinement and acknowledged him as the legitimate heir to the throne of Bayezid I (1389–1402). The Byzantine Emperor had first secured a stipulation that Mustafa should, if successful, repay him for his liberation by giving up a large number of important cities. The pretender was landed by the Byzantine galleys in the European dominion of the sultan and for a time made rapid progress. Many Ottoman soldiers joined him, and he defeated and killed the veteran general Bayazid Pasha, whom Murad had sent to fight him. Mustafa defeated Murad's army and declared himself Sultan of Adrianople (Edirne). He then crossed the Dardanelles to Asia with a large army but Murad out-manoeuvered Mustafa. After which, Mustafa's force defected in large numbers to Murad II. Mustafa took refuge in the city of Gallipoli, but the sultan, who was greatly aided by a Genoese commander named Adorno, besieged him there and stormed the place. Mustafa was taken and put to death by the sultan, who then turned his arms against the Roman emperor and declared his resolution to punish the Palaiologos for their unprovoked enmity by the capture of Constantinople.

Murad II then formed a new army called Azeb in 1421 and marched through the Byzantine Empire and laid siege to Constantinople. While Murad was besieging the city, the Byzantines, in league with some independent Turkish Anatolian states, sent the sultan's younger brother Küçük Mustafa (who was only 13 years old) to rebel against the sultan and besiege Bursa. Murad had to abandon the siege of Constantinople in order to deal with his rebellious brother. He caught Prince Mustafa and executed him. The Anatolian states that had been constantly plotting against him — Aydinids, Germiyanids, Menteshe and Teke — were annexed and henceforth became part of the Ottoman Sultanate.

Murad II then declared war against Venice, the Karamanid Emirate, Serbia and Hungary. The Karamanids were defeated in 1428 and Venice withdrew in 1432 following the defeat at the second Siege of Thessalonica in 1430. In the 1430s Murad captured vast territories in the Balkans and succeeded in annexing Serbia in 1439. In 1441 the Holy Roman Empire and Poland joined the Serbian-Hungarian coalition. Murad II won the Crusade of Varna in 1444 against John Hunyadi.

=== Abdication and second reign ===
After the hard fought winter battle at the Zlatitsa Pass against John Hunyadi and Władysław III of Poland, multiple hostile fronts began troubling the Ottoman State. Karamanids in the east had begun raiding Ottoman-held Anatolia, while Albania under its energetic leader, Skanderbeg, was in open rebellion. Having recently lost his son Shehzade Alaedin, Murad was mentally exhausted by years of war and political intrigue, and swiftly signed the Peace of Szeged with the Hungarian government, which included significant Ottoman concessions and began plans to secure his line of succession by abdicating in favor of his son. Two out of three of his sons had unexpectedly died, leaving Mehmed II, governor of Amasya, as Murad's sole surviving son. Mehmed II's first government proved much less effective than his second reign, with decision-making heavily hampered by clashes between the supporters of the 12-year-old Sultan and the Grand Vizier Çandarlı Halil Pasha the Younger. This led to the Grand Vizier recalling Murad II to the capital briefly during the Crusade of Varna and the subsequent Battle of Varna, which was largely led by Murad, the former sultan.

In 1446, upon the instigation of the Grand Vizier, a major rebellion broke out in the capital of Edirne, which was most likely sparked by the state's debasement of the Akçe. This allowed the Grand Vizier to recall Murad II from retirement and convinced him to reassume power. According to some sources, the young sultan Mehmed was on a hunting trip when the events transpired. Since Murad was largely considered as the true wielder of Ottoman authority, his seizure of the throne was largely uncontested.

=== As ghazi sultan ===
When Murad ascended the throne, he sought to regain lost Ottoman territories that had reverted to autonomy following his grandfather Bayezid I's defeat at the Battle of Ankara in 1402 at the hands of Timur. He needed the support of both the public and the nobles "who would enable him to exercise his rule", and utilized the old and potent Islamic trope of the ghazi king.

In order to gain popular international support for his conquests, Murad II modeled himself after the legendary Ghazi kings of old. The Ottomans already presented themselves as ghazis, painting their origins as rising from the ghazas of Osman, the founder of the dynasty. For them, ghaza was the noble championing of Islam and justice against non-Muslims and Muslims alike, if they were cruel; for example, Bayezid I labeled Timur Lang, also a Muslim, an apostate prior to the Battle of Ankara because of the violence his troops had committed upon innocent civilians and because "all you do is to break promises and vows, shed blood, and violate the honor of women." Murad II only had to capitalize on this dynastic inheritance of doing ghaza, which he did by actively crafting the public image of Ghazi Sultan.

After his accession, there was a flurry of translating and compiling activity where old Persian, Arab, and Anatolian epics were translated into Turkish so Murad II could uncover the ghazi king legends. He drew from the noble behavior of the nameless Caliphs in the Battalname, an epic about a fictional Arab warrior who fought against the Byzantines, and modelled his actions on theirs. He was careful to embody the simplicity, piety, and noble sense of justice that was part of the ghazi king persona.

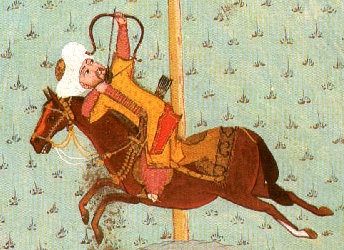
Murad II shooting arrows (detail). Hünername (1584-1588), TSMK Hazine 1523

For example, the Caliph in Battalname saw the battle turning in his enemy's favor, and got down from his horse and prayed, after which the battle ended in a victory for him. In the Battle of Varna in 1444, Murad II saw the Hungarians gaining the upper hand, and he got down from his horse and prayed just like the Caliph. The tide soon turned in the Ottoman's favor and Władysław III of Poland, King of Hungary, was killed in a charge. Similarly, the Caliph in the epic roused his warriors by saying "Those of you who die will be martyrs. Those of you who kill will be ghazis"; before the Battle of Varna, Murad II repeated these words to his army, saying "Those of us who kill will be ghazis; those of us who die will be martyrs." In another instance, since the ghazi king is meant to be just and fair, when Murad took Thessalonica in the Balkans, he took care to keep the troops in check and prevented widespread looting. Finally, just as the fictional Caliph's ghazas were immortalized in Battalname, Murad II's battles and victories were also compiled and given the title "The Ghazas of Sultan Murad" (Ottoman Turkish: غزوات سلطان مراد, romanized: Gazavât-ı Sultan Murad).

Murad II successfully painted himself as a simple soldier who did not partake in royal excesses, and as a noble ghazi sultan who sought to consolidate Muslim power against non-Muslims such as the Venetians and Hungarians. Through this self-presentation, he got the support of the Muslim population of not only the Ottoman territories, for both himself and his extensive, expensive campaigns, but also the greater Muslim populations in the Dar-al-Islam – such as the Mamluks and the Muslim Delhi Sultanates of India. Murad II was basically presenting himself not only as "a ghazi king who fights caffres [non-muslims], but also serves as protector and master of lesser ghazis."

=== Economy ===
Murad II's reign saw a period of great economic development, with an increase in trade and a considerable expansion of Ottoman cities. In 1432, the traveller Bertrandon de la Broquière noted that Ottoman annual revenue had increased to 2,500,000 ducats.

== Appearance ==
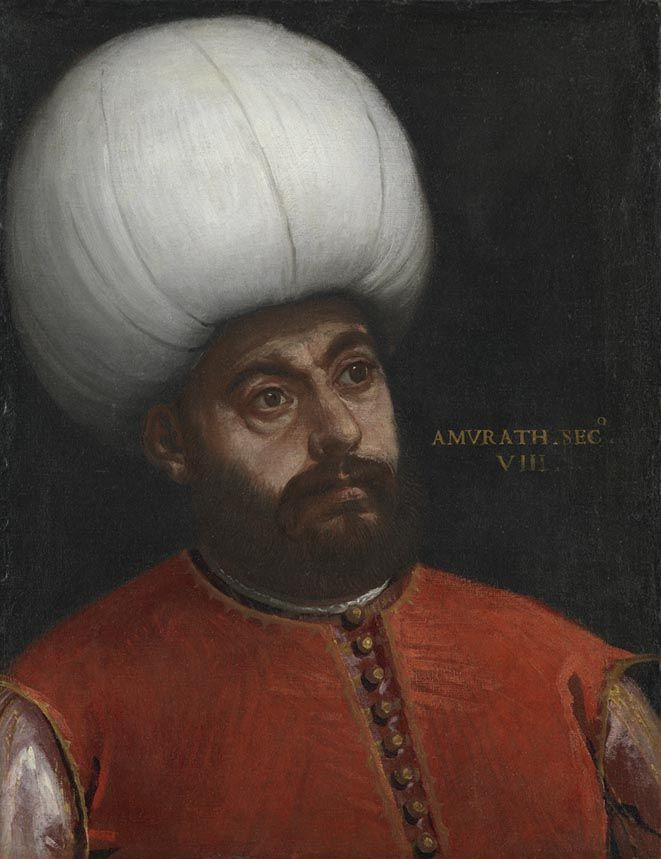
A rendition by Paolo Veronese (active 1550-88)

Bertrandon de la Broquière met with Murad II in Adrianople, and described him in the following terms:

In the first place, as I have seen him frequently, I shall say that he is a little, short, thick man, with the physiognomy of a Tartar. He has a broad and brown face, high cheek bones, a round beard, a great and crooked nose, with little eyes.

== Family ==
=== Consorts ===
Murad II had four or five consorts:

- Tacünnisa Hatice Halime Hatun (c. 1410 – c. 1440), daughter or granddaughter of İsfendiyar Bey, ruler of the Beylik of Candar. Also known as Alime Hatun or Sultan Hatun. She married Murad in 1425. She was the chief consort of Murad II.
- Hatice Hatun, daughter of Taceddin Ibrahim II Bey, son of İsfendiyar Bey. She was the mother of Şehzade Küçük Ahmed. After the death of Murad II her son was executed on the orders of Mehmed II. Mehmed subsequently forced her to marry Ishak Pasha, with whom she had other eight children. According to general consensus, she and Hatice Halime Hatun are the same person.
- Hüma Hatun (? – September 1449). Mother of Mehmed II. Likely a concubine of unknown origin.
- Mara Despina Hatun (c. 1420 – 14 September 1487), born Mara Branković, daughter of Despot of Serbia Durad Branković. She married Murad in September 1435 and was his legal wife. She never converted to Islam and remained a Christian. She had no children.
- Hundi Ümmügülsüm Hatun (? – 14 February 1486). According to some sources, she was two distinct consorts.
- Yeni Hatun, daughter of Şadgeldi Paşahzade Mustafa Bey of the Kutluşah of Amasya. According to some historians, Yeni Hatun was likely the wife of Şehzade Alâeddin Ali (son of Murad II), not Murad II.

=== Sons ===
Murad II was the sultan who conferred on his sons and their male descendants the title of Şehzade, meaning "descendant of the Şah", replacing the simple honorific of Çelebi. The title of Şehzade remained in use until the abolition of the Ottoman Empire.

Murad II had at least eight sons:

- Şehzade Ahmed (1419–1437), also known as Büyük Ahmed (Ahmed the Elder). Buried with his father.
- Şehzade Alaeddin Ali (1425 – June 1443) – with Hundi Ümmügülsüm Hatun. Murad's favorite son, he was governor of Manisa and Amasya. In 1443 he took part in the expedition of Karaman and died on his way back from a fall from his horse. Buried with his father in Muradiye Complex of Bursa. He had a known consort, Yeni Hatun, and two sons: Şehzade Giyaşüddin (1441–1445) and Şehzade Taceddin (1442–1443).
- Şehzade Isfendiyâr (1425–1425) – with Halime Hatun
- Mehmed II (1432–1481) – with Hüma Hatun. Mehmed succeeded his father as Sultan of the Ottoman Empire and was to become known by the epithet Fâtih ("the Conqueror") following his successful conquest of Constantinople in 1453.
- Şehzade Hasan (? – 1444). He died at a young age and was buried in Edirne.
- Şehzade Hüseyin (? – 1450). He died at a young age and was buried in Edirne.
- Şehzade Orhan (? – 1451?). He died at a young age and was buried in Edirne.
- Şehzade Ahmed (May 1450 – 18 February 1451) – with Hatice Hatun. Also known as Küçük Ahmed (Ahmed the Younger).

=== Daughters ===
Murad II had at least six daughters:

- Hundi Hatun (1423 – ?) – with Hundi Ümmügülsüm Hatun. Also known as Erhundi Hatun. She first married Mirahur İlyas Bey and later Yaqub Bey, royal tutor of Şehzade Cem, son of Mehmed II.
- Hatice Hatun (1425 – after 1470) She married Candaroğlu İsmail Kemaleddin Bey and had three sons: Hasan Bey (who married his cousin Kamerhan Hatun, daughter of Mehmed II, and had a daughter, Hanzade Hatun), Yahya Bey and Mahmud Bey. Her descendants were still alive during the reign of Abdulmejid I in the 19th century. In August 1470, she remarried with Isa Bey. When she died, she was buried with her father.
- Hafsa Hatun (1426 – ?)-with Alime Hatun She married her cousin Karamanoğlu Kaya Bey, son of her aunt Ilaldi Sultan Hatun, daughter of Mehmed I, by her husband Ibrahim II of Karaman. They had a son, Karamanoğlu Kasim Bey.
- Fatma Hatun (1430 – after 1464) She married Zaganos Pasha and had two sons: Hamza Bey and Ahmed Çelebi, who would become an important adviser to his cousin Bayezid II. After divorced in 1462, she married Mahmud Çelebi.
- Şahzade Selçuk Hatun (1430 – 21 October 1480). She was married twice, first to Güveyi Karaça Paşah (d. 1456) and then to Yusuf Sinaneddin Paşah (d. 1486). She was buried with her father, next to Şehzade Alaeddin Ali.
- Ilaldi Hatun. She married Kasim Bey, of the İsfendiyaroğulları of Sinop.

== Portrayals ==
Murad II is portrayed by İlker Kurt in 2012 film Fetih 1453, by Vahram Papazian in the Albanian movie The Great Warrior Skanderbeg in 1953, by Tolga Tekin in the 2020 Netflix series Rise of Empires: Ottoman, and by Teoman Kumbaracibaşı in 2024 series Mehmed: Fetihler Sultanı.

== See also ==
- Buçuktepe rebellion

Murad II House of Osman Born: 1404 Died: 3 February 1451
Regnal titles
Preceded by Mehmed I	Ottoman Sultan; 1421–1444	Succeeded by Mehmed II
Preceded by Mehmed II	Ottoman Sultan; 1446–1451	Succeeded by Mehmed II
