= Devlet Hatun =

Concubine of Ottoman Sultan Bayezid I

- Tacü'l-havatin; Sultanü'l-havatin; Seyyidetü'l-muhadderat

Valide Hatun of the Ottoman Empire
- Tenure: 5 July 1413 – 26 May 1421
- Predecessor: Gülçiçek Hatun
- Successor: Emine Hatun
- Born: c. 1370
- Died: January 1422 (aged 51–52); Bursa, Ottoman Empire
- Burial: Devlet Hatun Türbesi, Bursa
- Consort of: Bayezid I
- Issue: Mehmed I
- Religion: Sunni Islam

Devlet Hatun (Ottoman Turkish: دولت خاتون; died in January 1422) was a concubine of Sultan Bayezid I, and the mother of Mehmed I of the Ottoman Empire.

== Biography ==
Devlet Hatun was a concubine of Sultan Bayezid I and the mother of Sultan Mehmed I. Her origins are unknown.

Devlet is often confused with an other Bayezid's consort, Devletşah, due to similar names. The confusion is such that on Devlet's tomb (Devlet Hatun Turbesi in Bursa) are incorrectly indicated the origin and date of death of Devletşah, who was the daughter of Süleyman of Germiyan and died in 1414.

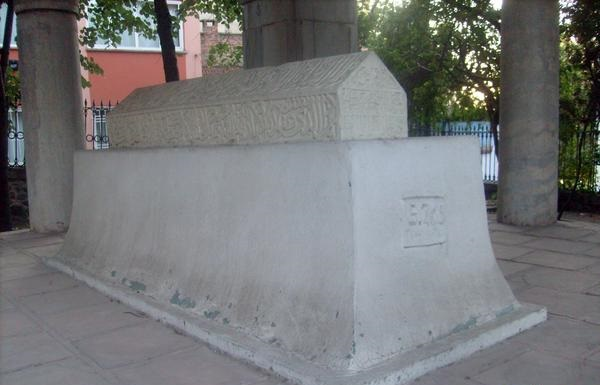
Devlet Hatun's Türbe at Bursa

Devlet Hatun died instead on January 1422. During the Ottoman Integrum she supported her son, Mehmet Çelebi (Sultan Mehmet I), and became Valide Hatun in 1411.

== Issue ==
- Mehmed I (c. 1386 - 1421). He won the civil wars against his half-brothers (Ottoman Interregnum) and became Sultan.

== See also ==
- Ottoman Empire
- Ottoman dynasty
- Ottoman family tree
- List of Valide Sultans
- List of consorts of the Ottoman Sultans

Ottoman royalty
Preceded by Gülçiçek Hatun	Valide Hatun; 5 July 1413 – January 1414	Succeeded by Hüma Hatun
