= Gülçiçek Hatun =

Concubine of Ottoman Sultan Murad I

Valide Hatun of the Ottoman Sultanate
- Tenure: 16 June 1389 – c. 1400
- Predecessor: Nilüfer Hatun
- Successor: Devlet Hatun
- Born: c. 1335; Bithynia, Ottoman Empire (now Northern Anatolia, Anatolia, Turkey)
- Died: c. 1400 (aged 64–65); Bursa, Ottoman Empire
- Burial: Bursa
- Consort of: Murad I
- Issue: Bayezid I Yahşi Bey
- Religion: Sunni Islam (conversion)

Gülçiçek Hatun (Ottoman Turkish: گلچیچک خاتون; c. 1335 - c. 1400), was a Greek woman from Bithynia who became a concubine of Ottoman Sultan Murad I and Valide Hatun to their son Bayezid I.

== Biography ==
According to a tradition, Gülçiçek was a concubine of Aclan Bey, one of the Karasid princes. She was captured when Orhan conquered the principality (c. 1344) and placed in the Sultan's harem. However, modern historians do not accept this claim. It is believed that the wife of Aclan Bey and Murad’s concubine were two separate women. Around 1359, when Orhan's son Murad had reached adulthood, she became his concubine.

She bore Murad two sons, Bayezid I and Yahşi Bey. She appointed her son Yahşi as trustee for an endowment deed she made for a Dervish Monastery. In her lifetime she established a religious and charitable foundation which demonstrated her Muslim piety publicly. With its revenues she built a mosque, the first Ottoman concubine to build one, and a tomb in Bursa where she was buried when she died, around 1400.

Ottoman royalty
Preceded by Nilüfer Hatun	Valide Hatun; 1389 - 1400	Succeeded by Devlet Hatun
