= Mubariz al-Din Isfendiyar =

Bey of Candar (c. 1360–1440)

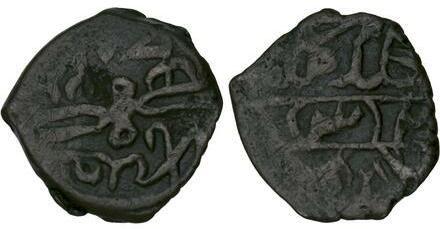
- Coin minted in Kastamonu during Isfendiyar's second reign.

Bey of Candar
- Reign: 1385 – 26 February 1440
- Successor: Ibrâhim II
- Died: February 26, 1440
- Issue Detail: Ibrâhim II; Kıvameddin Kazım Bey; Hızır Bey; Murad Bey; Tacünnisa Hatice Halime Hatun; Saidbaht Hatun
Names
- es-Sultan Mubāriz al-Dīn İsfendiyar Han b. Bayezid
- Dynasty: Candar
- Father: Kötürüm Bayezid
- Mother: Sultan Hatun
- Religion: Sunni Islam

Mubāriz al-Dīn Isfendiyār Bey (Old Anatolian Turkish: عزالدين اصفنديار; c. 1360 – 26 February 1440), was a member of the Candar dynasty that reigned as bey from 1385 until his death in 1440. Although the name of the dynasty is Candar, following his reign, as a testament to its longevity certain historians of the Ottoman Empire also began to refer to the beylik by the name İsfendiyar.

== Early life ==
İsfendiyār was the son of Kötürüm Bayezid, the ruler of the Candarids. His mother was Sultan Hatun of the Ottoman dynasty, the daughter of Süleyman Pasha, who was the son of the second Ottoman sultan, Orhan. His mother's name is unknown, but some historians suggest her name was Efendzade/ Efendizâde Hatun.

Arms of theouse of Cand. ar according to the Catalan Atlas of 1375.

== Ascendance ==
Before his enthronement, the Beylik of Candar had been reduced to a small area around Sinop, a port on the Black Sea coast. In a bid to avoid the loss of his last dominion, as bey İsfendiyar adopted a policy of maintaining peace with his neighbors.

During the reign of the Ottoman Sultan Bayezid I (1389–1402), who had conquered most of the other beyliks of Anatolia, İsfendiyar was able to establish good relations with the other Oghuz Turkic clans. It is believed that the emergence of Kadı Burhaneddin's short lived but powerful Turkmen state in the Central Anatolia was one of the main factors for Ottoman-Candar cooperation. Nevertheless, several beys whose territory had been annexed by the Ottomans took refuge in İsfendiyar Bey's beylik.

== Expansion ==
During Timur's campaign in Anatolia in 1402, he kept the territory of his beylik with Timur's approval. During the Ottoman Interregnum (1402–1413), he followed a balanced policy between the contestants. During the reign of Mehmed I of the Ottoman Empire (1413–1421), he was an ally of the Ottomans.

== Kazım’s revolt and final years ==
In 1416, his son Kazım, with Ottoman support, revolted which forced İsfendiyar Bey to abandon all territory south of the Ilgaz Mountains (i.e. Çankırı). In 1419, the Ottomans annexed the eastern part of the beylik (i.e. Samsun). The death of Mehmed I and the two revolts during the early years of the new sultan Murad II gave İsfendiyar a chance to regain his losses. However, after Murad II stabilized his domestic situation, İsfendiyar was quickly defeated.

According to the terms of the treaty signed circa 1423, İsfendiyar Bey was to abandon his gains but was permitted to keep the territories of Kastamonu and Sinop.

In latter years, İsfendiyar established close familial ties with the Ottomans, firstly with the marriage of his eldest daughter Tacünnisa Hatice Halime Hatun to Murad II, followed by the marriage of his eldest son and heir Tâceddin Ibrâhim II Bey to Selçuk Hatun, daughter of Mehmed I and half-sister of Murad II.

== Marriage and issue ==
=== Consort ===
- Esen Kutlu Hatun (also called Tatlu Hatun; died 3 July 1445, buried in the Isfendiyar Royal Mausoleum, Sinop), mother of Taccedin Ibrahim II Bey;

=== Issue ===
- Tâceddin Ibrâhim II Bey, who reigned as Bey of the Candar Beylik from 1440 to 1443. He married Selçuk Hatun (died 1485, buried in Yeşil Mausoleum, Bursa), daughter of Sultan Mehmed I. By his first wife he had a daughter, Hatice Hatun, who first married Sultan Murad II and, after his death, Ishak Pasha.
- Kıvameddin Kazım Bey, married to Fatma Sultan Hatun, daughter of Sultan Mehmed I;
- Hızır Bey;
- Murad Bey;
- Tacünnisa Hatice Halime Hatun, consort of Sultan Murad II;
- Saidbaht Hatun (died 1459, buried in Isfendiyar Royal Mausoleum, Sinop)

== Death ==
İsfendiyar died on in Sinop on 26 February 1440, after which he was succeeded as bey by his son Tâceddin Ibrâhim II Bey.

== Bibliography ==
- Günal, Zerrin (2000). "İsfendiyar Bey". TDV Encyclopedia of Islam, Vol. 22 (İhvân-ı Safâ – İski̇t) (in Turkish). Istanbul: Presidency of Religious Affairs, Centre for Islamic Studies. pp. 512–514. ISBN 978-975-389-449-4.
- Mordtmann, J. H. (1978). "Isfendiyār Og̲h̲lu". In van Donzel, E.; Lewis, B.; Pellat, Ch. & Bosworth, C. E. (eds.). The Encyclopaedia of Islam, Second Edition. Volume IV: Iran–Kha. Leiden: E. J. Brill. ISBN 978-90-04-05745-6. OCLC 758278456.
- Yücel, M. Yaşar (1 May 1964). "Candar-oğlu Çelebi İsfendiyar Bey 1392-1439". Ankara University History Research Journal (in Turkish). 2 (2): 157–174. doi:10.1501/Tarar_0000000282.

Regnal titles
Preceded by Kötürüm Bayazıt	Bey of Candar; 1385–1440	Succeeded by Ibrâhim II
