= Ishak Pasha =

Grand Vizier of the Ottoman Empire between 1469–72 and 1481–82

Grand Vizier of the Ottoman Empire
- In office 1469–1472
- Monarch: Mehmed II
- Preceded by: Rum Mehmed Pasha
- Succeeded by: Mahmud Pasha Angelovic
- In office 1481–1482
- Monarch: Bayezid II
- Preceded by: Karamanlı Mehmet Pasha
- Succeeded by: Koca Davud Pasha

Personal details
- Died: 30 January 1487 Thessaloniki, Ottoman Empire
- Spouse: Tacünnisa Sultan Hatun

Military service
- Allegiance: Ottoman Empire

Ishak Pasha (Ottoman Turkish: إسحق پاشا, Turkish: İshak Paşa; fl. 1444 – died 30 January 1487) was an Ottoman general, statesman, and later grand vizier.

== Origin ==
Turkish orientalist Halil Inalcik believed that the figure of Ishak Pasha stemmed from confusion among several Ottoman Ishak Pashas (particularly Ishak bin Abdullah and Ishak bin Ibrahim) and Ishak Beys (Ishak Bey Hranić and Ishak Bey Kraloğlu). Theoharis Stavrides concluded that there are indications that the Grand Visier was Ishak bin Ibrahim, who was of Anatolian Turkish origin. According to German orientalist Franz Babinger (1891–1967) he probably was a convert of Orthodox Greek origin. Jean-Claude Faveyrial states that Ishak Pasha was Albanian. Some claim he may have been of Croatian origin.

== Career ==
Сirca 1451, Ishak Pasha was appointed as the beylerbey (provincial governor) of Anatolia; the same year, the newly ascended Sultan Mehmed II forced him to marry Hatice Hatun, one of his father Sultan Murad II's widowed consorts. They had eight children: five sons named Halil Bey, Şadi Bey, Mustafa Çelebi, Piri Çelebi and Ibrahim Bey, and three daughters named Hafsa Hatun, Fahrünnisa Hatun and Şahzade Hatun.

His first term as a Grand Vizier was during the reign of Mehmed II. During this term, he transferred Oghuz Turk people from their Anatolian city of Aksaray to newly conquered Constantinople in order to populate the city, which had lost a portion of its former population prior to the 1453 conquest. The quarter of the city where the migrants were settled is now called Aksaray.

His second term was during the reign of Sultan Bayezid II. He died on 30 January 1487 in Thessaloniki.

== In popular culture ==
- Alev Elmas played Ishak Pasha in the 1951 film, İstanbul'un Fethi.
- Ishak Pasha is referenced in the 2011 video game Assassin's Creed: Revelations, as the former Mentor of the Assassin Brotherhood in the Ottoman Empire, in which his armor was hidden underneath the Hagia Sophia, and is later recovered by the protagonist Ezio Auditore da Firenze by collecting his Memoir Pages scattered around Constantinople. Assassin's Creed Rebellion, a free-to-play mobile game, further details his story during the Spanish Inquisition as he and his apprentice Yusuf Tazim search for Niccolo Polo's journal in 1495 (which contradicts historical records of Ishak Pasha's death in 1487).
- Yılmaz Babatürk portrayed Ishak Pasha in the 2012 film, Fetih 1453.
- Ertugrul Postoglu played Ishak Pasha in Mehmed: Sultan of Conquests.

== See also ==
- Ishak Pasha Palace
- List of Ottoman grand viziers

Political offices
Preceded by Rum Mehmed Pasha	Grand Vizier of the Ottoman Empire; 1469–1472	Succeeded by Mahmud Pasha Angelovic
Preceded by Karamanlı Mehmet Pasha	Grand Vizier of the Ottoman Empire; 1481–1482	Succeeded by Koca Davud Pasha
