= Mustafa Çelebi =

Ottoman prince (fl. 1402–1422)

Sultan of the Ottoman Empire (claimant)
- 1st reign: January 1419 – 1420
- Opposing: Mehmed I
- 2nd reign: January 1421 – May 1422
- Opposing: Murad II
- Born: Unknown
- Died: May 1422
- Spouse: A daughter of Ahmad Jalayir
- Father: Bayezid I
- Religion: Sunni Islam

Mustafa Çelebi (fl. c. 1402 – May 1422), also called Mustafa the Impostor (Turkish: Düzmece Mustafa or Düzme Mustafa), was an Ottoman prince who struggled to gain the throne of the Ottoman Empire in the early 15th century. He ruled parts of Rumelia twice between January 1419 – 1420 and January 1421 – May 1422.

== Background ==
Mustafa was one of the sons of Bayezid I, the Ottoman sultan. After the Battle of Ankara in which his father Bayezid was defeated by Timurlane, Mustafa as well as Bayezid himself was taken as a prisoner of war. After that, no trace of him was found and he was presumed dead. According to one version of events while his four brothers were fighting each other during the Ottoman Interregnum, he was held captive in Samarkand (in modern-day Uzbekistan). After the death of Timurlane, he returned to Anatolia in 1405 and hid himself in the territories of the Turkish beyliks.

== First rebellion ==
After the interregnum, from which his brother sultan Mehmed I had emerged victorious, Mustafa, or an impostor who claimed to be him, as Ottoman sources wrote, appeared in Rumelia (the European portion of the Ottoman Empire) with the help of Byzantine emperor Manuel II Palaiologos. He also had the support of Mircea I of Wallachia and Cüneyt Bey, the ruler of the Turkish Aydinid beylik. Mustafa asked Mehmed I, who had recently defeated his other claimant brothers, to partition the empire with him. Mehmed refused this request and easily defeated Mustafa's forces in battle. Mustafa took refuge in the Byzantine city of Thessaloniki in 1416. After reaching an agreement with Mehmed, the Byzantine emperor Manuel exiled him to the island of Lemnos.

== Second rebellion ==
After the death of Mehmet I in 1421, Mustafa felt that he could easily defeat Murad II, Mehmet's son and successor. With the help of the Byzantines, he captured Gelibolu, the fort which controlled the strait of the Dardanelles, and after capturing Edirne, the European capital of the empire, he began ruling in Rumeli. Next, he convinced the people that he was indeed Bayezid's son and gained the support of the Ottoman provincial governors in Rumeli. Although Murad sent troops over the strait of Bosphorous to defeat Mustafa, even these troops joined his forces in the Battle of Sazlıdere. Growing overconfident in his abilities, Mustafa decided to cross the Dardanelles and complete his conquest of the Asian side of the empire in Anatolia.

Mustafa crossed into Anatolia with an army of 18,000. Mustafa set out to capture Bursa. Learning of Mustafa's advance on Bursa, Murad II launched an expedition against him with his army. The two sides met near the Lake Uluabat, and Mustafa was defeated in the first battle. However, in Anatolia, Mihaloğlu (a descendant of Köse Mihal), a partisan of Murad who was very famous in Rumeli, encouraged Mustafa's allies to betray him and support Murad instead. Furthermore, some of Mustafa's allies, notably Cüneyt Bey, abandoned him. Mustafa gave up his hopes to conquer Anatolia and escaped to Rumeli, with Murad's forces in pursuit. To cross the strait of the Dardanelles after Mustafa, Murad asked for the help of Genoan vessels, for which he paid an exorbitant price. With Genoese support, Murad II first arrived at Gallipoli and captured Gallipoli. When Gallipoli fell, Mustafa fled to Edirne. Murad II marched on Edirne with his army and captured the city. Following the fall of Edirne, Mustafa fled the city and was captured shortly thereafter. Mustafa was executed on Murad II's orders.

== Execution and aftermath ==
Mustafa was sentenced to death and was hanged in 1422. Although inter-dynasty executions were common in the Ottoman dynasty, hanging was not the usual treatment for a dynasty member; more "dignified" execution methods were normally used. It is thought that Murad wanted to send the message that Mustafa was not his genuine uncle (although he was) but an impostor. Thus, contemporary Ottoman historians called him düzmece (lit. 'fake, impostor"') Mustafa. Aşıkpaşazade mentions that Mustafa was brought by crawling to the execution place, and that he wanted to say something to Murad, but was hanged without even being given the opportunity.

It is also mentioned that one of his sons was held hostage by the Byzantine emperor, but there is no information about his fate. There were also claims that Mustafa Çelebi managed to escape to Wallachia, then to Cafa, and then returned to Thessaloniki where he participated in the long siege of the city on the side of the Venetian defenders. Meantime, another Düzme Mustafa was unearthed by Venice, claimed to be the son of Bayezid, and that collaborated with the Venetian navy in the spring of 1425.

=== Legacy ===
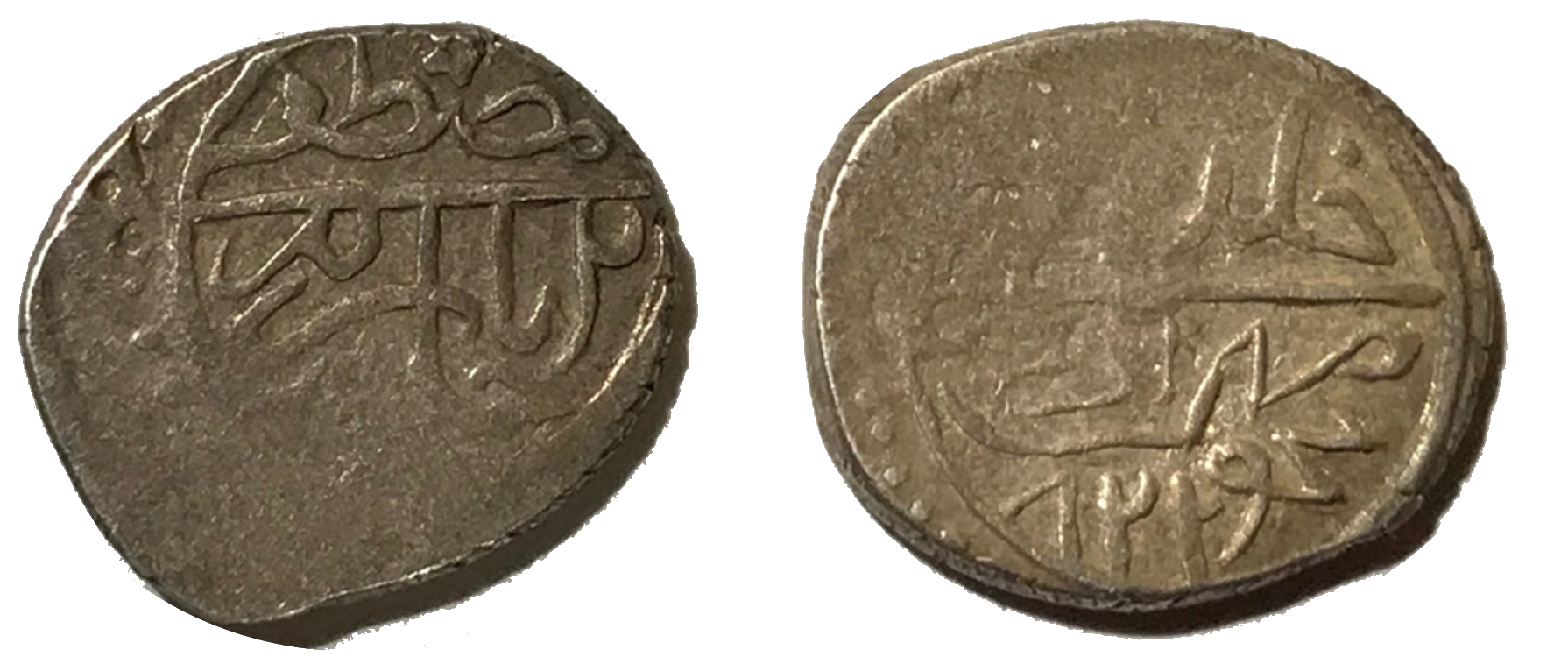
Akçe minted in the name of Mustafa Çelebi. On the obverse: "Mustafa son of Bayezid Khan". On the reverse: "[May God] perpetuate his reign. Struck [in] Edirne, 8224 [sic]"

His silver coins struck in Edirne dating 824 AH (1421 AD), and the copper coins minted in Serres have survived to this day.
