= Sultan Hatun =

Sultan Hatun may refer to:

- Sultan Hatun (daughter of Murad I), also Nefise Melek;
- Sultan Hatun (daughter of Bayezid I), also Fatma Hundi;
- Sultan Hatun (wife of Bayezid I), also Devletşah;
- Sultan Hatun (wife of Murad II), also Hatice Halime.
