= İsa Çelebi =

Ottoman prince, co-ruler during the Ottoman Interregnum

Îsâ Çelebi
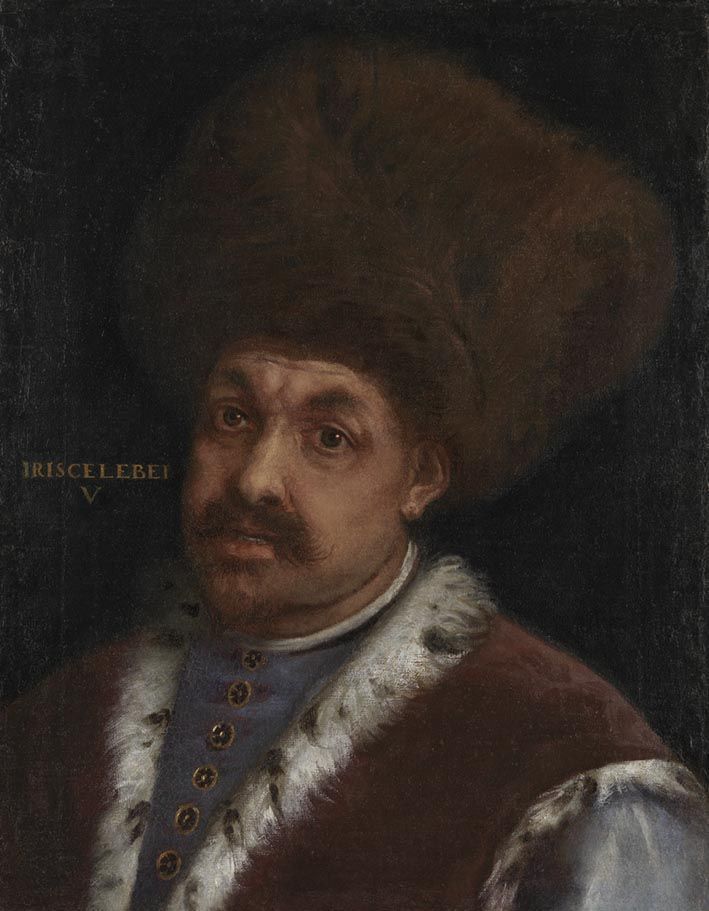
- İsa by Paolo Veronese (16th century)

Sultan of the Ottoman Empire (claimant)
- Reign: January 1403 − March/May 1403
- Predecessor: Bayezid I
- Successor: Mehmed I

Governor of Karesi (as Timurid vassal)
- Reign: 16 December 1402 – January 1403

Governor of Hamid
- Reign: c. 1391 – unknown
- Born: Unknown
- Died: September 1403; Eskişehir, Ottoman Empire
- Burial: Bayezid I Mosque, Bursa, Turkey
- Consort: Daughter of John Tonterez
- Father: Bayezid I
- Mother: Devletşah Hatun
- Religion: Sunni Islam

Îsâ Çelebi (Ottoman Turkish: عیسی چلبی, romanized: ʿĪsā Çelebī; fl. c. 1391 – September 1403) was an Ottoman prince and a co-ruler of the empire during the Ottoman Interregnum.

== Background ==
İsa was one of the sons of Bayezid I, the Ottoman sultan. His mother was Devletşah Hatun, the daughter of Süleyman Şah of Germiyanids and Mutahhara Abide Hatun. Isa was appointed as the sanjak governor of Hamid after its conquest. Some sources mention his participation in the Battle of Nicopolis, however this cannot be verified. In 1402, he participated in the Battle of Ankara alongside his father. After the defeat, he escaped and hid around Balıkesir. By November 1402, he had established dominance on the Asian side of the Bosphorus and the south of the Sea of Marmara. Immediately after Timur took Smyrna in 16 December 1402, he expressed his loyalty to Timur through his ambassador Kutbüddin İznikî. He sent Timur valuable horses and gifts together with the ambassador. Timur also sent him a belt, a cap and a robe and gave him the administration of the Karesi (Balıkesir) region.

== Ottoman Interregnum ==
In 1403, after learning about his father's death in captivity, he began to struggle for the vacant throne against his brothers Mehmed Çelebi, Musa Çelebi, and Süleyman Çelebi. He fought against Musa to gain control of Bursa, the Anatolian capital of the empire. He defeated Musa and won control of a part of Anatolian territory of the empire. But the European territory, Rumeli, was under the control of Süleyman and the east part of Anatolian territory was under the control of Mehmed. Feeling his lands to be fragile situated between his brothers' on both sides, he signed a treaty of friendship with the Byzantine emperor Manuel II Palaiologos and refused Mehmed's suggestion to partition the Anatolian part of the empire with him, on the grounds that he was the elder brother and was entitled the entirety of the territory. But following this refusal, he was defeated by Mehmed in the Battle of Ulubad in March or May 1403. In this battle, he also lost his vizier Timurtaş, who was an experienced statesman. He escaped to Rumeli over Byzantine territories.

He met with Süleyman, who supported his cause in Anatolia. With fresh troops provided by Süleyman, he returned to Anatolia and tried to recapture Bursa. Although he failed, allying himself with the Anatolian beyliks, which his father Beyazıt I had captured but which had regained independence after Beyazıt's defeat at the Battle of Ankara, he continued to fight against Mehmed. However, after a series of defeats and the betrayal of his allies, İsa gave up the war for the throne.

After losing the struggle, İsa went into hiding, and was spotted in a public bath (hamam) in Eskişehir, and was strangled by Mehmed's partisans in 1403. Ruy González de Clavijo wrote that İsa Çelebi wasn't alive in September 1403. His body was buried next to his father in Bursa. In historical sources, he is described as a characterful prince, but also as an unfortunate and weak person.

== Aftermath ==
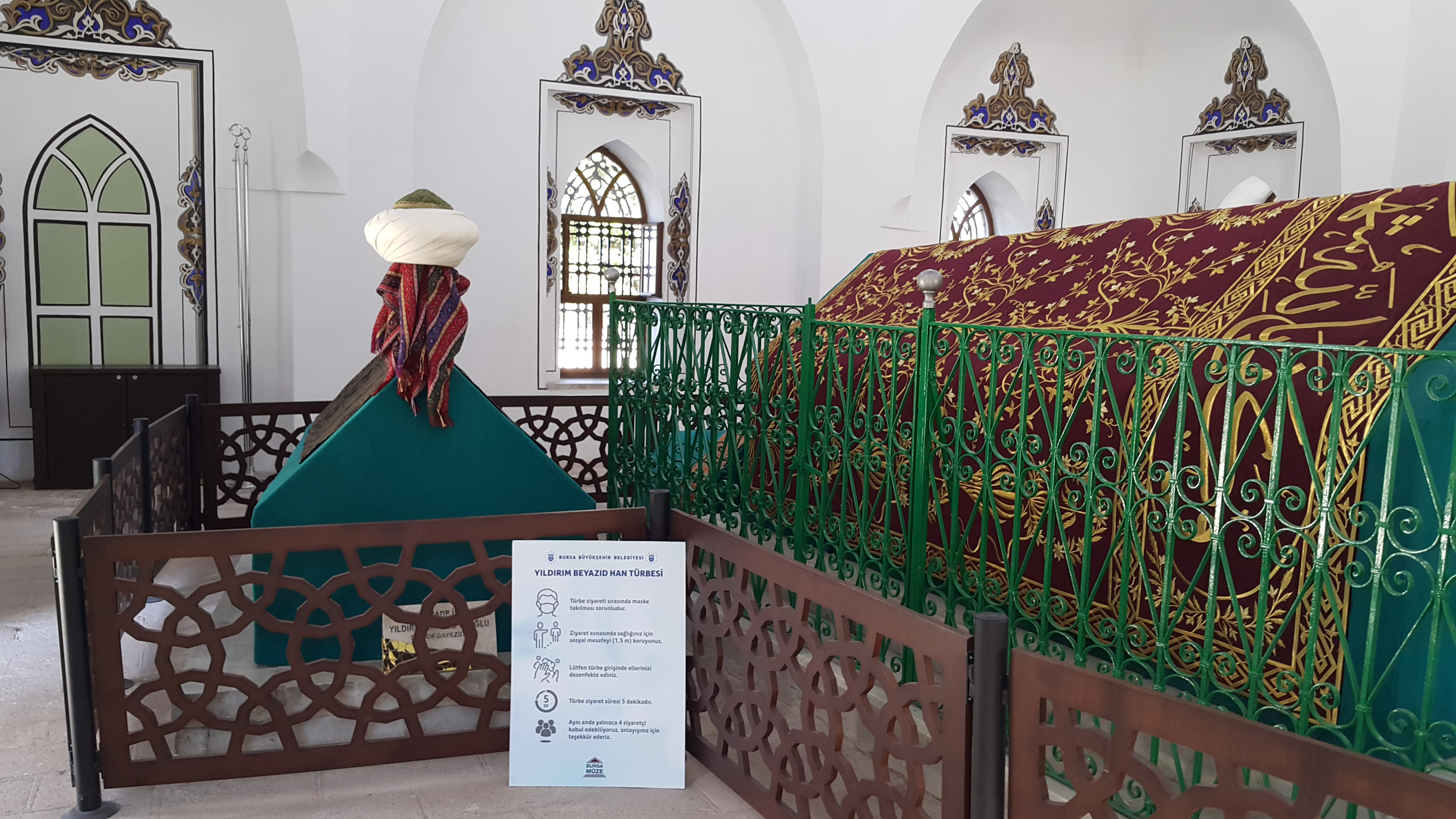
İsa's tomb (left) besides his father's tomb (right).

After his death, the interregnum continued till 1413. In 1413, Mehmet became the sole ruler of the empire as Mehmed I after defeating Musa. Another one of the brothers, Mustafa Çelebi, who had been in hiding during the interregnum, later led two failed rebellions against the throne, one against Mehmet in 1416, and another in 1421 against his nephew Murad II. Murat called Mustafa Çelebi düzmece ("the impostor") and executed him.
