= Battle of Ulubad =

Part of the Ottoman Interregnum battles

- Part of the Ottoman Interregnum
Date	1403
Location	Ulubad, Anatolia
Result	Victory for Mehmed Çelebi

Belligerents
Forces of Mehmed Çelebi	Forces of İsa Çelebi

Commanders and leaders
Mehmed Çelebi	İsa Çelebi

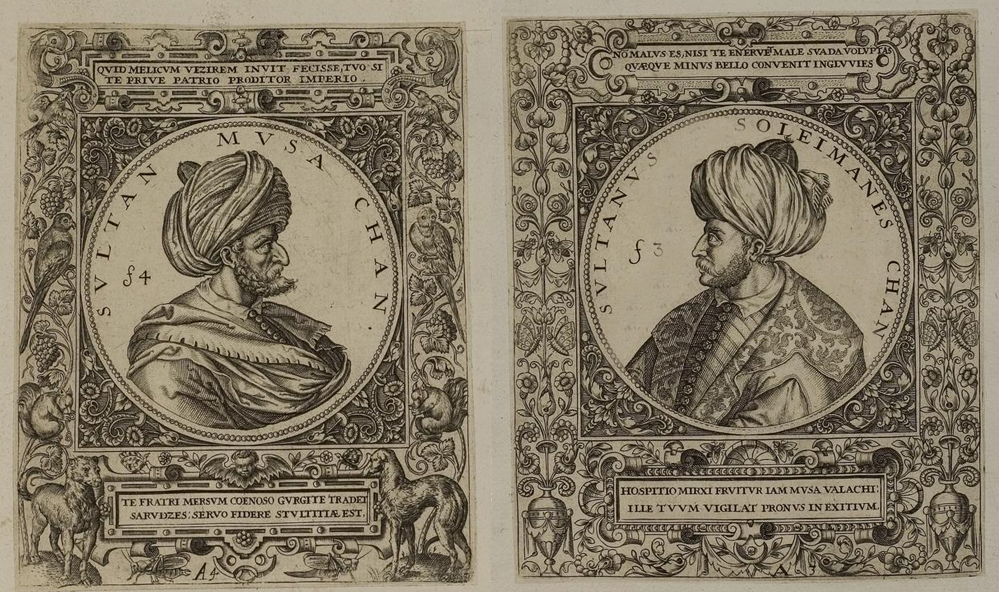
Ottoman princes Musa and Süleyman Çelebi

The Battle of Ulubad was fought sometime between 9 March and early May 1403 at Ulubad between the rival sons of the Ottoman Sultan Bayezid I, Mehmed Çelebi and İsa Çelebi, during the first stages of the civil war known as the Ottoman Interregnum. The battle was a major victory for Mehmed, who occupied the Ottoman capital, Bursa, and became master of the Ottomans' Anatolian domains. İsa fled to the Byzantine capital Constantinople, while Mehmed proceeded to formally lay claim to the succession of Bayezid by an enthronement ceremony in Bursa, and by having his father's body buried there. By 18 May 1403, however, İsa returned to Anatolia with an army provided by their oldest brother, Süleyman Çelebi, ruler of Rumelia. İsa was again defeated and eventually killed after a series of battles by September.

== Sources ==
- İnalcık, Halil (1991). "Meḥemmed I". In Bosworth, C. E.; van Donzel, E. & Pellat, Ch. (eds.). The Encyclopaedia of Islam, Second Edition. Volume VI: Mahk–Mid. Leiden: E. J. Brill. pp. 973–978. doi:10.1163/1573-3912_islam_COM_0728. ISBN 978-90-04-08112-3.
- Kastritsis, Dimitris (2007). The Sons of Bayezid: Empire Building and Representation in the Ottoman Civil War of 1402-13. BRILL. ISBN 978-90-04-15836-8.
- Magoulias, Harry, ed. (1975). Decline and Fall of Byzantium to the Ottoman Turks, by Doukas. An Annotated Translation of "Historia Turco-Byzantina" by Harry J. Magoulias, Wayne State University. Detroit: Wayne State University Press. ISBN 978-0-8143-1540-8.
