= Amir Sultan =

Ottoman Sufi mystic (1348–1409)

Sayed Shamsuddin Mohamed Bin Ali Al-Hussain Al-Bukhari
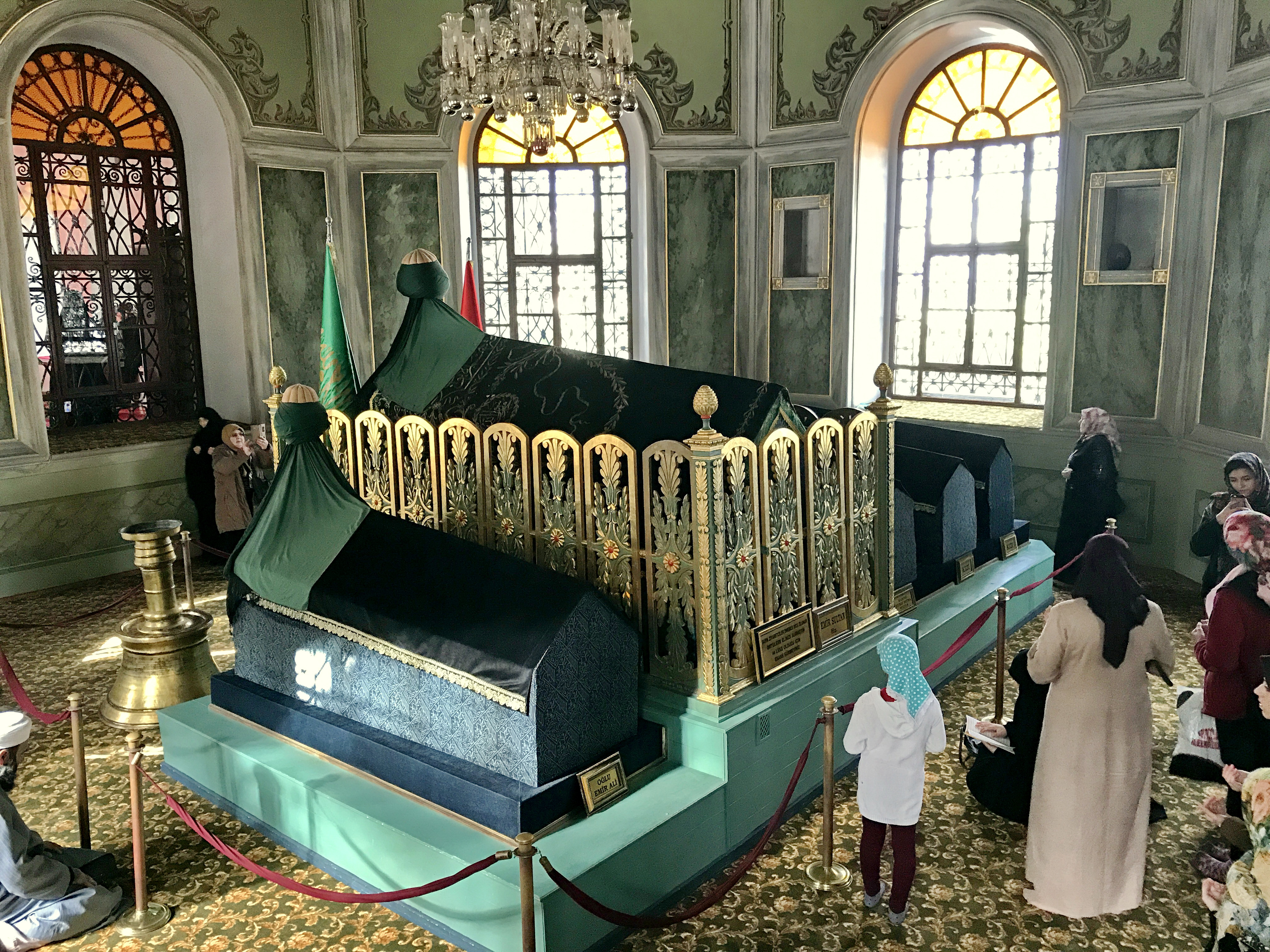
- Tomb of Emir Sultan, spouse, son and two daughters in Bursa, Turkey
- Born: 1368; Bukhara, Chagatai Khanate
- Died: 1429 (aged 60–61)
- Other names: Emir Sultan, Mohamed Al-Bukhari, Shamsuddin Al-Bukhari, Mohamed bin Ali
- Spouse: Fatma Hundi Hatun (m. 1390)
- Children: Emir Aliu; Three sons; Two daughters

Notes
- Amir Sultan was a Sunni Muslim.

Amir Sultan or Emir Sultan (1348, Bukhara - 1429, Bursa) was a Kubrawi Sufi leader who lived in Bursa during the Rise of the Ottoman Empire. He was a grandson of the Bukharan religious leader Amir Kulal, the spiritual guide of Timur Gurkan.

== Biography ==
Emir Sultan's name is Muhammad bin Ali and his nickname is Shamsuddin. He was born in Bukhara and immigrated to Bursa in 1390 following an invitation from the Ottoman Sultan Bayezid the Thunderbolt to move to Anatolia. Bayezid I had a daughter named Fatma Hundi Hatun who was married to Amir Sultan. They had four sons, among them Emir Ali, and two twins daughters. Emir Sultan's lineage goes back to Hussein, the grandson of the Islamic prophet Muhammad. He was called "Muhammed Bukhari" because he was born in Bukhara, "Emir Bukhari" because he was a Sayyid, and "Emir Sultan" because he was dear to people's hearts - sultan of hearts - and after he became the son-in-law of Sultan Bayezid I.

== Bayezid I and Timur ==
By the end of fourteenth century Timur and Bayezid I had emerged as two superpowers in Asia and Europe, making the confrontation between two a matter of time. Timur took the lead and conquered the Ottoman city of Sivas, disseminating the local population in his trademark style. At the same time two princes, Ahmad Jalayir (Jalayirids) and Kara Yosuf (Qara Yusuf) sought for protection at Bayezid I's court. Their territories had been conquered by Timur. Timur sent two embassies demanding surrender of the two princes, but Bayezid I refused. Bayezid I went a step further and prepared for an attack on Timur's territory. At this point his son-in-law Amir Sultan advised him against the move knowing well the penchant and proficiency of Timur and his soldiers in a battlefield. However, his genteel council fell on deaf ears. Instigated and incited by the two princes Bayezid I seized Erzurum which was under Timur's rule. To Timur this was declaration of war and in his symbolic manner he started conquering Ottoman cities one by one with whirlwind speed. Bayezid I took his army to stop Timur and the two goliaths met at the plains of the Battle of Ankara on 20 July 1402 (804AH). Although Bayezid I had made a fierce reputation in Europe as a brilliant general and ferocious warrior but he was no match for Timur whose years in battlefield far exceeded Bayazid's age. The Timurid attack was ruthless and merciless and in one word, Timur “annihilated” the Ottoman army, taking Bayezid I, his children and princes as captives.

Amir Sultan had decided not to be a party of the war. It was because of the family associations with the Barlas tribe he decided not to be associated with either side while the state-of-war lasted between the two sovereigns. It might have been this decision coupled with the fact that his family was regarded as mentors by the Timurid dynasty which meant he did not share the same fate as his in-laws. After the battle Amir Sultan returned to his native soil at Vabkent. His children went to Chinese Turkistan. After Babur established the Mughal Empire his descendants moved to India. Among them Shah Jamal, Shah La’al, Shah Abbas, and Shah Altaf are the notables.

== Emir Sultan Mosque ==
Emir Sultan died in Bursa in 1429. His tomb (türbe) is in the Emir Sultan Mosque in Bursa.
