= Battle of Akçay =

1390s battle in Turkey

- Part of the Ottoman wars in Asia
Date	1397 or 1398
Location	Akçay, Edremit
Result	Ottoman victory

Belligerents
Karamanids	Ottoman Empire

Commanders and leaders
Alâeddin Ali Bey (executed)	(Ottoman Empire) Bayezid I

The Battle of Akçay was a battle between the Ottoman Sultanate under Bayezid I and the Karamanids in 1397 or 1398. After the battle, which resulted in a decisive victory for the Ottomans, the lands of Karaman were annexed into the Ottoman Empire. Karamanid leader, Alâeddin Ali Bey, who had been a thorn in the Ottomans' side for many years, was executed.

== Background and battle ==
During the Battle of Nicopolis (1396), Alaeddin Ali Bey attacked Ankara and captured Sarı Timurtaş Pasha, the beylerbey of Anatolia Eyalet, responsible for defending the city. (Note: There were three historical figures named Timurtaş Pasha. Sarı Timurtaş Pasha should not be confused with Kara Timurtaş Pasha or Çandarlı Ali Pasha’s slave and namesake.) After the Ottoman victory at Nicopolis, Alaeddin Ali Bey dressed Timurtaş Pasha in robes of honor and sent him along with envoys to Bayezid I in hopes of reconciliation. Bayezid rejected the offer and marched against the Karamanids. A two-day-long battle ensued in the Akçay plain near Konya without a decisive result. However, during the second night, approximately 30,000 Ottoman troops encircled the Karamanid forces. Trapped between two fires, the Karamanids retreated and took refuge within the fortress of Konya. After an eleven-day siege, the Ottomans persuaded the city's populace to surrender by guaranteeing their safety and property. Alaeddin Ali Bey, who fell from his horse while fleeing, was captured and brought before Bayezid in chains. When Bayezid questioned why he did not submit, Alaeddin Ali Bey replied that he too was a sovereign like Bayezid. Angered by the response, Bayezid ordered his execution. His head was placed on a spear and paraded through the city.

== Aftermath ==
After appointing a governor to Konya, Bayezid marched on Larende (modern Karaman), where Alaeddin Ali Bey’s wife and children were located. The city resisted briefly but eventually surrendered. Alaeddin Ali Bey’s sons, Mehmed and Ali, handed over the keys to the city. Bayezid sent the family to Bursa and installed one of his own beys in Larende. With Alaeddin Ali Bey's death, the northern Karamanid territories—Konya, Larende, Niğde, Develi, and Karahisar—were incorporated into the Ottoman Empire. Meanwhile, cities and fortresses south of the Taurus Mountains such as Mut, Ermenek, Taşeli, and İçel remained under the control of other Karamanid family branches. The battle is named the "Battle of Akçay" after the plain where it occurred.
