= Yusuf Çelebi =

Ottoman prince

Yusuf Çelebi (Greek: Δημήτριος; 1392 – 1429) was an Ottoman prince and the son of Sultan Bayezid I who did not play an active role in the Ottoman Interregnum. In Byzantine sources and prosopographical records, his name and title are preserved as Tzalapès kyr Dēmētrios (Greek: Τζαλαπὴς κὺρ Δημήτριος).

He arrived in Constantinople after 1402. According to Laonikos Chalkokondyles, he came of his own accord, independently of the princely hostages handed over to Emperor Manuel II Palaiologos by Süleyman Çelebi, probably to escape from the political crisis taking place during the civil war. Nevertheless, the Byzantine historian Doukas refers to his status as a hostage at the Byzantine court, where he was educated in a Byzantine school. During this period, he befriended the future emperor John VIII Palaiologos, with whom he became very close friends. He later converted to Christianity, taking the name "Dēmētrios". He died of natural causes in 1429.

Yusuf was betrothed to Theodora, daughter of Despot Theodore I Palaiologos of the Despotate of the Morea, marking the only recorded occurrence of a male Ottoman dynast being integrated into the Byzantine imperial family through marriage. His upbringing in Constantinople is also cited as a prominent example of an Ottoman prince receiving a Byzantine education while retaining his native Turkish language.
