= Emir Sultan Mosque =

Mosque in Bursa, Turkey

- Emir Sultan Camii
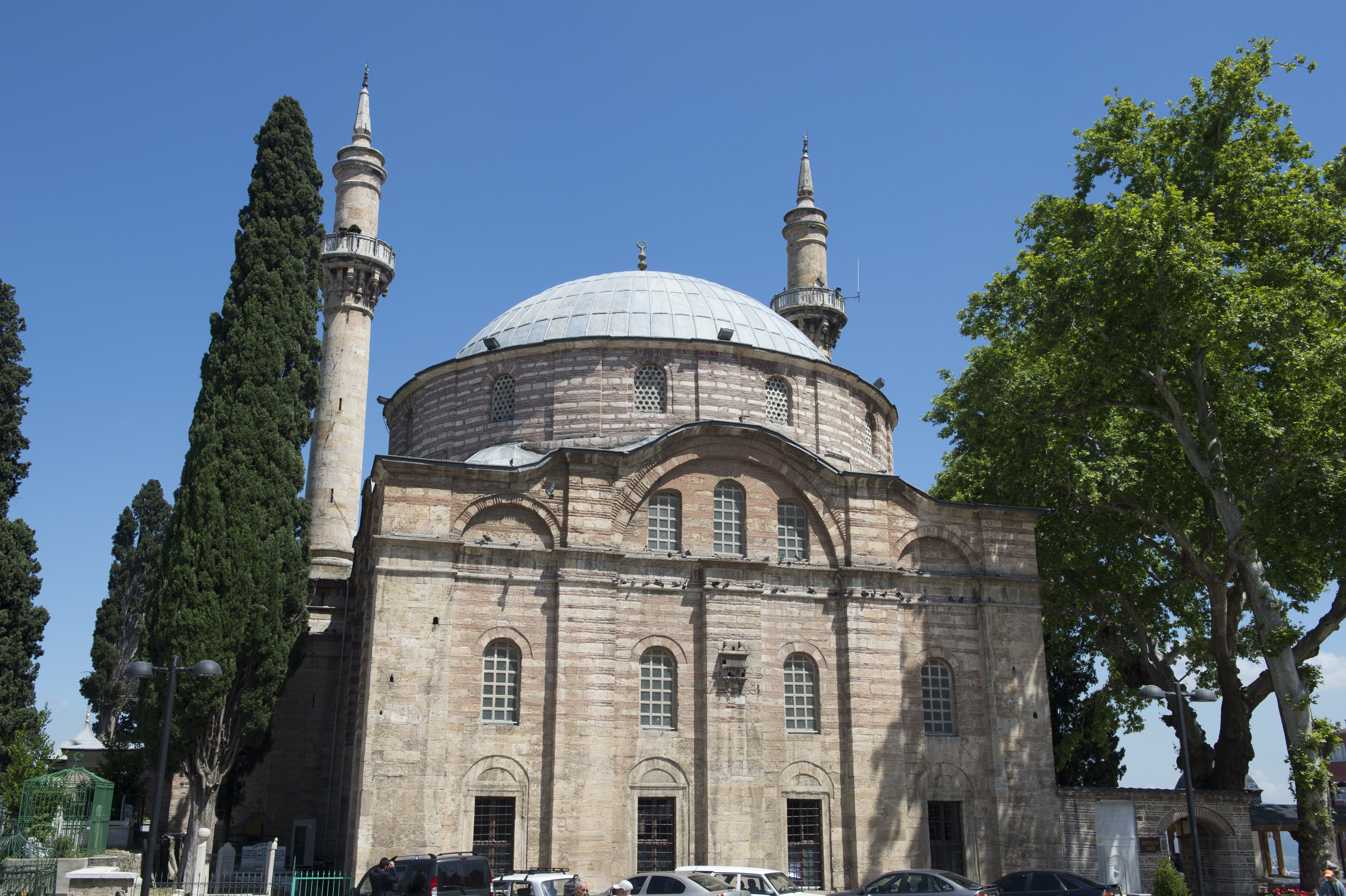

- Location in Turkey

Religion
- Affiliation: Islam

Location
- Location: Bursa, Turkey
- Coordinates: 40°10′52″N 29°04′52″E

Architecture
- Type: Mosque
- Style: Ottoman Baroque
- Completed: 15th century (rebuilt in 19th century)
- Minaret: 2

The Emir Sultan Mosque (Turkish: Emir Sultan Camii) is a mosque in Bursa, Turkey. First built in the 15th century, it was rebuilt in 1804 for the Ottoman sultan Selim III and rebuilt again in 1868, the plan of the mosque changing slightly with each rebuild.

== History ==
Emir Sultan, also known as Şemseddin Mehmed Ali el-Hüseyin el Buhari (Mehmed Şemseddin), was a dervish and scholar from Bukhara and also the advisor and son-in-law of the Ottoman sultan Bayezid I. The religious complex around his tomb was first established by Sultan Mehmed I in the early 15th century. It was further developed during the reign of Murad II (between 1421 and 1451), when Hundi Fatma Hatun, daughter of Bayezid I, built the complex's first mosque.

The present-day mosque is situated in the quarter of Bursa also called Emirsultan. It was built after the original 15th-century building collapsed in the 1766 earthquake. When it was rebuilt by Selim III, the previous mosque's foundations and some of its materials were reused in the construction, resulting in a work that mixes archaic Ottoman elements with new Ottoman Baroque ones. Following the 1855 Bursa earthquake, the Emir Sultan Mosque and the mausoleum (Turkish: türbe) were once again rebuilt in 1868 (1285 AH), this time in a pure Baroque style, in for Sultan Abdülaziz.

== Architecture ==
The mosque and mausoleum stand on opposite sides of a long courtyard with large şadırvan (ablutions fountain) at the entrance. The courtyard entrances are at the east and west ends, and the mosque and mausoleum are accessed via the courtyard. A wooden arcade with pointed arches wraps around the courtyard and rises to form portals with tall domes in the bays leading into the buildings.

The mosque, to the south of the courtyard, is a tall single-unit prayer hall of masonry construction with two minarets at the northern corners. The mausoleum, also on the south side, is composed of a domed room in the centre with smaller rooms to its sides and houses the tombs of Emir Sultan and his family. Other rooms on the north corner of the courtyard are used by the imams. An Ottoman cemetery flows downhill from the complex.

Hundi Hatun, the wife of Emir Sultan and daughter of Bayezid I, was responsible for the hamam to the south of the mosque. There are several historic fountains scattered around the complex (külliye), the earliest dating from 1743. One of them appears in a drawing by the British traveller and artist Thomas Allom.

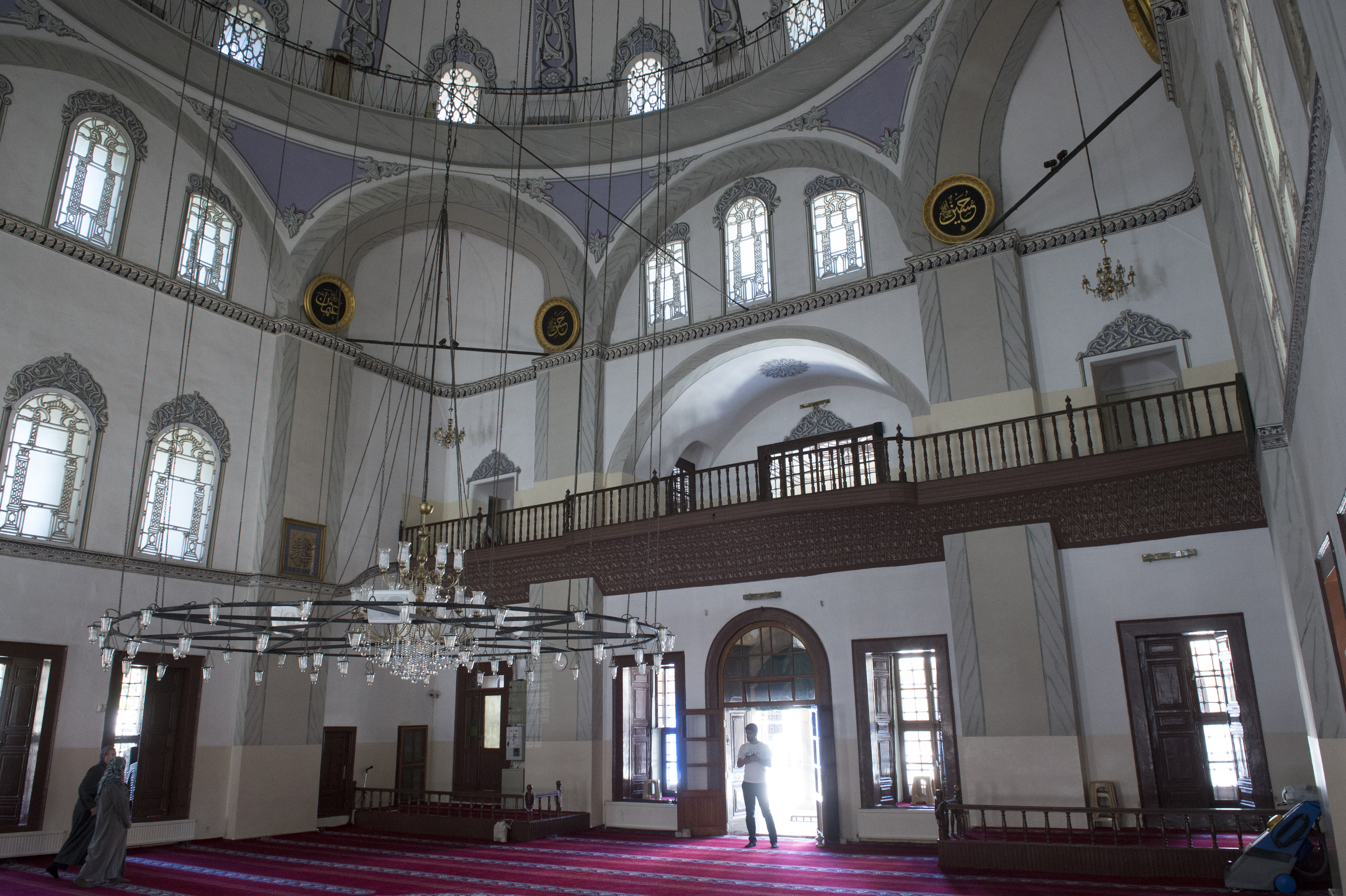
Emir Sultan Mosque: interior

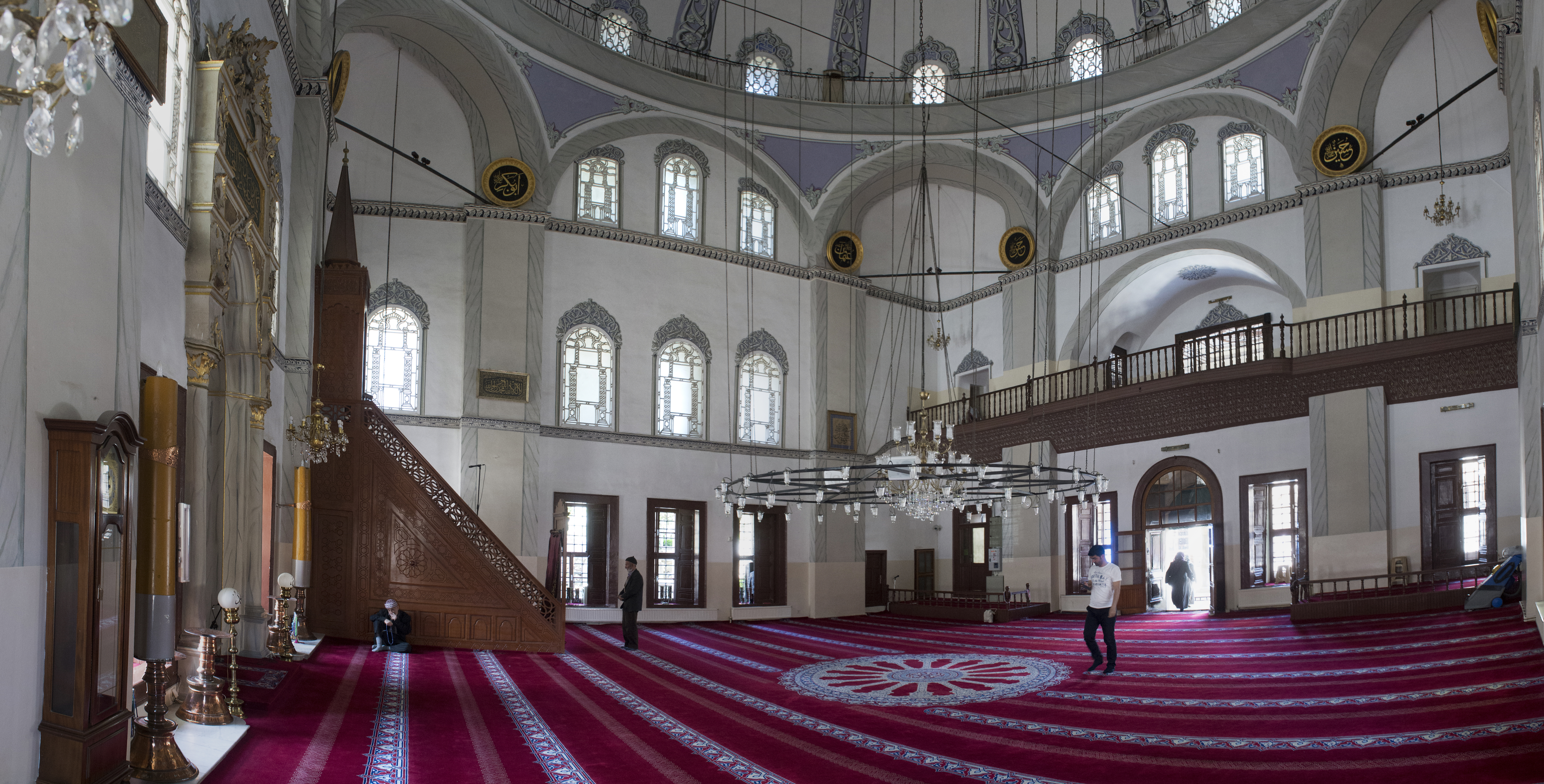
Emir Sultan Mosque: interior

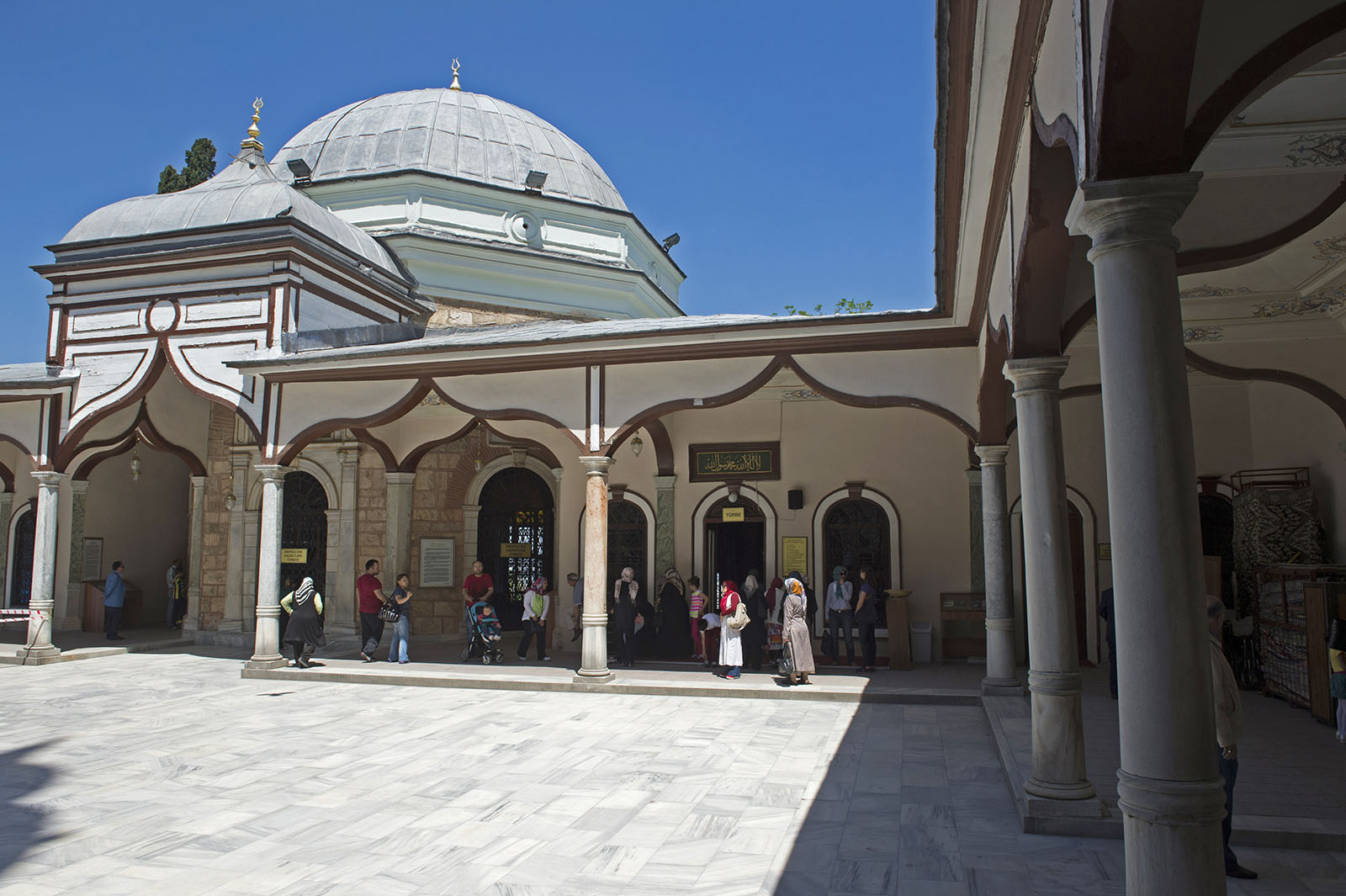
Emir Sultan Mosque: courtyard

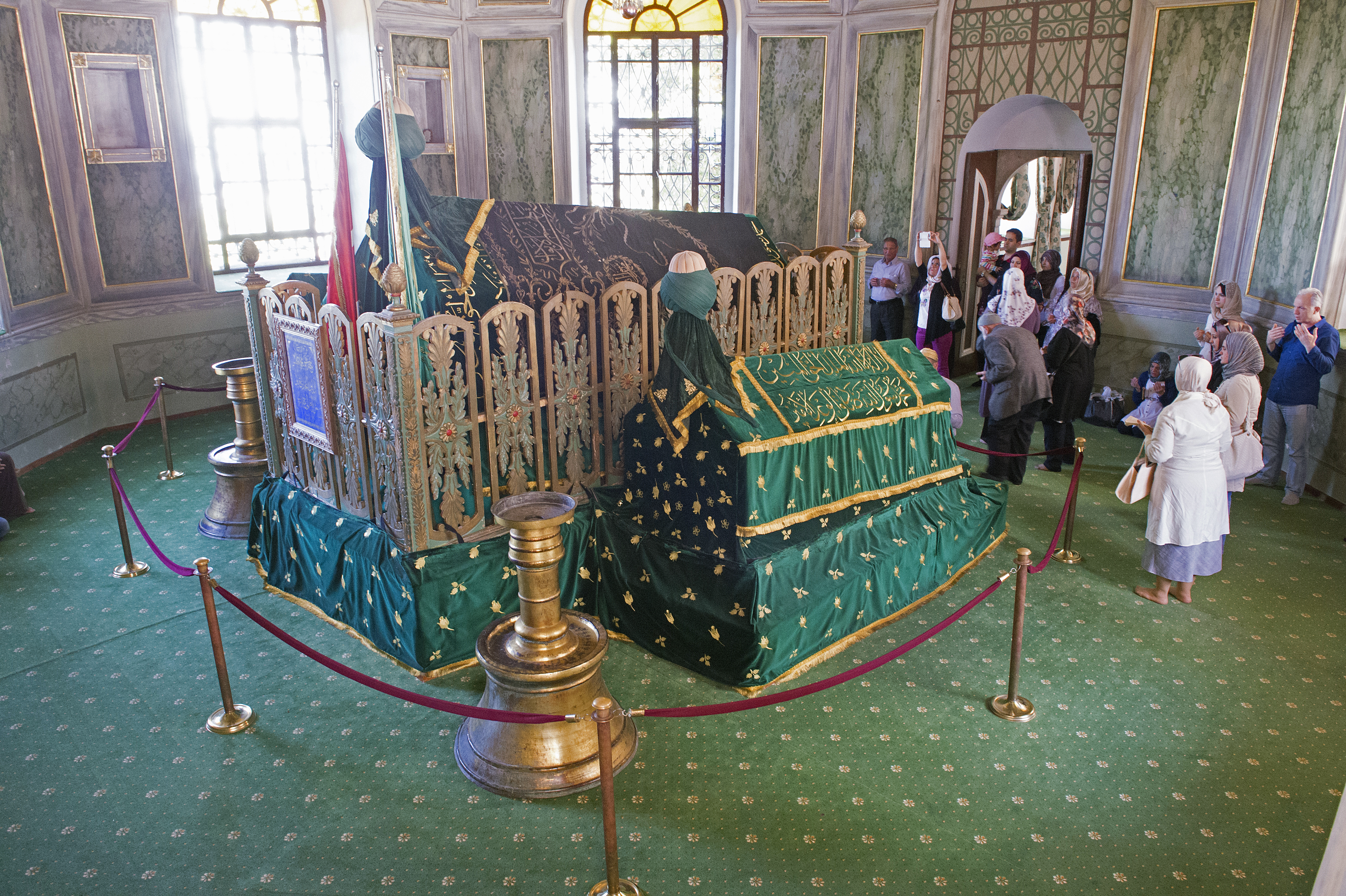
Mausoleum of Emir Sultan within mosque complex
