= Fatma Hundi Hatun =

Ottoman princess (1375–1430)

Hundi Hatun
- Princess of Ottoman Empire
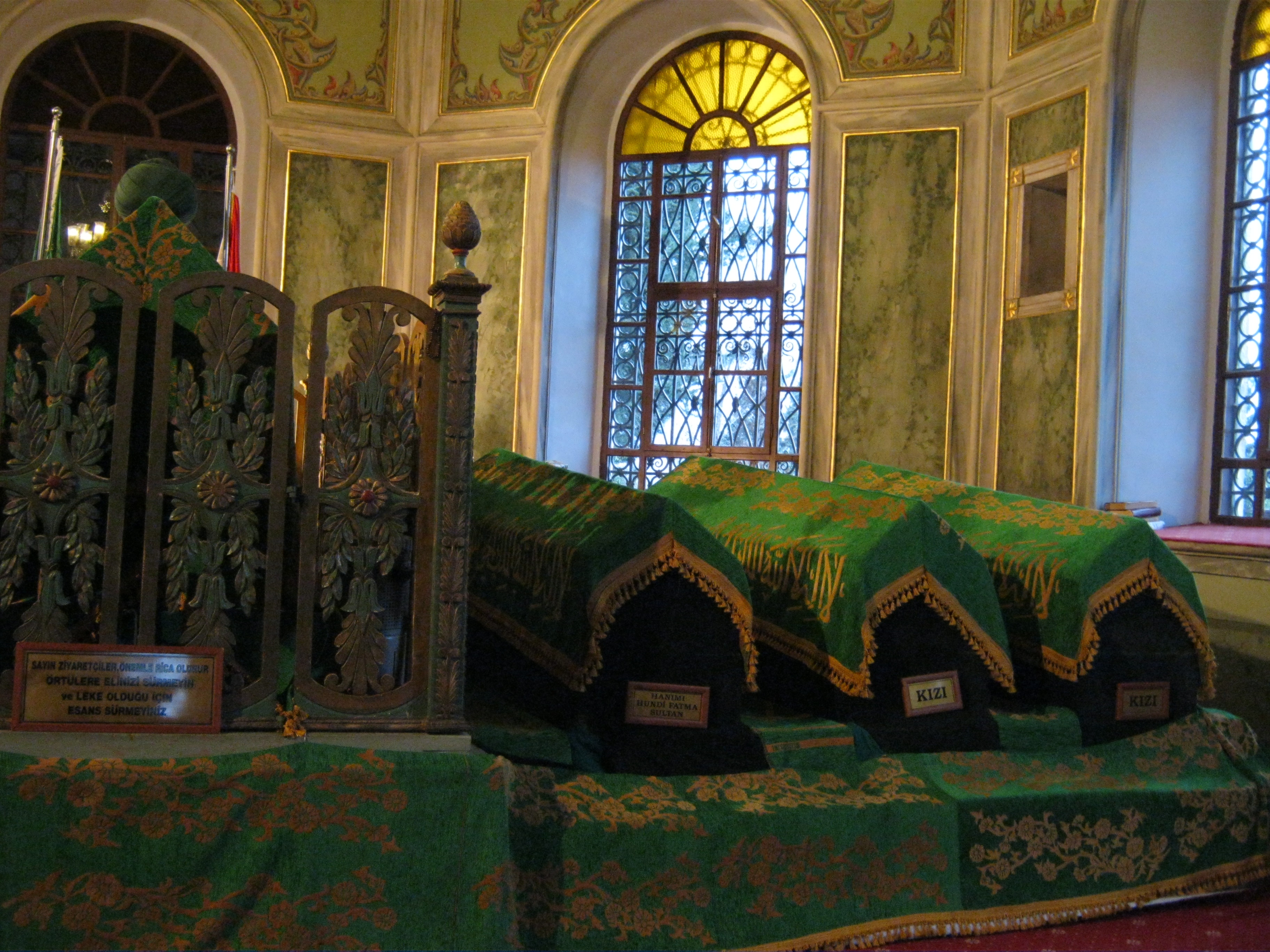
- Sarcophagus of Hundi Hatun alongside those of her daughters, her eldest son and her husband, inside the mausoleum of the Amir Sultan Mosque
- Born: c. 1375; Bursa, Ottoman Empire
- Died: c. 1430 (aged 54–55); Bursa, Ottoman Empire
- Burial: Emir Sultan Mosque, Bursa, Turkey
- Spouse: Amir Sultan (m. 1390; dead 1429)
- Issue: Emir Ali Bey; Three sons Two daughters
Names
- Fatma Hundi bin Bayezid Han
- Dynasty: Ottoman
- Father: Bayezid I

Fatma Hundi Hatun (Ottoman Turkish: فاطمه خوندی خاتون; c. 1375 - c. 1430) was an Ottoman princess, daughter of Sultan Bayezid I and wife of Amir Sultan.

== Name ==
She is known as Fatma Hundi Hatun, Hundi Hatun and Sultan Hatun. It is possible that Hundi was her birth name or that she took it after marriage and that it derives from khundat, the title of the wives of the Seljuk sultans.

== Origins ==
Fatma Hundi Hatun was born in 1375 in Bursa. Her father was Bayezid, son of the Ottoman sultan Murad I, who would become sultan in 1389. Her mother is unknown, but according to the historian Sakaoğlu, her mother may have been either Devletşah Hatun of Germiyan or the daughter of Konstantin Dragas.

In 1390, fifteen-year-old Hundi married Şemseddin Mehmed. Born in Bukhara, he was a seyyid and one of the most prominent citizens of Bursa, where he was known as Amir Bukhara. After the marriage, he became known as Amir Sultan.

== Marriage's legend ==
There is a famous legend about the marriage of Hundi and Amir.

It says that, while Bayezid was at war, he had invited Amir to stay in his palace. Here, Amir and Hundi had prophetic dreams in which Muhammad ordered them to marry. After two nights, Hundi went to Amir and said, "This marriage has already taken place in the eyes of Allah. However, according to Islamic law, legal marriage is obligatory." So the two got married in front of all the personalities of Bursa. When Bayezid discovered this, he sent Süleyman Pasha and forty men to kill Amir and the wedding witnesses, but they failed due to a series of miracles. Then, Molla Fenari, qadi of Bursa, wrote to Bayezid that the marriage was wanted by Allah and that Amir was a worthy son-in-law. So Bayezid accepted the marriage and reconciled with his daughter and Amir.

== Historical analyzes ==
There are two main historical analyzes of marriage.

According to the first, the marriage was arranged by Bayezid himself and not behind his back. Bayezid respected Amir and wanted him as a son-in-law, and he knew that he and Hundi loved each other, so he arranged the wedding.

In the second, Amir took advantage of Bayezid's absence to seduce Hundi and kidnap her. To save the girl's reputation, Molla Fenari legally married them and then convinced Bayezid to give his blessing by inventing the miracles that saved Amir.

Hundi and Amir's marriage is the only one known between an Ottoman princess and a seyyid and is the only one that could have taken place without the consent of the bride's relatives. The derived legend is considered the last of Ottoman mythology, which began with Osman's Dream.

== Later years and death ==
After the wedding, the couple settled in Bursa and had four sons and two daughters. Hundi was widowed in 1429, when her husband and probably at least some of her children died during a plague epidemic.

She herself died the following year, in 1430, of plague or grief. She was buried with her husband and children in the Emir Sultan Mosque in Bursa.

== Issue ==
From her marriage, Hundi Hatun had four sons, including Emir Ali Bey, and two twin daughters. All her children predeceased her and were buried with their parents in Bursa.
