= Bayezid I Mosque =

Mosque in Bursa, Turkey

- Yıldırım Bayezid Camii
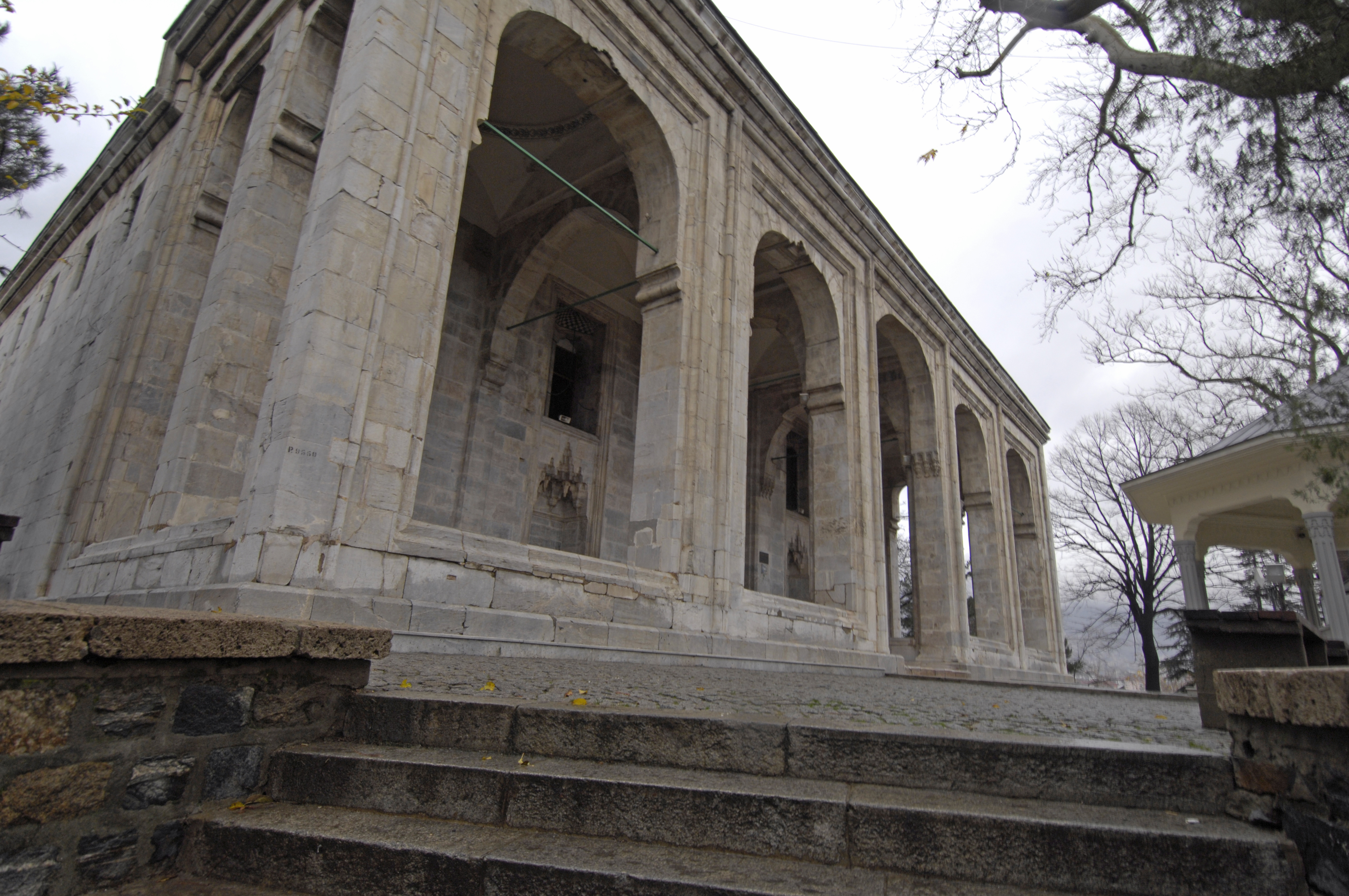

- Location of the mosque in Turkey.

Religion
- Affiliation: Islam

Location
- Location: Bursa, Turkey
- Coordinates: 40°11′15″N 29°04′57″E

Architecture
- Type: Mosque
- Style: Islamic, Ottoman architecture
- Groundbreaking: 1391
- Completed: 1395; 631 years ago

Specifications
- Interior area: 5,000 m^{2} (54,000 sq ft)
- Minaret: 2
- Location within Turkey

UNESCO World Heritage Site
- Part of: Bursa and Cumalıkızık: the Birth of the Ottoman Empire
- Criteria: Cultural: (i), (ii), (iv), (vi)
- Reference: 1452-005
- Inscription: 2014 (38th Session)

Bayezid I Mosque (Turkish: Yıldırım Camii or Yıldırım Bayezid Camii) is a historic mosque in Bursa, Turkey, that is part of the large complex (külliye) built by the Ottoman Sultan Bayezid I (Yıldırım Bayezid – Bayezid the Thunderbolt) between 1391–1395. It is situated in Bursa metropolitan district of Yıldırım, also named after the same sultan. It underwent extensive renovation following the 1855 Bursa earthquake.

== Architecture ==
The mosque comprises a central hall with a large dome flanked by eyvans on the east and west with smaller domes and another large domed eyvan with mihrab on the south.

There are four rooms with fireplaces and cupboards to the north and south of side of the eyvans. The southern rooms are accessed directly from the central hall while the northern rooms are accessed thought small vestibules. Each northern room also contains two niches on the sides that are accessed through the vestibules. The entrance hall of the mosque features high domed ceilings. The last prayer section (semi-open section of the mosque at the north end) is built with five sub-sections and each subsection is covered with an individual dome.

In the Yıldırım Camii, all three eyvans were built three steps higher than the central hall. Yıldırım Camii was the first structure where a Bursa Arch was implemented. This flattened arch is located in between the central hall and south eyvan and connects and supports the two large domes. There are two minarets on the sides of the mosque. Unlike similar mosques of its time in Bursa, Yıldırım Camii was constructed entirely out of dimension stones and bricks were not used in any part of the mosque.

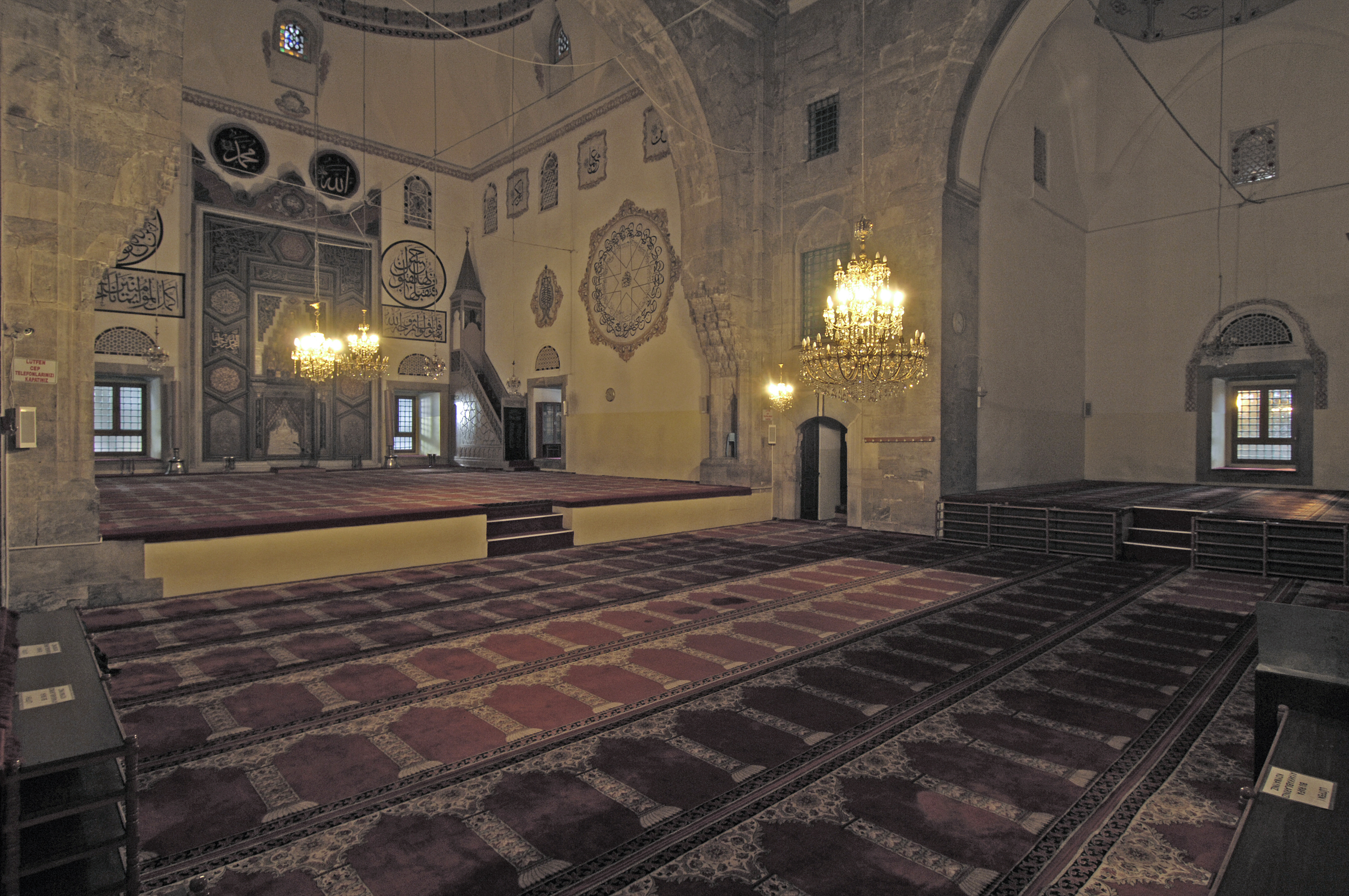
Interior

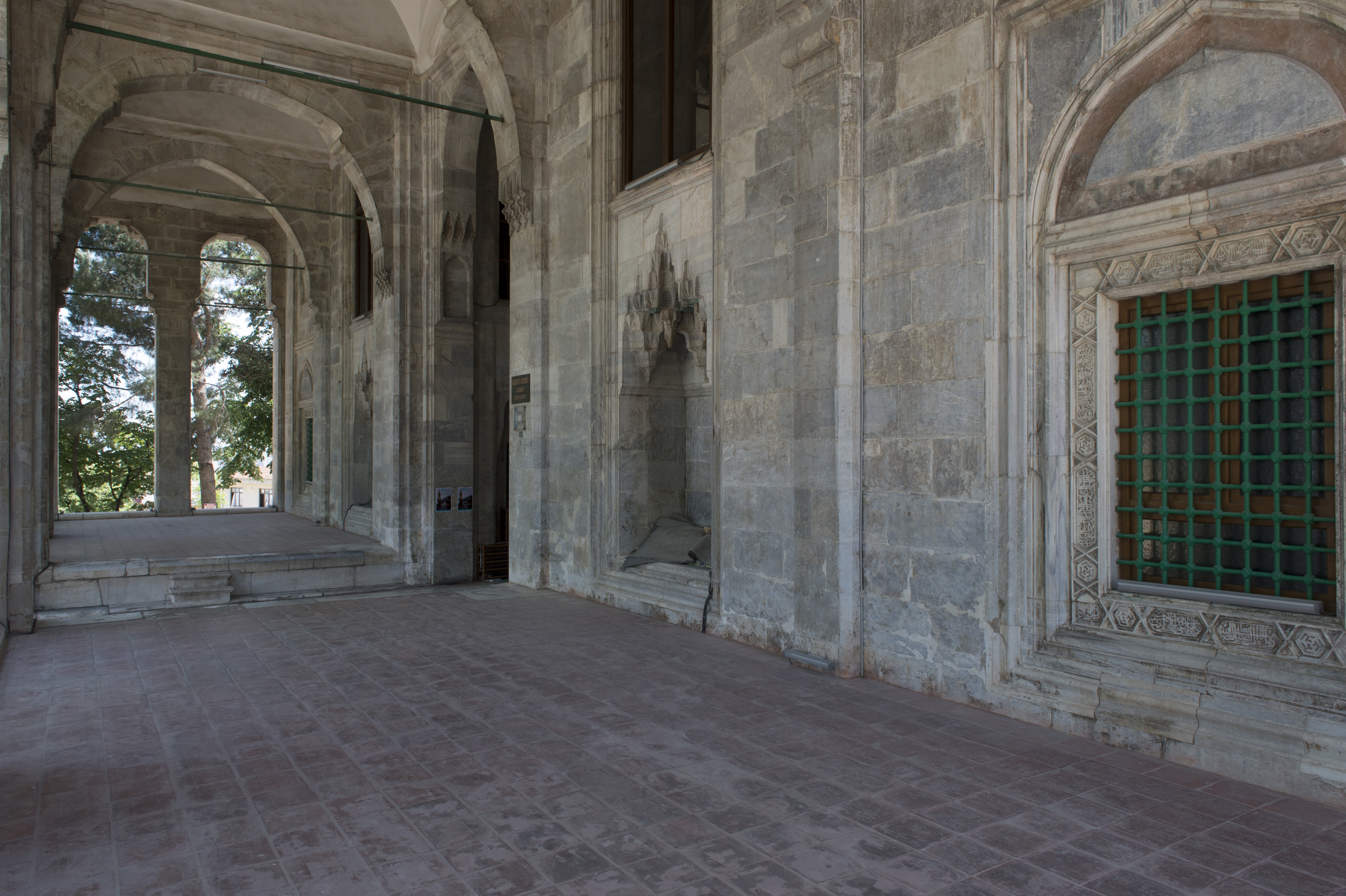
last prayer section (semi-open section of the mosque at the north end)

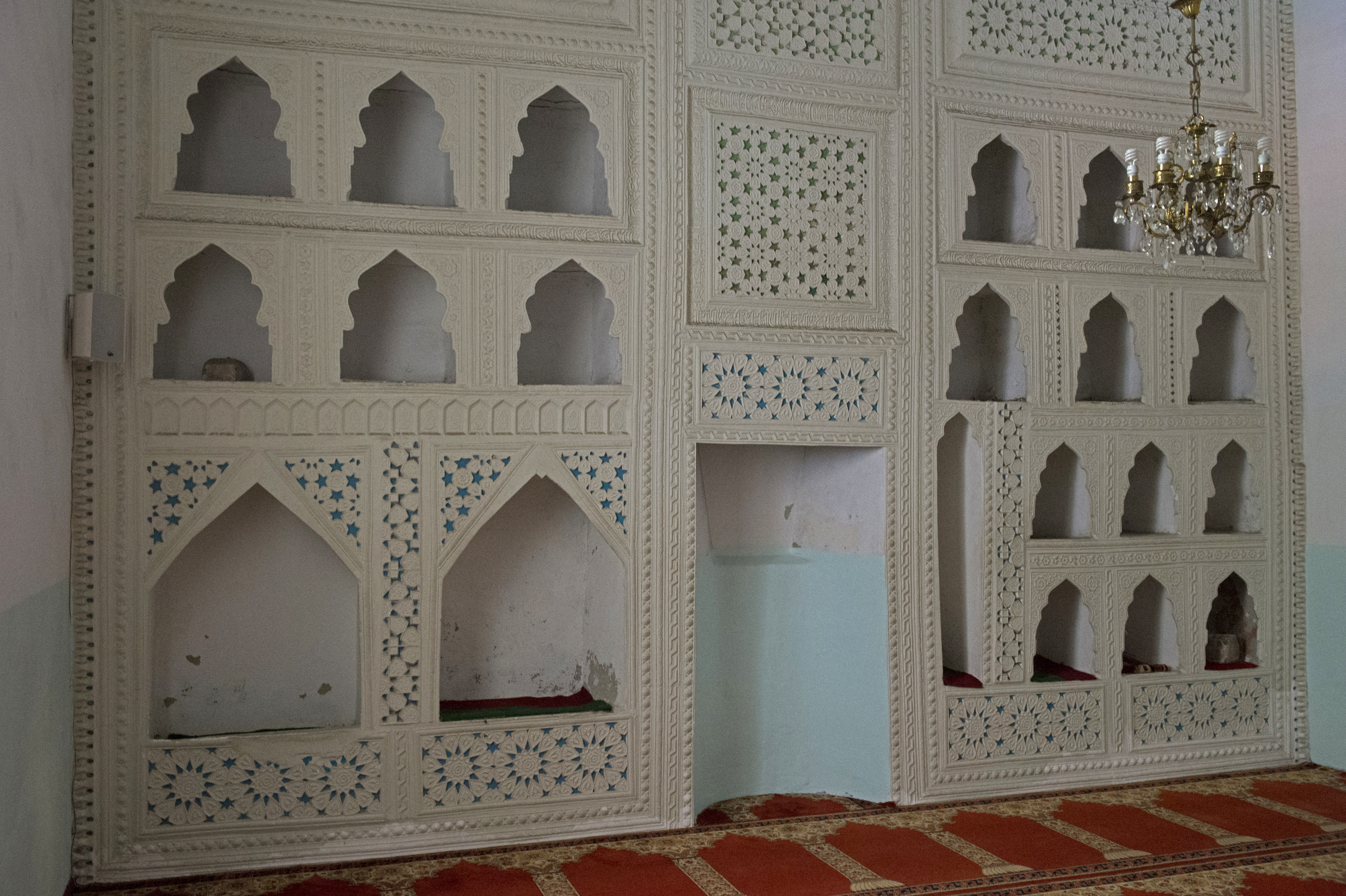
Side room

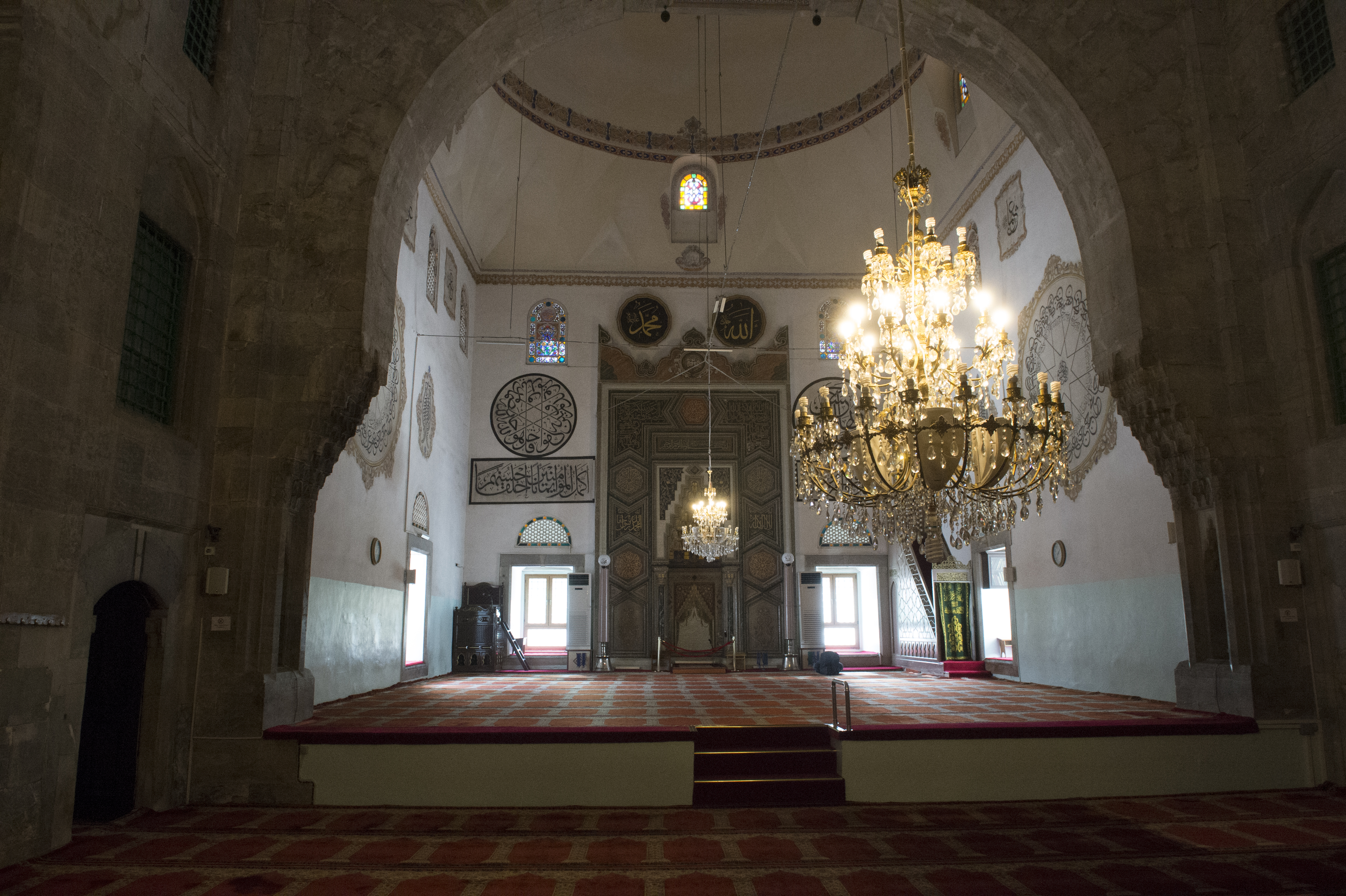
View towards the central eyvan with minber and mihrab

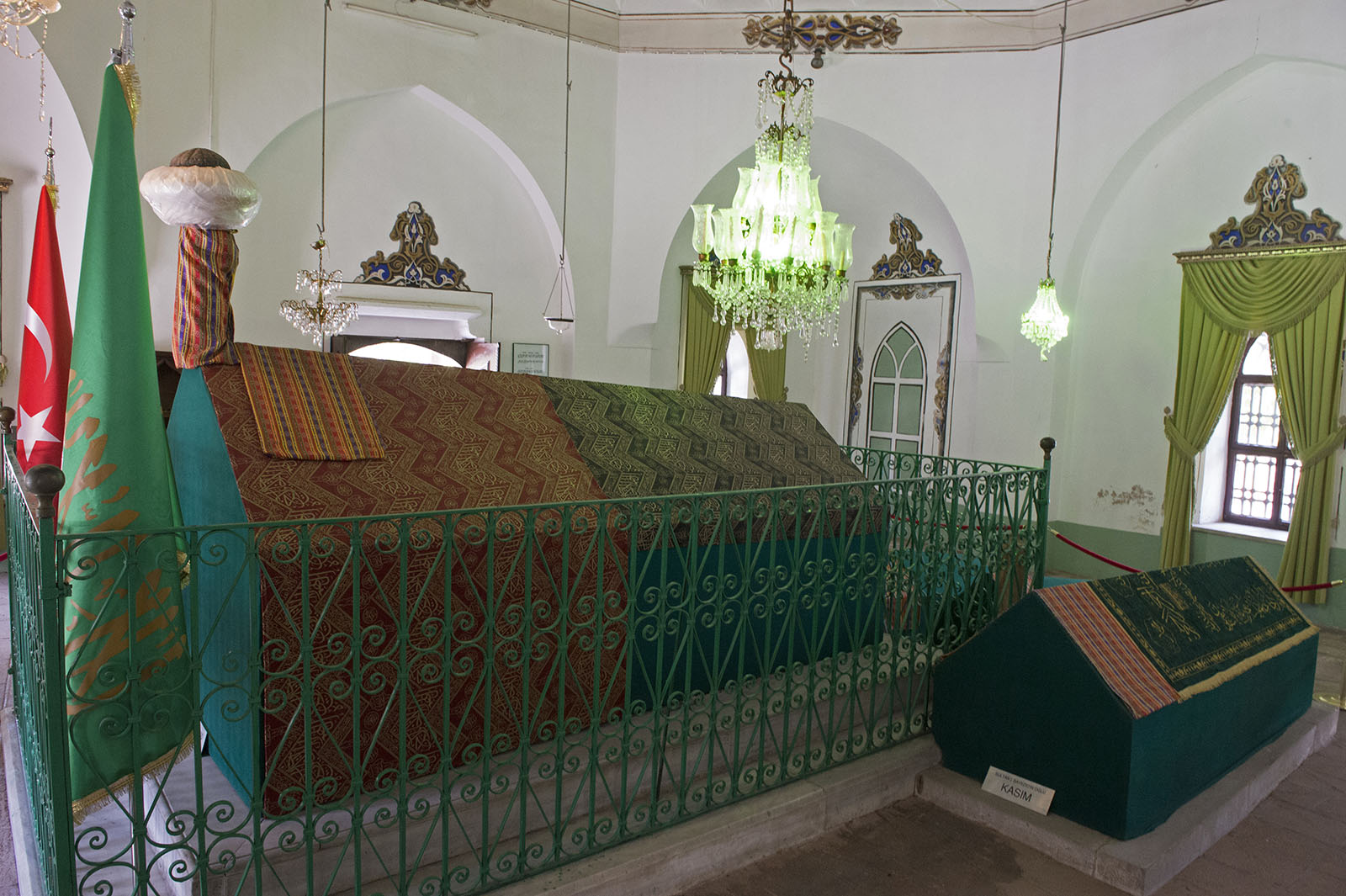
As part of the complex: the mausoleum
