= Bayezid I =

Sultan of the Ottoman Empire from 1389 to 1402

- Sultan of Rum
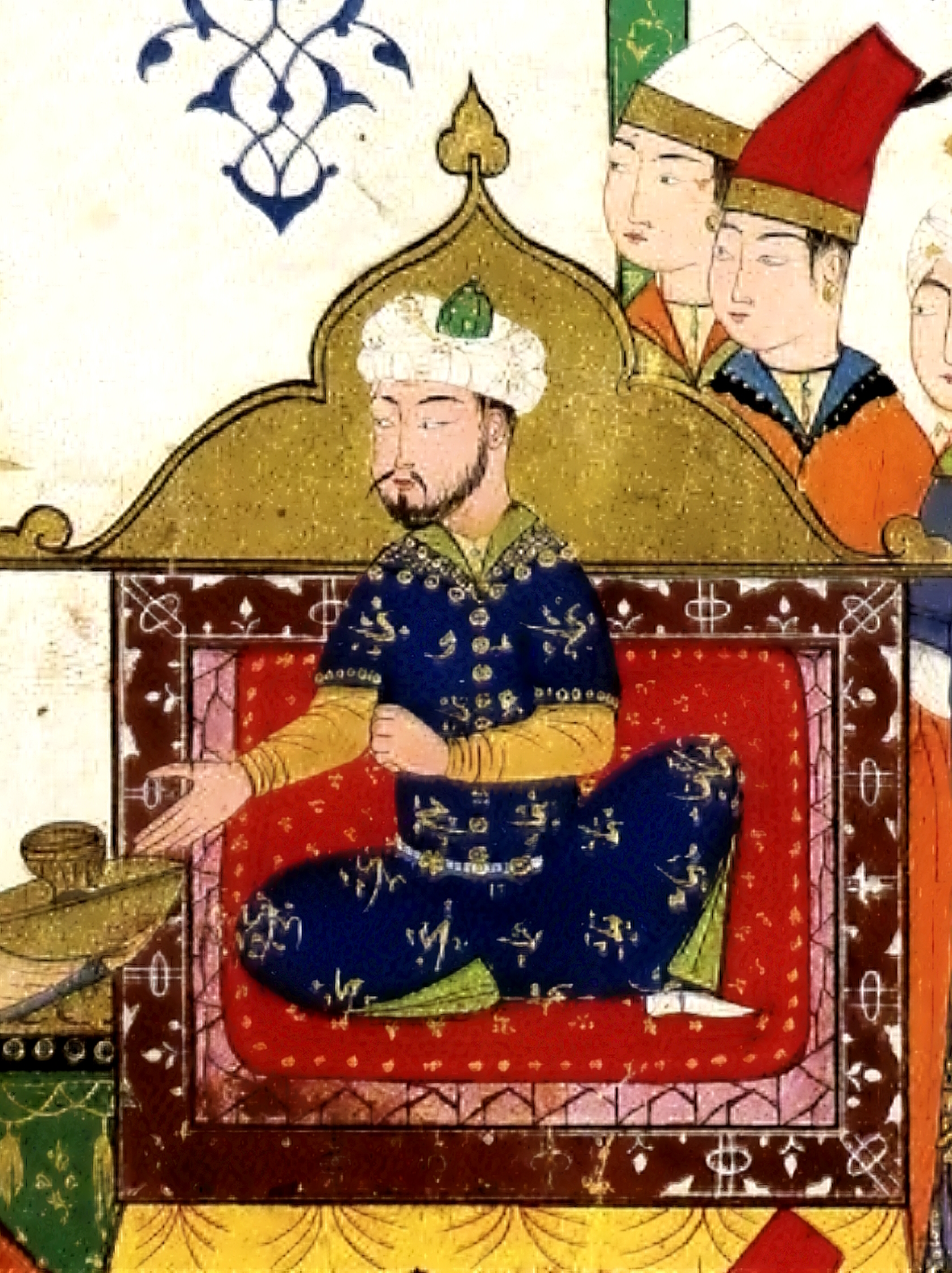
- Accession of Bayezid I in the Iskendername manuscript Biblioteca Nazionale Marciana, cod. or. 90 (c. 1460)

Sultan of the Ottoman Sultanate (Padishah)
- Reign: 16 June 1389 – 20 July 1402
- Predecessor: Murad I
- Successor: Interregnum (1402 – 1413): Süleyman Çelebi (1402–1411); İsa Çelebi (1403); Musa Çelebi (1411–1413); Mehmed I
- Born: c. 1360; Ottoman Beylik
- Died: 8 March 1403 (aged 42–43); Akşehir, then under Timurid occupation
- Burial: Bayezid I Mosque, Bursa
- Consorts: Devletşah Sultan Hatun; Devlet Hatun; Olivera Despina Lazarević; Hafsa Hatun; Maria Fadrique; Angelina of Greece
- Issue Among others: Fatma Hundi Hatun; Ertuğrul Çelebi; Süleyman Çelebi; İsa Çelebi; Musa Çelebi; Mustafa Çelebi; Mehmed I Yusuf Çelebi
Names
- Bayezid bin Murad Han
- Dynasty: Ottoman
- Father: Murad I
- Mother: Gülçiçek Hatun
- Religion: Sunni Islam
- Tughra
- Military career
- Conflicts: See list: Bulgarian–Ottoman wars; Siege of Tarnovo; Battle of Nicopolis; Battle of Kosovo; Battle of Frenkyazısı (1387); Fall of Philadelphia; Battle of Rovine; Conquest of Thessaly; Siege of Constantinople (1394–1402); Hungarian–Ottoman War (1389–1396); Bayezid I's Anatolian Campaigns; First Anatolian Campaign; First Karamanid' Campaign; Second Anatolian' Campaign; Battle of Akçay; Capture of Karamanids; Capture of Samsun; Capture of the State of Kadi Burhan al-Din; Expedition to the Mamluk Sultanate; Expedition to the Emirate of Erzincan; Capture of Chrysopolis; Capture of Thessaloniki; Battle of Argesh; Battle of Ankara (POW)

Bayezid I (Ottoman Turkish: بايزيد اول; Turkish: I. Bayezid), also known as Bayezid the Thunderbolt (Ottoman Turkish: یلدیرم بايزيد; Turkish: Yıldırım Bayezid; c. 1360 – 8 March 1403), was the sultan of the Ottoman Empire from 1389 to 1402. He adopted the title of Sultan-i Rûm, Rûm being the Arabic name for the Eastern Roman Empire. In 1394, Bayezid unsuccessfully besieged Constantinople. Two years later, he defeated the crusaders at the Battle of Nicopolis in what is now Bulgaria in 1396. Bayezid vanquished all the Anatolian beyliks and proceeded to conquer and vassalize the entirety of Anatolia. In 1402, he once more besieged Constantinople, appearing to find success, but he ultimately withdrew due to the invasion of the Turco-Mongol conqueror Timur. Bayezid was defeated and captured by Timur at the Battle of Ankara in 1402 and died in captivity in March 1403, which triggered the Ottoman Interregnum between his sons.

== Biography ==
Bayezid was the son of Murad I and his Greek wife, Gülçiçek Hatun. His first major role was as governor of Kütahya, a city that he earned by marrying the daughter of a Germiyanid ruler, Devletşah. He was an impetuous soldier, earning the nickname "Thunderbolt" in a battle against the Karamanids.

Bayezid ascended to the throne following the death of his father, Murad I, who was killed by Serbian knight Miloš Obilić during (15 June), or immediately after (16 June), the Battle of Kosovo in 1389, soon after which Serbia became a vassal of the Ottoman Sultanate. Immediately after obtaining the throne, he had his younger brother strangled to avoid a plot. In 1390, Bayezid took as a wife Princess Olivera Despina, the daughter of Prince Lazar of Serbia, who also lost his life in Kosovo. Bayezid recognized Stefan Lazarević, the son of Lazar, as the new Serbian leader (later despot) with considerable autonomy.

Upper Serbia resisted the Ottomans until Bayezid captured Skopje in 1391, converting the city into an important base of operations.

== Efforts to unify Anatolia ==
Meanwhile, Bayezid began unifying Anatolia under his rule. Forcible expansion into Muslim territories could have endangered the Ottoman relationship with the gazis, who were an important source of warriors for this ruling house on the European frontier. Thus Bayezid began the practice of first securing fatwas, or legal rulings from Islamic scholars, to justify wars against these Muslim states. However, Bayezid doubted the loyalty of his Muslim Turkish followers, so he relied heavily on his Serbian and Byzantine vassal troops in these conquests.

In a single campaign over the summer and fall of 1390, Bayezid conquered the beyliks of Aydin, Saruhan and Menteshe. His major rival Sulayman, the emir of Karaman, responded by allying himself with the ruler of Sivas, Kadi Burhan al-Din and the remaining Turkish beyliks. Nevertheless, Bayezid pushed on and overwhelmed the remaining beyliks (Hamid, Teke, and Germiyan), as well as taking the cities of Akşehir and Niğde, as well as their capital Konya from the Karaman. At this point, Bayezid accepted peace proposals from Karaman (1391), concerned that further advances would antagonize his Turkoman followers and lead them to ally with Kadi Burhan al-Din. Once peace had been made with Karaman, Bayezid moved north against Kastamonu which had given refuge to many fleeing from his forces, and conquered both that city as well as Sinop. However, his subsequent campaign was stopped by Burhan al-Din at the Battle of Kırkdilim.

From 1389 to 1395 he conquered Bulgaria and Northern Greece. In 1394 Bayezid crossed the River Danube to attack Wallachia, ruled at that time by Mircea the Elder. The Ottomans were superior in number, but on 10 October 1394 (or 17 May 1395), in the Battle of Rovine, on forested and swampy terrain, the Wallachians won the fierce battle and prevented Bayezid's army from advancing beyond the Danube.

In 1394, Bayezid laid siege to Constantinople, the capital of the Byzantine Empire. Anadoluhisarı fortress was built between 1393 and 1394 as part of preparations for the second Ottoman siege of Constantinople, which took place in 1395. On the urgings of the Byzantine emperor Manuel II Palaeologus, a new crusade was organized to defeat him. This proved unsuccessful: in 1396 the Christian allies, under the leadership of the King of Hungary and future Holy Roman Emperor (in 1433) Sigismund, were defeated in the Battle of Nicopolis. Bayezid built the magnificent Ulu Cami in Bursa, to celebrate this victory.

Thus the siege of Constantinople continued, lasting until 1402. The beleaguered Byzantines had their reprieve when Bayezid fought the Timurid Empire in the east. At this time, the empire of Bayezid included Thrace (except Constantinople), Macedonia, Bulgaria, and parts of Serbia in Europe. In Asia, his domains extended to the Taurus Mountains. His army was considered one of the best in the Islamic world.

== Clash with Timur ==
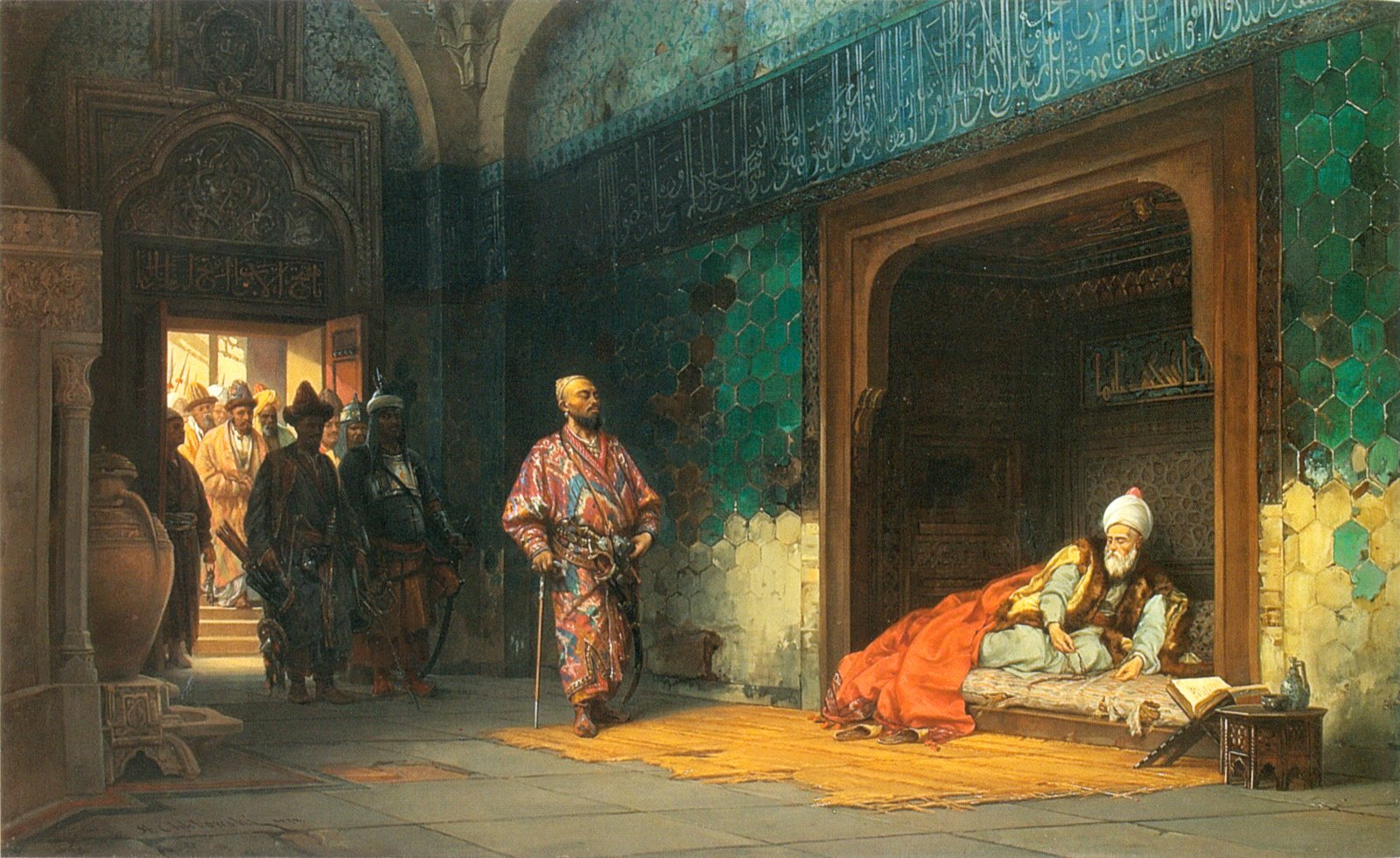
Bayezid I held captive by Timur, painting by Stanisław Chlebowski (1878)

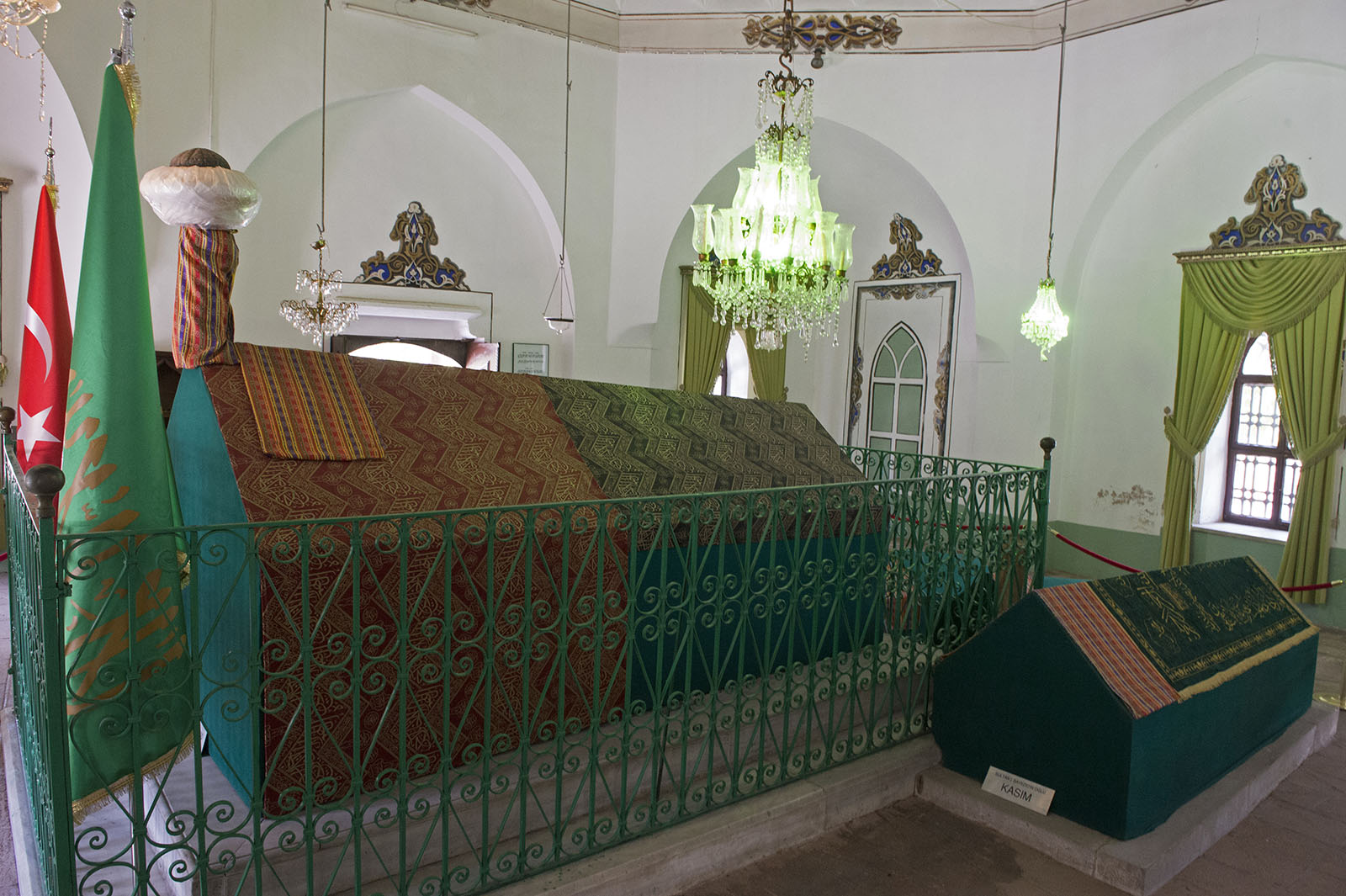
Bayezid's türbe (tomb) at Bayezid I Mosque

In 1397, Bayezid defeated the emir of Karaman in Akçay, killing him and annexing his territory. In 1398, the sultan conquered the Djanik emirate and the territory of Burhan al-Din, violating the accord with the Turco-Mongol emir Timur. Finally, Bayezid occupied Elbistan and Malatya.

In 1400, Timur succeeded in rousing the local Turkic beyliks who had been vassals of the Ottomans to join him in his attack on Bayezid, who was also considered one of the most powerful rulers in the Muslim world during that period. Years of insulting letters had passed between Timur and Bayezid. Both rulers insulted each other in their own way while Timur preferred to undermine Bayezid's position as a ruler and play down the significance of his military successes.

This is the excerpt from one of Timur's letters addressed to the Ottoman sultan:

Believe me, you are but pismire ant: don't seek to fight the elephants for they'll crush you under their feet. Shall a petty prince such as you are contend with us? But your rodomontades [braggadocio] are not extraordinary; for a Turcoman never spoke with judgement. If you don't follow our counsels you will regret it.

In the fateful Battle of Ankara, on 20 July 1402, the Ottoman army was defeated. Bayazid tried to escape, but was captured and taken to Timur. Historians describe their first meeting as follows:

When Timur saw Bayezid, he laughed. Bayezid, offended by this laugh, told Timur that it was indecent to laugh at misfortune; to which Timur replied: "It is clear then that fate does not value power and possession of vast lands if it distributes them to cripples: to you, the crooked, and to me, the lame."

Many writers claim that Bayezid was mistreated by the Timurids. However, writers and historians from Timur's own court reported that Bayezid was treated well, and that Timur even mourned his death. One of Bayezid's sons, Mustafa Çelebi, was captured with him and held captive in Samarkand until 1405.

Four of Bayezid's sons, specifically Süleyman Çelebi, İsa Çelebi, Mehmed Çelebi, and Musa Çelebi, however, escaped from the battlefield and later started a civil war for the Ottoman throne known as the Ottoman Interregnum. After Mehmed's victory, his coronation as Mehmed I, and the deaths of the other three, Bayezid's other son Mustafa Çelebi emerged from hiding and began two failed rebellions against his brother Mehmed and, after Mehmed's death, his nephew Murad II.

== Life under Timurid captivity and death ==
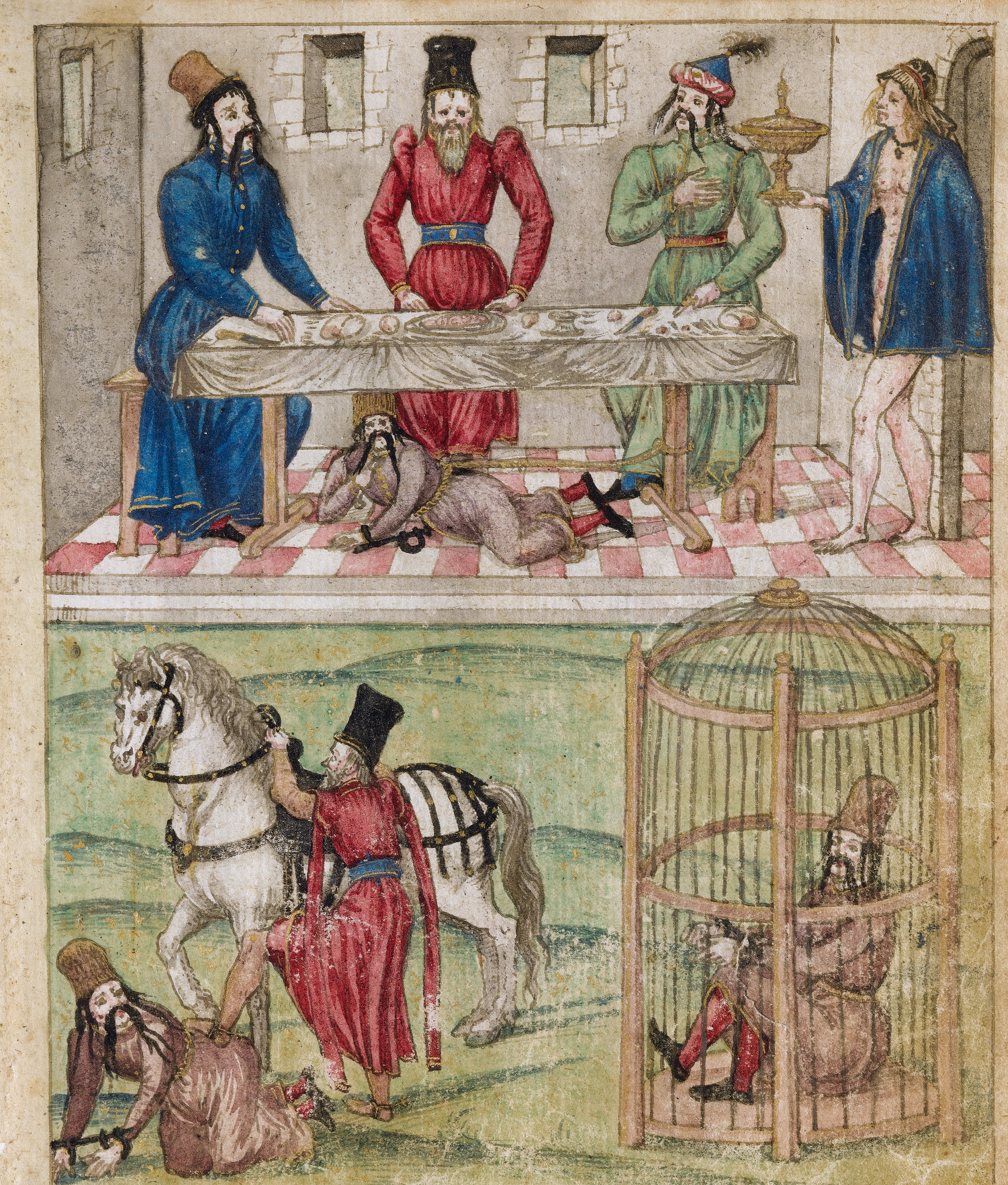
Bayezid's supposed humiliation; his wife Olivera is semi-naked at Timur's banquet. (German album amicorum, 16th century)

In Europe, the legend of Bayezid's humiliation in captivity was very popular. He was allegedly chained, and forced to watch how his beloved wife, Olivera, served Timur at dinner. According to a legend, Timur took Bayezid with himself everywhere in a barred palanquin or cage, humiliating him in various ways, used Bayezid as a support under his legs, and at dinner had him placed under the table where bones were thrown at him.

Different versions on Bayezid's death existed, too. One of them mentioned the suicide of Bayezid. Allegedly, the Sultan committed suicide through hitting his head against the bars of his cell or taking poison. The version was promoted by Ottoman historians: Lutfi Pasha, Ashik Pasha-Zade. There was also a version where Bayezid was supposedly poisoned on Timur's order. This is considered unlikely, because there is evidence that the Turco-Mongol ruler entrusted the care of Bayezid to his personal doctors.

In the descriptions of contemporaries and witnesses of the events, neither a cell nor humiliation is mentioned.

=== Early accounts ===
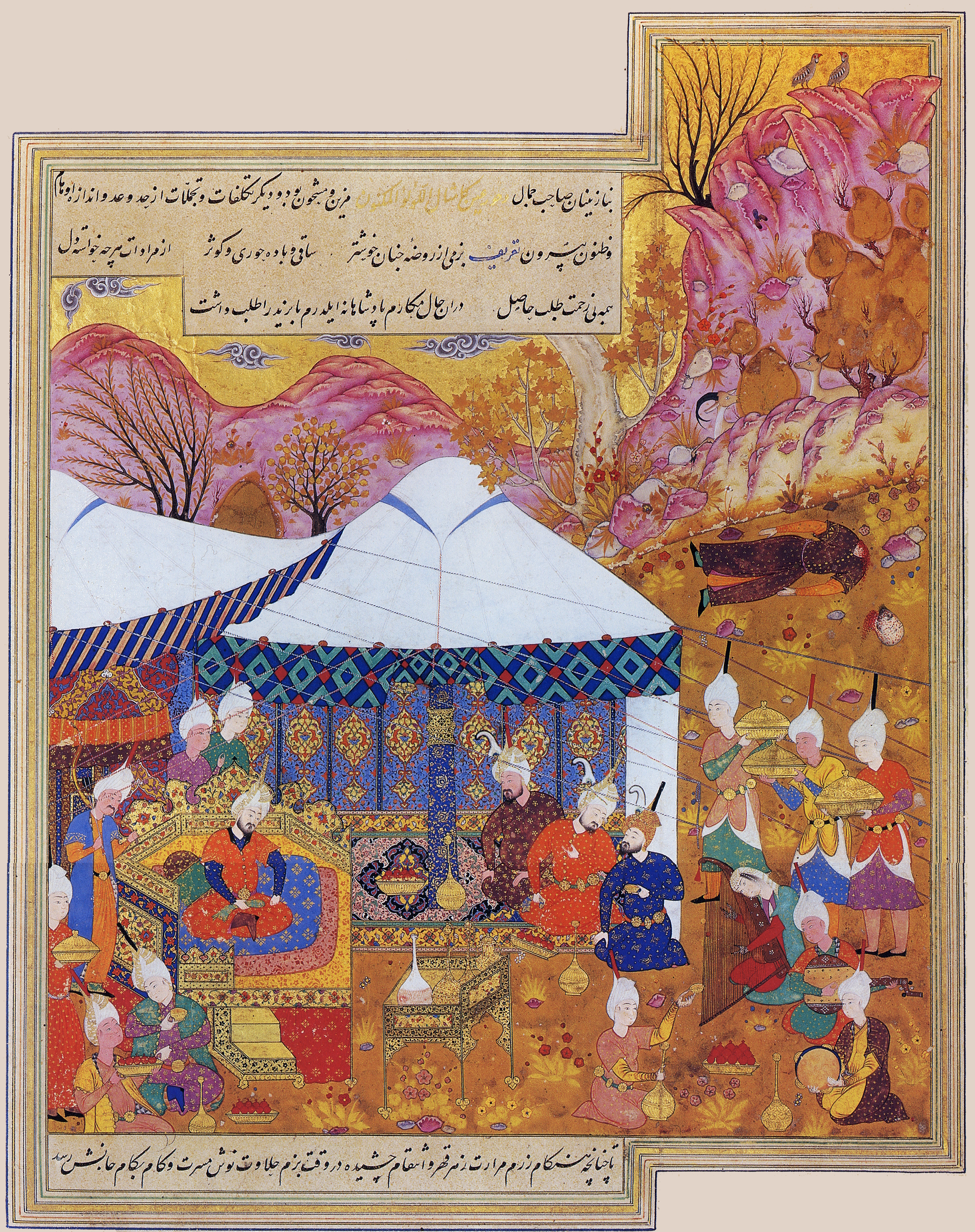
Festivities with Bayezid as prisoner, after conquering Rum territories. Zafarnama, 1528 (Golestan, MS 708).

German traveller and writer Johann Schiltberger did not write anything about the cell, bars or violent death. Another contemporary, Jean II Le Maingre, who witnessed Bayezid's captivity, wrote nothing about the cell or poisoning either. Clavijo, who came to Timur's court in 1404 as part of the embassy and visited Constantinople on his return trip, also did not mention the cell. All Greek sources of the first decade of the 15th century are equally silent about the cell. Sharafaddin Yazdi (d. 1454) in Zafar-nama wrote that Bayezid was treated with respect, and at his request, Turco-Mongols found his son among the captives and brought him to his father. Scene of festivities with Bayezid as prisoner were reported and depicted in miniatures. Regarding Bayezid's wife, Sharafaddin wrote that Timur sent her and his daughters to her husband. Olivera allegedly became a Muslim under the influence of Timur.

First references to a disrespectful attitude towards Bayazid appear in the works of ibn Arabshah (1389–1450) and Constantine of Ostrovica. Ibn Arabshah wrote that "Bayezid's heart was broken to pieces" when he saw that his wives and concubines were serving at a banquet.

Ibn Arabshah wrote the following about the captivity of Bayezid:

Ibn Usman became a prey and was locked up like a bird in a cage.

However, this is just a "flowery style", and not a real cell. According to literary historian H.A.R. Gibb, "the flowery elegance of style has also affected historiography. Most of the authors of the Timurid era succumbed to its influence ."

Constantine of Ostrovica wrote neither about the cell, nor about the nudity of Bayezid's wife; though he did write that Bayezid committed suicide. In the story of Constantine, just like in that of ibn Arabshah, the sultan was so struck by the fact that his wife carried wine to a feast that he poisoned himself with a poison from his ring.

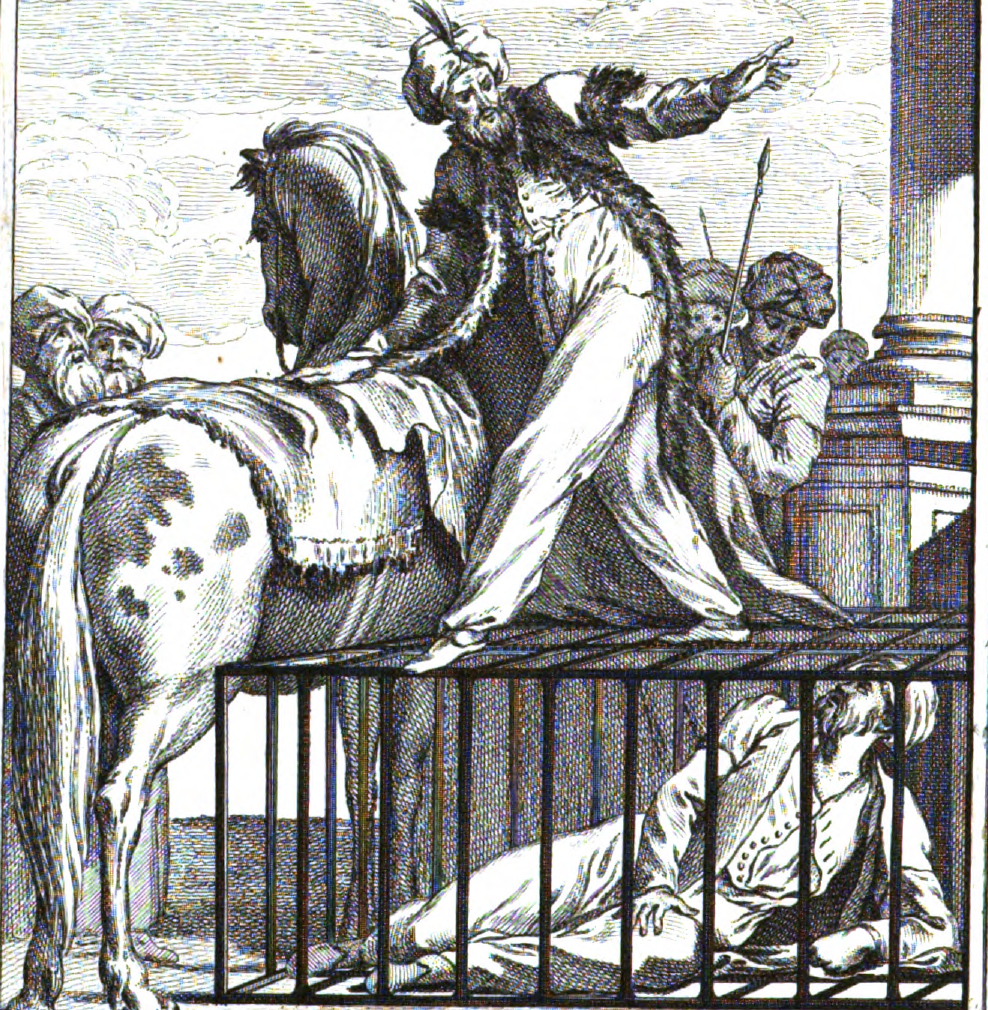
Bayezid in the cage, 1746

Ottoman historian Mehmed Neshri (1450–1520) described Bayezid's imprisonment and mentioned the cell twice. According to him, Timur asked Bayezid what he would do in Timur's place with regard to the captive. "I would have planted him in an iron cage," Bayezid answered. To which Timur replied: "This is a bad answer." He ordered to prepare the cage and the Sultan was put into it.

The complete set of legends may perhaps be found in the work of Pope Pius II Asiae Europaeque elegantissima descriptio, written in 1450–1460 (published in 1509): Bayezid is kept in a cage, fed with garbage under the table, Timur uses Bayezid as a support to get on or off a horse. Further development can be found in later authors, such as Theodore Spandounes. The first version of his story was written in Italian and completed in 1509, and a French translation was published in 1519. In these versions of the text, Spandounes wrote only about the golden chains and that the sultan was used as a stand. Spandounes added the cell only in later versions of the text. Later versions of the text also include a description of the public humiliation of Bayezid's wife:

He had a wife of Ildrim [Yıldırım, i.e., Bayezid], who was also a captive. They ripped off her clothes to the navel, exposing shameful areas. And he (Timur) made her serve food to him and his guests like that.

== Family ==
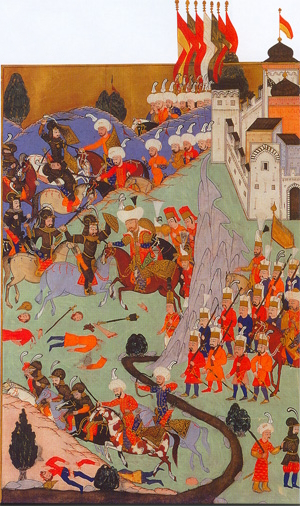
The Battle of Nicopolis, as depicted by an Ottoman Turkish miniaturist in 1588

=== Consorts ===
Bayezid I had at least nine consorts:

- Fülane Hatun. Daughter of Konstantin of Kostendil, she married Bayezid in 1372 while her older sister married Murad I and another sister married Yakub Çelebi, son of Murad and half-brother of Bayezid.
- Devletşah Sultan Hatun (c. 1365 - 23 January 1414). Daughter of Süleyman of Germiyan and Mutahhare Abide Hatun, great-granddaughter of Rumi, she married Bayezid in 1378. She was the mother of İsa Çelebi and Musa Çelebi
- A daughter of John V Palaiologos and Helena Kantakouzene. She married Bayezid in 1386.
- Devlet Hatun (died in 1422). Slave concubine, mother of Mehmed I.
- Maria Olivera Despina Hatun (1372 – 1444). Serbian princess, daughter of Prince Lazar of Serbia and Princess Milica, she married Bayezid in 1390. She was the Bayezid's favorite consort, but was extremely unpopular with the Ottomans court and people: she was accused of bribing the sultan and introducing alcohol to the court. She was captured by Timur together with her husband.
- Hafsa Hatun. Daughter of Fahreddin Isa Bey of the Aydinids, she married Bayezid in 1390.
- Maria Fadrique (1370 - 1394). Daughter of Louis Fadrique and Helena Asanina Kantakuzene, she entered in Bayezid's harem between 1393 and 1394. She died, maybe executed, in 1394.
- Angelina Hatun (1380 - 1440). Daughter of the Hungarian count János (Juan), was freed by Timur and handed over to Henry III of Castile. She later married Diego González de Contreras.
- Maria Hatun. Angelina's sister, she was freed by Timur and handed over to Henry III of Castile. She later married Payo González de Soto Mayor.

=== Sons ===
Bayezid I had at least twelve sons:

- Ertuğrul Çelebi (May 1376 –1400), wali of Aydin. He was born in Küthaya. He took part in the Candar campaign and fought in the Battle of Kirkdilim, on 20 July 1391. He died of unknown causes and was buried in Bursa.
- Süleyman Çelebi (1377 - 1411). Emir of Rumelia, claimant to the Ottoman throne during the Ottoman Interregnum.
- İsa Çelebi (1380 - 1403) – with Devletşah Hatun. Governor of Anatolia, claimant to the Ottoman throne during the Ottoman Interregnum.
- Mustafa Çelebi (1380 – 1402 or 1422?). Claimant to the Ottoman throne during Mehmed I and Murad II's reigns.
- Musa Çelebi (died in 1413) – with Devletşah Hatun. Emir of Rumelia, claimant to the Ottoman throne during the Ottoman Interregnum.
- Mehmed I (c. 1386–1421) – with Devlet Hatun. Governor of Anatolia, he won the civil wars during the Ottoman Interregnum and later became Sultan.
- Yusuf Çelebi (c. 1390 - c. 1417). In 1403, Süleyman Çelebi sent him, together with his half-siblings Kasim Çelebi and Fatma Hatun, as a hostage to Constantinople for order of Manuel II, as a guarantee for the marriage between Süleyman and Theodora, niece of Manuel (illegitimate daughter of Theodore I). Later, he converted to Christianity and changed his name to Demetrios.
- Kasım Çelebi. In 1403, Süleyman Çelebi sent him as a hostage to Constantinople together with his full-sister, Fatma Hatun, and their half-brother, Yusuf, for order of Manuel II, as a guarantee for the marriage between Süleyman and Theodora, niece of Manuel (illegitimate daughter of Theodore I). He had a son, Orhan Çelebi.
- Hasan Çelebi. Still a child at the time of his father's death, he was killed during the subsequent civil wars between his older brothers.
- Ömer Çelebi.
- Korkud Çelebi.
- Ibrahim Çelebi.

=== Daughters ===
Bayezid I had at least five daughters:

- Fatma Hundi Sultan Hatun (1375–1430). She married Seyyid Şemseddin Mehmed Buhari Emir Sultan in 1390 and she had four sons, Emir Ali and other three, and two twins daughters. Legend has it that Hundi and Seyyid were married in secret after having a vision of Muhammad, and that Bayezid only accepted their marriage after his son-in-law was "miraculously" saved from soldiers sent to kill him. According to another version, Seyyd, guest of Bayezid, took advantage of his absence from court to seduce Hundi and marry her.
- Erhundi Hatun. She married Yakup Bey, son of Pars Bey. In 1393, she was offered in marriage to Ladislaus of Naples, who wanted Ottoman help against Sigismund of Hungary, but the marriage never materialized due to the clause requiring the princess's conversion to Christianity.
- Öruz Hatun - with Despina Hatun. In 1403 she married Abu Bakr Mirza, son of Mirza Celaleddin Miranşah, son of Timur. She had at least a child, a daughter, Ayşe.
- Paşa Melek Hatun - with Despina Hatun. In 1403 she married Şemseddin Mehmed, son of Emîr Celaluddîn İslâm, a general of Timur, in Samarkand.
- Fatma Hatun (1393–1417). In 1403 Süleyman Çelebi sent her as a hostage to Constantinople together with her full-brother, Kasim Çelebi, and their half-brother Yusuf, for order of Manuel II, as a guarantee for the marriage between Süleyman and Theodora, niece of Manuel (illegitimate daughter of Theodore I). Later she married an Ottoman sanjak-bey in 1413.

== Personality and assessment ==
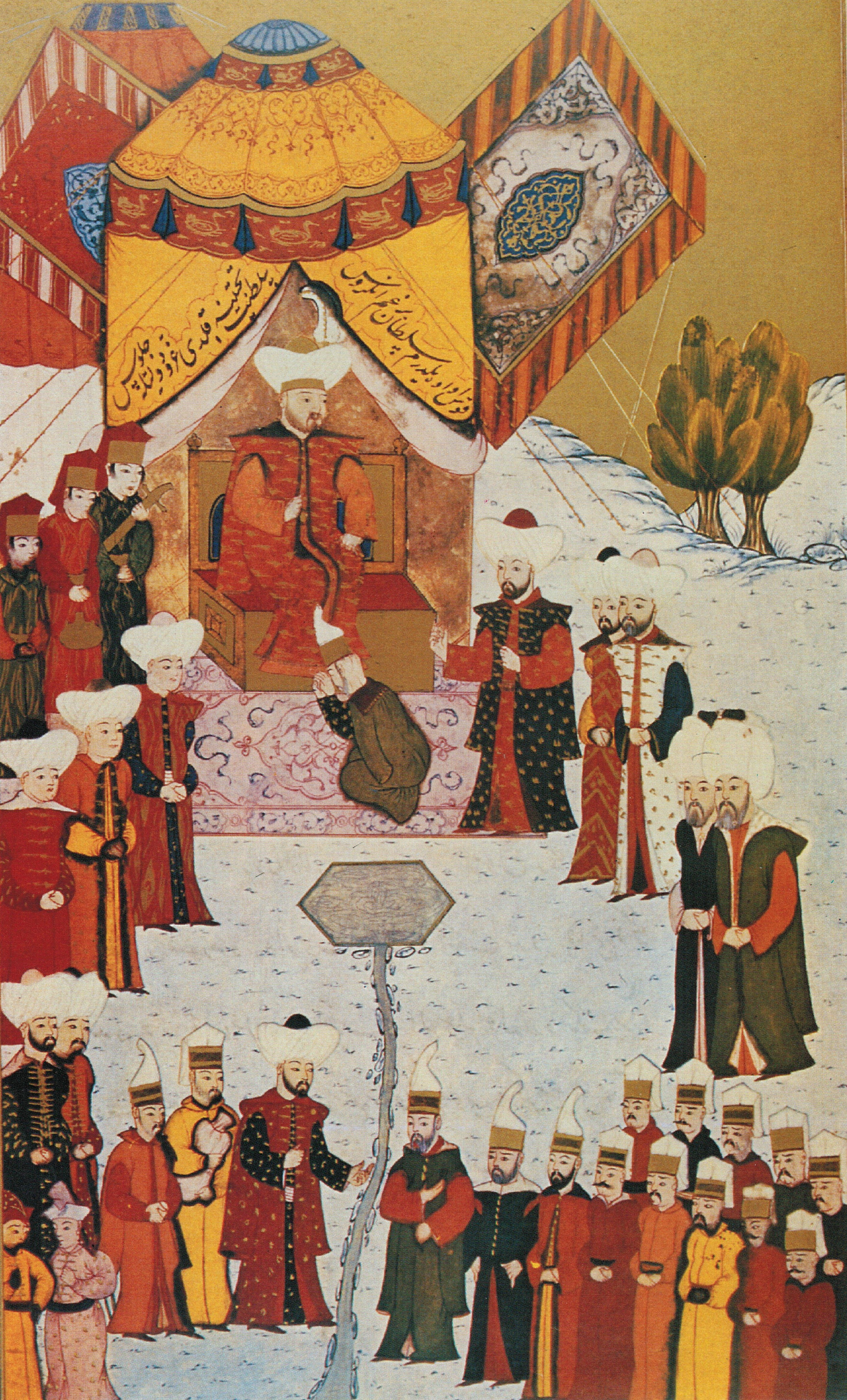
Bayezid is proclaimed sultan. Hünername (1584). Library of the Topkapi Palace Museum (Hazine 1523)

According to the British orientalist, Lord Kinross, Bayezid was distinguished by haste, impulsivity, unpredictability and imprudence. He cared little for state affairs, which he entrusted to his governors. As Kinross writes, between campaigns Bayezid was often engaged in pleasures: gluttony, drunkenness and debauchery. The court of the sultan was famous for its luxury and was comparable to the Byzantine court during its heyday.

At the same time, the sultan was a talented commander. Despite his lust for earthly pleasures, Bayezid was a religious man and used to spend hours in his personal mosque in Bursa. He also kept Islamic theologians in his circle.

In the words of the contemporary Greek historian Doukas:

[Bayezid] was a feared man, precipitate in deeds of war, a persecutor of Christians as no other around him, and in the religion of the Arabs a most ardent disciple of Muhammad, whose unlawful commandments were observed to the utmost, never sleeping, spending his nights contriving intrigues and machinations against the rational flock of Christ.... His purpose was to increase the nation of the Prophet and to decrease that of the Romans. Many cities and provinces did he add to the dominion of the Muslims.

=== Assessment of his reign ===
Bayezid managed to expand the territory of the Ottoman Empire to the Danube and the Euphrates. However, his reign culminated with a humiliating defeat at Ankara, whereby the empire was reduced to the size of a beylik from the time of Orhan. This small territory was divided between Bayezid's two sons by Timur and many beyliks regained their independence. The defeat at Ankara marked the beginning of the Ottoman interregnum, which lasted 10 years.

== In popular culture ==
=== In fiction ===
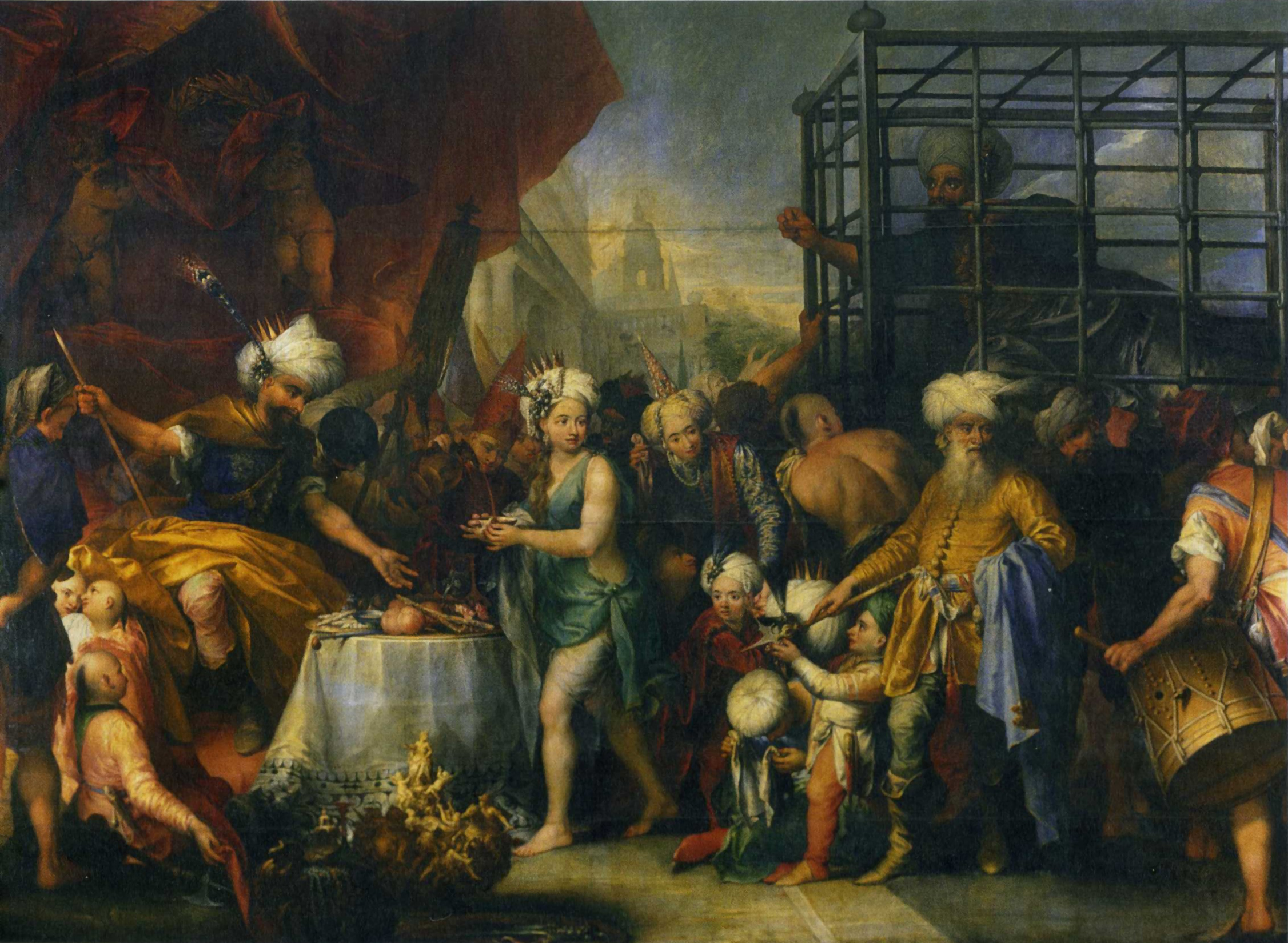
Tamburlaine and Bajazeth (ca. 1700) by Andrea Celesti.

The defeat of Bayezid became a popular subject for later Western European writers, composers, and painters. They embellished the legend that he was taken by Timur to Samarkand with a cast of characters to create an oriental fantasy that has maintained its appeal over the years. Christopher Marlowe's play Tamburlaine the Great was first performed in London in 1587, three years after the formal opening of English-Ottoman trade relations when William Harborne sailed for Constantinople as an agent of the Levant Company.

In 1648, the play Le Gran Tamerlan et Bejezet by Jean Magnon appeared in London, and in 1725, Handel's Tamerlano was first performed and published in London; Vivaldi's version of the story, Bajazet, was written in 1735. Magnon had given Bayezid an intriguing wife and daughter; the Handel and Vivaldi renditions included, as well as Tamerlane and Bayezid and his daughter, a prince of Byzantium and a princess of Trebizond (Trabzon) in a passionate love story. A cycle of paintings in Schloss Eggenberg, near Graz in Austria, translated the theme to a different medium; this was completed in the 1670s shortly before the Ottoman army attacked the Habsburgs in central Europe.

The historical novel The Grand Cham (1921) by Harold Lamb focuses on the quest of its European hero to gain the assistance of Tamerlane in defeating Bayezid. Bayezid (spelled Bayazid) is a central character in the Robert E. Howard story Lord of Samarcand, where he commits suicide at Tamerlane's victory banquet. Bayazid is a main character in the novel The Walls of Byzantium (2013) by James Heneage.

=== TV and media ===
Sultan Bayezid was portrayed in the Serbian 1989 historical drama film Battle of Kosovo, as a participant of the Battle of Kosovo by actor Branislav Lečić, and in the Romanian historical drama Mircea (Proud heritage) by Ion Ritiu as a young Sultan who fought in the battles of Rovine, Nicopolis and Angora.

In the 29th Degree of the Scottish Rite, Northern Masonic Jurisdiction, Bayezid appears as a central figure in a drama that is historical fiction.

== Sources ==
- İnalcık, Halil (1960). "Bāyazīd". In Gibb, H. A. R.; Kramers, J. H.; Lévi-Provençal, E.; Schacht, J.; Lewis, B. & Pellat, Ch. (eds.). The Encyclopaedia of Islam, Second Edition. Volume I: A–B. Leiden: E. J. Brill. pp. 1117–1119. doi:10.1163/1573-3912_islam_SIM_1302. OCLC 495469456.
- Harris, Jonathan (2010) The End of Byzantium. New Haven and London: Yale University Press ISBN 978-0-300-11786-8
- Imber, Colin (2009). The Ottoman Empire, 1300–1650: The Structure of Power (2nd ed.). New York: Palgrave Macmillan. ISBN 978-0-230-57451-9.
- Kastritsis, Dimitris (2007). The Sons of Bayezid: Empire Building and Representation in the Ottoman Civil War of 1402–13. Brill. ISBN 978-90-04-15836-8.
- Nicolle, David (1999) Nicopolis 1396: The Last Crusade. Oxford: Osprey Books ISBN 978-1-85532-918-8

Bayezid I House of Osman Born: 1360 Died: 8 March 1403
Regnal titles
Preceded by Murad I	Ottoman Sultan; 16 June 1389 – 20 July 1402	Succeeded by Mehmed I
