= Battle of Eflatun Pınar =

1472 battle

- Part of Ottoman-Aq Qoyunlu wars Ottoman wars in Asia
- To retaliate against this invasion of Anatolia, Mehmed II, along with his son Prince Mustafa, attacked Persia and defeated them at Battle of Otlukbeli. During the battle, Prince Mustafa killed Zeynel Mirza, son of Uzun Hasan, and sent his severed head to Mehmed II. The image shows Prince Mustafa appearing before Mehmed II at that moment.
Date	19 August 1472
Location	Eflatun Pınar, Konya, Turkey
Result	Ottoman victory

Belligerents
Ottoman Empire	Aq Qoyunlu; Karamanids

Commanders and leaders
Mehmed the Conqueror; Şehzade Mustafa; Gedik Ahmed Pasha; Koca Davud Pasha; Mehmet Beg; Albanian Kasım †	Yusufca Mirza (POW); Zeynel Mirza (POW); Ömer Mirza (POW); Muzaffer Beg (POW); Mehmed Bakır †; Pir Ahmad; Kasım of Karaman

Strength
60,000	50,000

Casualties and losses
2,000 (Known losses under Albanian Kasım's command)	at least 19,000

Battle of Eflatun Pınar or Battle of Kıreli is a battle fought between the Ottoman Empire and Aq Qoyunlu with the Karamanids. Although Mehmed II did not personally take part in this battle at the tactical level, the entire military strategy, operational maneuvers, and the mobilization of the army to Kütahya were carried out on his orders. During this invasion, Mehmed II made highly effective use of the “Strategy of defence in depth” drawing the enemy deep into Anatolian territory, as far as Bursa, the heart of Anatolia. When the Persian army’s supply lines became increasingly extended and they began to retreat, he defeated them at Eflatunpınarı.

== Background ==
As the Ottoman army began withdrawing from Karaman, a foreign force that had arrived from Erzincan and appeared on the Ottoman eastern frontier sent an envoy to Şehzade Bayezid, the governor of the eastern frontier region, declaring: “We are friends of His Majesty the Sultan. We have no hostile intentions toward his lands; our purpose is to proceed to the Dulkadir region.” At the time, Şarabdar Hamza Bey, who was in Tokat, saw no objection to allowing this force to pass through Ottoman territory.

However, after this foreign army passed Sivas, it raided the town of Tokat one morning. After looting and devastating the town, they raped its women and boys. The Persian army inflicted upon Tokat devastation five times greater than that which Timur had inflicted upon Sivas in the past. At that time, Şehzade Bayezid, the governor of Amasya, arrived in Tokat with the troops accompanying him and managed to prevent the destruction and massacre from escalating further.

Meanwhile, the Georgian forces of Uzun Hasan had also laid siege to Trabzon under the command of a nephew of David Komnenos. However, Kapudan Pasha sent 9 galleys and 25 ships, forcing the siege to be lifted.

Uzun Hasan then sent a force of 30,000 men into Anatolia under the command of Bektaşoğlu Ömer Bey, accompanied by Pir Ahmed and Kasım Bey. A force of 20,000 men detached from this army entered the territories of Karaman under the command of Yusufça Mirza. Unable to resist these forces, Gedik Ahmed Pasha withdrew to Konya, where he joined Şehzade Mustafa.

The Persian army laid siege to Kayseri and captured the city. They ruthlessly plundered the surrounding areas. When they reached Ankara, however, they encountered resistance from the fortress. Meanwhile, Uzun Hasan, waiting at his headquarters in Erzincan for a worthy opponent to appear, preserved the honor befitting a ruler.

Sultan Mehmed eventually decided to move into the threatened territories of Anatolia. After seeking the advice of Mahmud Pasha, he gathered not only the army but also all young men capable of fighting. He then arrived at Afyonkarahisar.

As the Persian army set out toward the Konya region, Mehmed II wrote two letters to his son, ordering him to withdraw. Mustafa obeyed his father’s command and withdrew to Kütahya.

There, the Şehzade encountered Davud Pasha, who was the beylerbey of all Anatolia. Acting on the orders of the Turkish Bey, he had made extensive preparations there.

Şehzade Mustafa and Davud Pasha had gathered an army of 60,000 men there. In contrast, the forces of Yusufça Mirza, advancing along the Aksaray–Akşehir route and reinforced by Karaman forces along the way, had reached 50,000 men.

Franz Babinger states that the Persian army consisted of between 50,000 and 100,000 soldiers and, citing Caterino Zeno, firmly confirms that these forces numbered 50,000.

== Battle ==
Meanwhile, the forces of Yusufça Mirza continued their advance toward Bursa. However, their supply lines had become considerably extended, and they had moved far away from their headquarters in Erzincan. In addition, Şehzade Mustafa had begun advancing against them on the orders of Mehmed II.

The Karaman forces began to retreat rapidly. Although Şehzade Mustafa pursued them, he was unable to catch them. He therefore sent a cavalryforce of 4,000 men rapidly forward under the command of Albanian Kasım. Advancing rapidly throughout the night, these forces eventually succeeded in catching up with Yusufça Mirza’s army and immediately launched an attack. In this initial engagement near Beyşehir, the troops under the command of Arnavut Kasım suffered 2,000 casualties, and Kasım himself was martyred. However, thanks to the engagement they had fought, the main Turkish army was able to reach the battlefield and launch an attack against the Persian army. As a result, the two armies came face to face near Eflatunpınarı.

After three hours of fighting, the Persian army began to suffer enormous losses.

This battle, referred to in historical works as the “Battle of Kıreli,” actually took place around Eflatunpınarı, 16 km south of Kıreli. At the end of the battle, the summary of the report Şehzade Mustafa sent to his father was as follows:

“Yusuf, the cousin of Uzun Hasan, along with one or two of his brothers and many renowned eastern beys, as well as the Karamanlı Pir Ahmed and Kasım, passed through Kayseri while I was taking defensive measures with the forces gathered before Konya. At Eflatunpınarı, I appointed my Lala Gedik Ahmed Pasha as the commander of the right wing and Mehmed Pasha, the Beylerbey of Rumelia, as the commander of the left wing, and the battle began on 19 August 1472. The battle continued from morning until afternoon and ended with the defeat of the enemy. The enemy commander-in-chief Yusuf and his brothers Zeynel, Ömer, and Muzaffer were captured, while the heads of their other commanders, Mehmed Bakır and others, were cut off. Most of those who remained were also destroyed.”

Davud Pasha brought the prisoners before Şehzade Mustafa. Şehzade Mustafa sent Yusuf Mirza and his men to Mehmed II with their hands bound. In addition, Pir Ahmed and Kasım Bey, who had been with Yusuf Mirza, managed to escape from the battlefield with their lives.

Of the 20,000 Iranian troops in the army, not even 1,000 survived.
