= Güneri of Karaman =

Beg of Karaman from 1277 to 1300

Guneri Bey
- گونری بیگ

4th Beg of Karamanid
- Reign: 1277–1300
- Predecessor: Mehmed
- Successor: Mahmud
- Born: 1248
- Died: 19 April 1300 (52 years old)
- Father: Karaman Bey
- Mother: Daughter of Kaykhusraw II (?)

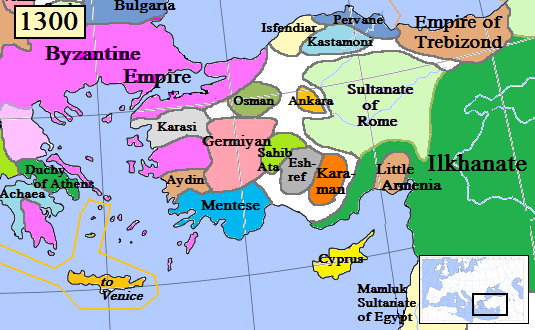
Map Of Anatolia in AD 1300

Güneri of Karaman (or Güneri Bey; d. 19 April 1300) was the third bey of the Karamanid Beylik, a Turkmen principality in 13th-century Anatolia. He was the son of Karaman Bey and a daughter of the Sultan of Rum, Kaykhusraw II. Güneri ascended to the throne following the death of his elder brother, Mehmed I, who fought against the Mongols and was killed in an ambush in 1277. Like his elder brother, he actively participated in the Seljuk civil wars.

== Involvement in the Seljuk Civil War ==
=== Proclamation of Feramurz as Seljuk Sultan ===
Kaykaus II's son, Feramurz, fled to Karamanid lands Güneri Bey supported Feramurz, took him to Karaman, recognized him as the ruler of the Sultanate of Rum, and had the khutbah read in his name. Güneri Bey then marched on Niğde with his army alongside Feramurz.

At the time, Seljuk forces assembled by order of Kaykhusraw III were stationed in Niğde under the command of İzzeddin (son of Mu'in al-Din Parwana), the grandson of Sahib Ata, and Saadeddin Çelebi. The two armies collided at Niğde; the Karamanids and Feramurz were defeated and their forces dispersed. Feramurz subsequently fled first to the Armenian Kingdom of Cilicia and later to the Byzantine Empire.

=== Enthronement of Kaykhusraw III's Sons ===
Following the execution of Kaykhusraw III in Erzurum and the ascension of Mesud II to the Seljuk throne under Ilkhanate backing, political instability deepened. Ahmad Tekuder subsequently partitioned the Seljuk realm between Mesud II and the two young sons of Kaykhusraw III, whose claims were pressed by their grandmother. Güneri Bey, alongside Ashrafid forces, supported the two young princes and proclaimed them sultans, further joining the succession struggles within the Sultanate.

Kaykhusraw III's mother sent Şüca Eynesi to secure the support of Güneri Bey and Eshrefid Süleyman Bey. In return for their allegiance, Güneri Bey was appointed beglerbeg (commander-in-chief) and Süleyman Bey became the regent. On 14 May 1285, the Turkmen forces advanced on Konya and enthroned Kaykhusraw's two young sons. However, after the two princes were killed shortly thereafter, Güneri Bey's tenure as Seljuk beglerbeg came to an end.

== Conflict with the Armenian Kingdom of Cilicia ==
In 1286, Güneri Bey shifted his campaign toward the Armenian Kingdom of Cilicia, advancing on and besieging Tarsus. Despite the efforts of the Armenian King Leo II, the city was captured and sacked by the Turkmen forces. In response, Leo II requested assistance from the Mongols, who dispatched the Seljuk grand vizier Sahib Ata to the region. Although Güneri Bey evaded capture, Karaman was taken and looted by Mongol and Seljuk troops. Shortly after their withdrawal, Güneri Bey reestablished control over Karaman.

== Conflict with the Eshrefids ==
Despite their previous alliance, political disagreements led to a breach between Güneri Bey and the Eshrefid ruler, Süleyman Bey. In 1290, Karamanid forces launched an attack on Eshrefid territory, capturing Beyşehir and taking Süleyman Bey prisoner. Although Süleyman Bey's son later managed to repel Güneri Bey's troops in a counter-offensive, he was unable to secure his father's immediate release. Süleyman Bey remained in captivity for a period before eventually being freed.

== Conflict with Gaykhatu ==
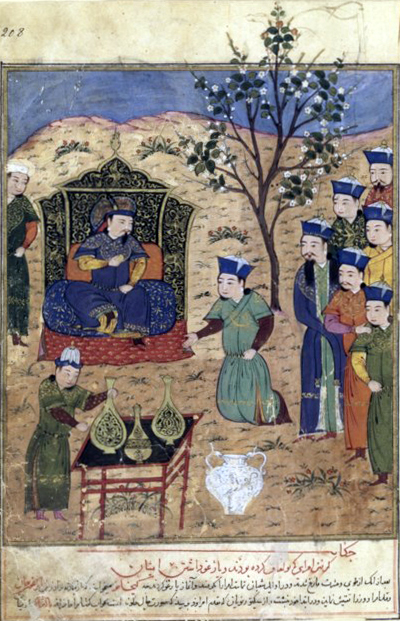
Gaykhatu interrogating Shingtûr Nuyân, from the Jami' al-tawarikh by Rashid al-Din Hamadani.

Following a three-year period of peace, hostilities resumed between the Karamanids and the Seljuks. A Seljuk army raided the surroundings of Larende (modern Karaman), during which Seyfeddin Türkeri, an ally of the Karamanids, was killed. In response, Güneri Bey laid siege to Konya. Unable to lift the siege, the Seljuk Sultan requested military assistance from the Ilkhanid ruler Gaykhatu. In November 1291, Gaykhatu marched into Anatolia with a large Mongol force. He divided his army into two columns, sending one toward Akşehir while personally leading the other against Güneri Bey. Mongol forces captured Ereğli and Larende, subjecting both cities to widespread destruction and massacres.

The Mongol commander Tek Timur pursued Güneri Bey and his troops into the rugged mountains. Gaykhatu then directed his army into Eshrefid territory, where extensive looting and casualties were inflicted. Mongol raids subsequently extended to Denizli and the domain of the Menteşe. Despite eighteen days of severe destruction across the region, Karamanid resistance persisted. After completing the campaign, Gaykhatu withdrew through Konya to Kayseri.

Taking advantage of Gaykhatu's departure in 1292, Güneri Bey reorganized his forces and launched two separate raids against Konya, plundering livestock and properties from surrounding tribes. However, two of Güneri Bey's relatives were killed during these clashes.

== Recapture of Alaiye (1292) ==
In the same year, King Henry II of Cyprus launched a naval expedition and captured Alaiye Castle. However, Güneri Bey's brother, Mahmud Bey, successfully recaptured the city from the Crusaders. Following the victory, Mahmud Bey established the Alaiye under Karamanid suzerainty and became its ruler.

== Death ==
Güneri Bey died on 19 April 1300. Following his death, he was succeeded as leader of the principality by his brother, Mahmud Bey.

Regnal titles
Preceded by Mehmet I	Bey of Karaman; 1277–1300	Succeeded by Mahmut
