= Bayburdlu =

Turkmen tribe in Turkey and Iran

Bayburdlu (Persian: بایبوردلو), or Bayburtlu (بایبورتلو), is a Turkoman tribe inhabiting the region of Arasbaran in northwestern Iran. The tribe presumably had its roots in the area around the city of Bayburt. According to Karamanname, the Bayburdlu tribe attained land between Konya and Ankara in central Anatolia upon its conquest by the Karamanids, and the tribe's name was reflected in that of a local Ottoman-era district. The loyalty of the Bayburdlu tribe changed to Iran with the rise of the Safavids, under whom many tribesmen served as governors and military commanders.

== Etymology ==
The tribe's name implies that the tribe's origins lay in and around the town of Bayburt in northeastern Anatolia. According to historian Hoseyn Baybordi, bay means big, while burd denotes "head", and the tribe may be unrelated to the city of Bayburt. Later in history, the tribe's name was often written as "Bayburdi" to ease the Persian pronunciation.

== History ==
According to the narrative in the Menakibname of Dediği Sultan, Bayburd Beg and Turghud Beg, the eponymous leaders of the Bayburdlu and Turghudlu tribes, were brothers who were dispatched to Anatolia (Rum) from Khorasan by Didighi Sultan, an influential descendant of the Sufi poet Ahmad Yasawi. The anonymous author of Karamanname Shikari narrates that when the pastures between Konya and Ankara entered Karamanid rule, one half of the region was granted to Bayburd Beg, while the other half was granted to Turghud Beg. During the reigns of the Ottoman Sultans Bayezid II (r. 1481–1512) and Selim I r. 1512–20), the nahiyah of Bayburd, the tribe's namesake, was part of the kaza of Turghud and comprised the lands south of Ereğli and east of Karaman. This district was turned into a kaza during the reign of Suleiman the Magnificent (r. 1520–66).

The Bayburdlu tribe was loyal to Safavid Iran, and several tribe members were prominent figures within the state. Qaraja Ilyas was one of Ismail I's (r. 1501–24) commanders at the Battle of Sharur in 1501. Qara Khan, the son of Qaraja Ilyas, was the Safavid governor of Erivan and Shuragil at the time of Tahmasp I's death (r. 1524–76) and was notable for his victory over the Ottoman forces of Erzurum in 1577/8. During the reigns of Mohammad Khodabanda (r. 1578–1587) and Abbas the Great (r. 1587–1629), Shahverdi Beg Bayburdlu was the yasāvol-e ṣoḥbat, and is known to have left much wealth for his descendants when he died in 1614. At the time of Abbas's death, Morad Khan Sultan Bayburdlu was serving as the governor of Arasbaran in northwestern Iran. Members of the Bayburdlu tribe were often appointed as the governors of the region of Arasbaran, where they had settled. A firman (decree) of the Safavid Shah Hoseyn (r. 1694–1722) attests to the recruitment of Emam Qoli Beg, the son of Mohammed Beg Bayburdlu, in the district around Shaki and Shirvan. Sixteenth-century poet Sadiqi Beg mentions one Mohammad Beg from the Bayburdlu tribe who wrote poems in Turkic.

== Bibliography ==
- Baybordi, Hoseyn (1962). تاریخ ارسباران [History of Arasbaran] (in Persian). Ibn Sina Publications.
- Oberling, Pierre (1988). "Bāybūrtlū". In Yarshater, Ehsan (ed.). Encyclopædia Iranica (Online ed.). Encyclopædia Iranica Foundation.
- Sümer, Faruk (1976). Safevi Devleti'nin Kuruluşu ve Gelişmesinde Anadolu Türklerinin Rolü [The Formation of the Safavid State and the Role of Anatolian Turks in Its Development] (in Turkish). Ankara: Güven Matbaası. ISBN 9789751604460. OCLC 984374787.
- Sümer, Faruk (2012). "Turgutlular". TDV Encyclopedia of Islam, Vol. 41 (Tevekkül – Tüsterî) (in Turkish). Istanbul: Turkiye Diyanet Foundation, Centre for Islamic Studies. pp. 420–421. ISBN 978-975-389-713-6.
- Tapper, Richard (1997). Frontier Nomads of Iran: A Political and Social History of the Shahsevan. Cambridge University Press. ISBN 978-0-52158-336-7.
