= Yahshi Khan of Karaman =

Fifth ruler of the beylik of Karaman

Yahshi Khan
- السيد ياشي

5th Beg of Ḳaraman
- Reign: 1308 - 1312
- Predecessor: Badr al-Din Mahmud
- Successor: Musa
Names
- Yahshi khan bin Mahmud
- House: Karaman dynasty
- Father: Badr al-Din Mahmud

Yahshi Khan (1308 - 1312) was the fifth ruler of the beylik of Karaman. He reigned for four years, from 1308 to 1312. He conquered Konya, the capital of the fallen Anatolian Seljuk State. He was succeeded by his brother, Musa of Karaman.
