= Nefise Hatun =

Ottoman princess, daughter of Murad I

Nefise Melek Hatun
- Princess of Ottoman Empire; Consort of Karamanids ruler
- Born: Before 1360; Bursa, Ottoman Empire
- Died: post 1403; Karaman Beylik
- Burial: Karaman, Karaman Beylik
- Spouse: Alaeddin Ali of Karaman (m. 1378; died 1397)
- Issue: Mehmed II of Karaman; Alaeddin Ali II of Karaman; Oğuz Bey
Names
- Nefise Melek Hatun (birth); Sultan Hatun (marriage)
- House: Ottoman (birth); Karamanids (marriage)
- Father: Murad I
- Religion: Sunni Islam

Nefise Melek Sultan Hatun (Ottoman Turkish: نفیسہ خاتون; c. 1363 – post 1403) was an Ottoman princess, and daughter of Sultan Murad I. She was the wife of Alaeddin Ali Bey of Karaman and mother of Mehmed II of Karaman and Alaeddin Ali II of Karaman. She is known as the first politically active Ottoman princess.

== Origin ==
Nefise Melek Hatun was born in Bursa before 1360. Her father was the Ottoman Sultan Murad I, while the identity of her mother is not known.

== Marriage ==
In 1378, Nefise's brother Bayezid married Devletşah Sultan Hatun, princess of Germiniyan. During the wedding reception, Nefise's father Murad I negotiated with the representatives of Karaman, Ali Bey and Davud Bey, to give her in marriage to Alaeddin Ali (ruler of Karaman, grandson of Ali and brother of Davud). Karaman was one of the most powerful beyliks and, at the time, the main opponent of the Ottomans. The marriage was supposed to be the basis of an alliance between the two states, that were at that time adversaries.

Nefise's dowry included 100,000 gold coins, one hundred horses, ten herds of camels, nine carpets, nine chests of jewels, gold, and precious stones, and more than fifty rolls of silk, velvet, and gold fabrics from France, Syria, Egypt, and Turkey. Her dowry in case of divorce consisted of the territories of Aksehir and Aksaray, including the neighboring villages and all income of these territories. At that point, the marriage was announced in both the states during Friday prayers.

The wedding ceremony was held in Bursa, with Candarli Kara Halil as the bride's representative and Mevlana Muslihiddin as the groom's. Soon after, Nefise set out for Karaman. During the journey, the procession was attacked by Mongol raiders, who were, however, put to flight by the cavalry units escorting the princess. In Karaman, the wedding ceremony was repeated, this time in the presence of both bride and groom. Among the guests were the rulers of Saruhan, Aydin, Menteşe and Eshrefoglu. In Karaman, Nefise became known as Sultan Hatun (Lady Sultana) in reference to her birth status. The couple had at least four children, four sons.

== Political activity ==
Contrary to expectations, the marriage between Nefise and Alaeddin did not produce any lasting peace, but thanks to Nefise's intercession Alaeddin managed to obtain forgiveness several times first from Murad I and then from Bayezid I.

In 1386, while Murad was busy elsewhere, Alaeddin occupied the territories along the Ottoman-Karaman border, which were considered Ottoman protectorates. Murad reacted to this faster than expected and forced Alaeddin to retreat to a besieged Konya. For twelve days, Alaeddin sent Murad peace proposals, which were rejected. At that point, Nefise secretly left Konya with her three sons and went to her father, pleading on behalf of her husband. Nefise's embassy was successful and Alaeddin was pardoned in exchange for a formal act of submission and the cession of the territories of Beysehir.

Alaeddin rebelled a second time between 1390 and 1391, immediately after the death of Murad and the accession of his son Bayezid I. Once again, he was defeated within a few weeks and again only managed to save his life through the mediation of Nefise.

== Widowhood ==
Alaeddin's third and final rebellion was in late 1396, when he occupied Ankara and took the governor, Sari Temirtash Pasha, prisoner. This time, Nefise remained in Karaman with her sons. Bayezid was fighting in Nicopolis, but he reached Ankara in a very short time, with an army of 150,000 men, more than double that of Alaedddin. Alaeddin released the governor and sent him to Bayezid with an offer of peace, which was rejected. Alaeddin died in 1397, but versions differ: according to one, Bayezid declared that he would spare anyone who would deliver Alaeddin's head, who was then betrayed by his own army. According to others, Alaeddin was delivered alive and Bayezid himself executed him. Finally, other sources say he died in battle, during the last attempt to break the siege.

Bayezid sent Alaeddin's head to Karaman with orders to wait and open the gates to the Ottoman army. While the people, the government and Alaeddin's sons wanted to resist, Nefise, who was entrusted with the regency, decided to surrender. She then went to Bayezid with her sons and surrendered unconditionally, on the condition that he spare the city. Bayezid accepted, but imposed that Nefise and her sons return to live in Bursa, where mother and sons lived in luxury but strictly separated.

Mustafa Çelebi, son of Bayezid, became governor of Karaman in place of Mehmed, eldest son of Alaeddin and Nefise.

== Death ==
Nefise remained in Bursa until, in 1403, she was reached by the news of the death of Bayezid I (who died in Akşehir as a prisoner of Timur). At that point, she and her sons immediately returned to Karaman, where she lived at the court of her son Mehmed, who became the new Karamanids ruler (Mustafa Çelebi fought with his father and disappeared after the battle). She died on an unknown date and was buried in the mausoleum that she built in the city, now lost, although it is believed to have been located in the Khatuniye madrasa, built by Nefise herself.

== Issue ==
By her marriage, she had at least three children, three sons:

- Nasiraeddin Mehmed II of Karaman (1379 – 1423), ruler of Karamanids after his father;
- Bengi Alaeddin Ali II of Karaman (1381 – 1424), ruler of Karamanids after his brother;
- Oğuz Bey.

== Patronage ==
In 1388, in Karaman, Nefise established the Theological College. She also founded the Khatuniye madrasa (today a museum) and a hammam, the revenues from which were used to finance the construction of her mausoleum.

== Legacy ==
Nefise Hatun was the first Ottoman princess known to have actively participated in politics. She was defined as "a predatory bird" and "in everything equal to a man". Much has been written about her unswerving loyalty to her husband and sons rather than to her father (Murad I) and brother (Bayezid I), but judgments on this are matter of speech, ranging from praise to blame.

== Annotations ==
1. She is also called Nefise Sultan Hatun, Melek Sultan Hatun, Melek Hatun, Sultan Hatun.

== Sources ==
- Uluçay, Mustafa Çağatay (2011). Padişahların kadınları ve kızları. Ankara, Ötüken.
- Sakaoğlu, Necdet (2008). Bu mülkün kadın sultanları: Vâlide sultanlar, hâtunlar, hasekiler, kadınefendiler, sultanefendiler. Oğlak Yayıncılık. ISBN 978-9-753-29623-6.
