= Süleyman of Karaman =

Beg of Karaman from 1356 to 1361

Süleyman of Karaman (Seyfeddin Süleyman) was a bey of the Karaman Beylik, a Turkish principality in Anatolia in the 14th century.

His father was Halil Bey. He served as the governor of Ermenek during his uncle Musa Bey's reign. Upon the death of Musa in 1356, he became the bey of Karaman. He appointed his brother Alaattin Ali Bey as the governor of Ermenek. His brother also served as a commander during the wars. According to the contemporary Turkish writer Şikari, after Ali defeated a coalition of forces, the losers collaborated with Mehmet, the ruler of the neighbouring beylik of Eretna, against Süleyman. In 1361 while he was on his way to a burial service of one of his old soldiers, he was assassinated.

His tomb is in Konya, next to the tomb of the mother of Mevlana (Rumi).

Regnal titles
Preceded by Musa Bey	Bey of Karaman; 1356–1361	Succeeded by Alaatin Ali Bey
