= Tomb of Seyyid Mahmut Hayrani =

Tomb in Turkey

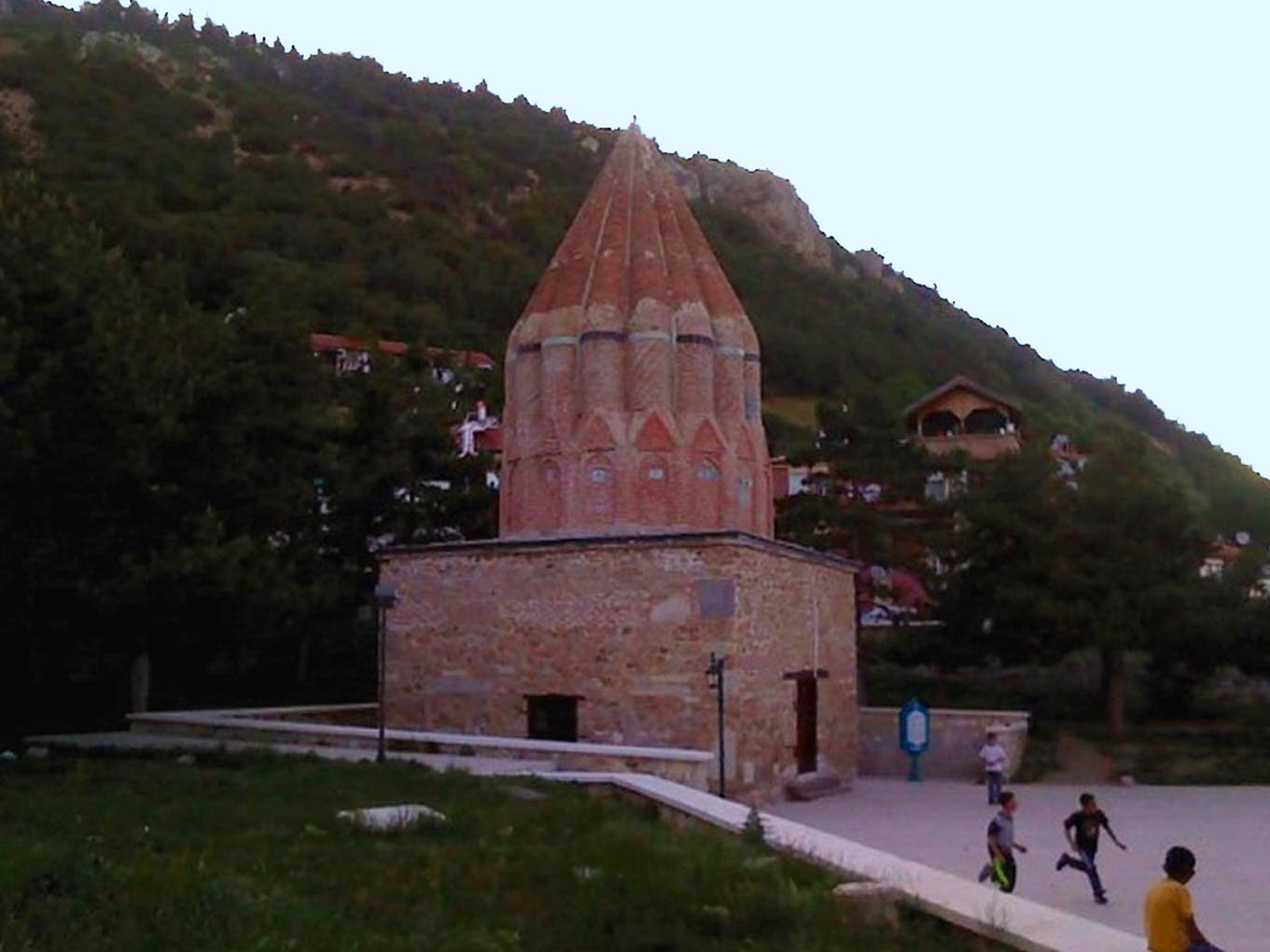
Tomb of Seyyid Mahmut

The tomb of Seyyid Mahmut Hayrani (Turkish: Seyyid Mahmut Hayrani Türbesi) is in Akşehir, Konya Province, Turkey.

== Seyyid Mahmut Hayrani ==
Seyyid Mahmut was a Sufi mystic and a follower of Mevlana (Rumi). He was born in Harran, what is now a village of Şanlıurfa Province, Turkey. He travelled to Konya and met with Mevlana. Then he travelled to Akşehir about 100 kilometres (62 mi) northwest of Konya where he died in 1268. Famous satirical figure Nasreddin Hoca was probably a follower of Seyyid Mahmut.

== The tomb ==
Seyyid Mahmut's tomb is in the old quarter of Akşehir, (at 38°21′19.50″N 31°24′26.36″E, at the foot of the Sultan Mountains to the south of the city.) There is also a mescit (small mosque) known as Ferruhşah Mosque, next to the tomb. The mescit was the temporary prison reserved for Ottoman sultan Beyazit I after his defeat in the Battle of Ankara in 1402. While the Ottoman Empire was engaged in interregnum following the defeat, Akşehir was incorporated into Karamanid realm and Mehmet II of Karaman rebuilt the tomb in 1409.

== Technical details ==
The lower stage of the tomb is square, the upper stage is cylindrical and the roof conical. The interior of the tomb is decorated by turquoise stars and hexagonal patterns.

There were four wooden coffins (Turkish: sanduka) of high artistic value in the tomb. These coffins were stolen in 1976. One of the coffins is now in the David Samling Museum in Copenhagen, Denmark. Two others were confiscated before they were sent out of Turkey. They are now in Turkish and Islamic Arts Museum in Istanbul.
