= Balkusan =

- Village
- Location within Turkey Location within Turkey Central Anatolia
- Coordinates: 36°46′N 32°53′E
- Country: Turkey
- Province: Karaman
- District: Ermenek
- Elevation: 1,600 m (5,200 ft)
- Population (2022): 171
- Time zone: UTC+3 (TRT)
- Postal code: 70400
- Area code: 0338

Balkusan (formerly called Balgusan, Balkasun) is a village in Ermenek District, Karaman Province, Central Anatolia, Turkey. Its population is 171 (2022). It is situated in a high plateau of the Taurus Mountains. Distance to Ermenek is 22 kilometres (14 mi).

The origin of the village residents are Turkmens of Afshar tribe who had migrated from the Central Asia in the Medieval Age. The name of the village may refer to Balasagun, a historical city in Kyrgyzstan. The village was a more important place in the Medieval Age. The tombs of Karaman Bey and Mahmut Bey, beys of Karamanoğlu beylik are in the village. Main economic activity of the village is agriculture. Beehiving is another important activity.
