= Candar =

Candar or Çandar may refer to:

- Candar dynasty, a princely Anatolian dynasty
- Candar corps, palace guards in some medieval Turkish states
- Cendere, Nallıhan, historically known as Çandar, a village in Nallıhan district, Ankara Province, Turkey
  - Çandarlı family, a prominent Turkish political family in the Ottoman Empire, from the village
    - Çandarlı, a town and district of İzmir Province, Turkey, named after the family
