= Şemseddin of Karaman =

Beg of Karaman from 1350 to 1352

Semsettin Beg
- بك

Beg of Karamanid
- Reign: 1350–1352
- Predecessor: Ahmet Bey
- Successor: Musa Bey
- Born: 1308
- Died: 1352 (aged 46)
- Father: Ibrahim Bey

Şemsettin of Karaman (died 1352) was a bey of the Karaman Beylik, a Turkish beylik in Anatolia in the 14th century.

His father was İbrahim Bey. He succeeded his brother Ahmet Bey in 1350. However, his reign was short, and it is believed he was poisoned by one of his brothers in 1352.

Regnal titles
Preceded by Ahmet Bey	Bey of Karaman; 1350–1352	Succeeded by Musa Bey
