= Ferruhşah Mosque =

Mosque in Akşehir, Konya, Turkey

- Ferruhşah Mescidi
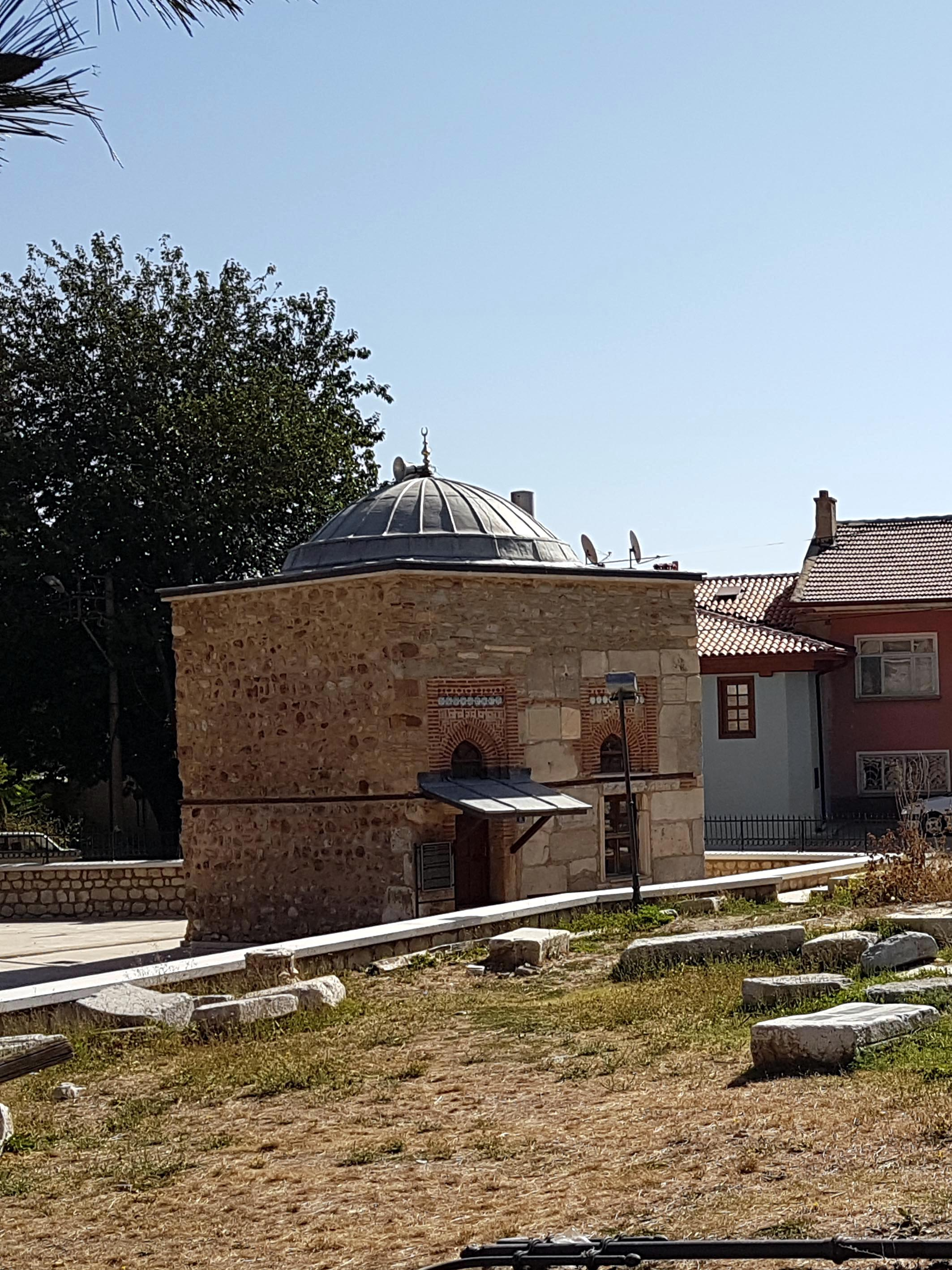

- Location within Turkey

Religion
- Affiliation: Islam

Location
- Municipality: Akşehir
- State: Konya
- Country: Turkey
- Interactive map of Ferruhşah Mosque
- Coordinates: 38°21′19″N 31°24′28″E

Architecture
- Type: mosque
- Established: 1224

Specifications
- Length: 6.6 m
- Width: 6.36 m
- Materials: rubble stone

Ferruhşah Mosque (Turkish: Ferruhşah Mescidi) is a small historical mosque in Akşehir, Turkey. In Turkish mescit refers to small mosques.

The mosque is in Akşehir, Konya Province. It is in the same yard as the tomb of Seydi Mahmut Hayrani. According to the inscription of the building it was built by a certain Ferruh Şah in 1224 during the reign of Kayqubad I of Sultanate of Rum. Following its last restoration in 2006, it was opened to religious services.

The outer dimensions of the building are 6.6 metres (22 ft) by 6.36 metres (20.9 ft). It has three windows. The building material in the north and west sides is rubble stone. In west and south sides bricks were used together with some collect material.

== Historical importance ==
This mosque was the mosque in which Ottoman sultan Bayezit I was imprisoned by Timur following the battle of Ankara in 1402. After his death in this building, his body was carried to Bursa by his son Musa Çelebi.
