= Dediği Sultan =

Dervish

Dediği Sultan, also known as Didiği Sultan or Dediği Dede, was a dervish colonist in medieval Anatolia. Not much is known about his life. Most details about him come from his Menakibname, which locates his origin in Turkestan and claims descent from Ahmad Yasawi. He lived in the village of Mahmuthisar (located in modern-day Konya Province of Turkey) among the Turghudlu and Bayburdlu tribes. His tomb is located in Mahmuthisar. According to a folk tale, Dediği Sultan had four or seven siblings. Two younger siblings lived with Dediği Sultan. His other five reputed siblings' names were Handevi, Kandevi, Jomard Dede, Satilmish Dede, and Bahlul Beg.

== Bibliography ==
- Öztürk, Rıdvan (2015). "Dediği Sultan Adı ve Bir Yerleştirme Örneği: Dedegi~Dediği". Türk Kültürü ve Hacı Bektaş Veli Araştırmaları Dergisi (in Turkish) (74): 119–130. ISSN 2147-9895.
