= Alaattin Ali of Karaman =

Beg of Karaman from 1361 to 1397

Alaattin Ali I of Karaman
- Sultan of Karaman
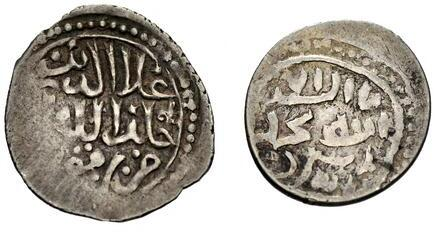
- Coin struck by Ala al-Din in Laranda.

Sultan of Karamanid
- Reign: 1361–1398
- Predecessor: Sayf al-Din Suleyman
- Successor: Nasr al-Din Mehmed II
- Born: 1342; Karamanid State, Anatolia
- Died: 1398 (aged 56); Konya, Karamanid State
- Spouse: Nefise Melek Sultan Hatun (m. 1378)
- Issue: Nasr al-Din Mehmed II; Bengi Ali; Oğuz Bey
- Dynasty: Karaman dynasty
- Father: Halil of Karaman
- Religion: Islam

Alaattin Ali I of Karaman (d.1398), also Alaeddin Ali I, was a sultan of Karamanids, a Turkish principality in Anatolia in the 14th century. Like most other Karaman sultans, Alaattin Ali was a rival of the rising Ottoman Empire, and the two principalities engaged in chronic wars against one another.

== Early life ==
His father was Halil. After his brother Süleyman ascended to the throne, he was appointed as the governor of Ermenek. However, after his brother was assassinated in Karaman, he succeeded his brother in 1361. He had family ties to the Ottoman dynasty, for he married Nefise Hatun, Murat I's daughter.

== War with the neighbours ==
In the 14th century, Anatolia was in turmoil. In addition to Karaman beylik there were many other Anatolian beyliks. Ali invaded the territories of neighbouring beyliks; Hamidoğlu, Eretna and Germiyan. He even tried to raid Kadi Burhanettin's dominions, but without success.

== First war against the Ottoman Empire ==
Ottoman Sultan Murat was engaged in Rumeli (European section of the empire), and Ali saw his chance to capture Beysehir, an Ottoman fort, in 1386. Murat returned to Anatolia and defeated Ali's forces in a location named Frenkyazısı, near Konya, the capital. According to Professor Halil İnalcık, the importance of this battle was that it showed the superiority of the regular army (janissaries) over tribal forces. After Nefise's mediation however, Murat agreed to withdraw on the condition that Beyşehir be handed to Ottomans.

== Second war against the Ottoman Empire ==
After Murat I was killed in the battle of Kosovo in 1389, Ali invaded Ottoman territory for the second time. But in 1390, Beyazıt I, the new sultan, returned to Anatolia, and after defeating minor beyliks, he began preparing for the final assault on Karaman beylik. Two other monarchs in Anatolia, Kadı Burhanettin and Süleyman of Candar however, afraid of the rising Ottoman power, formed an alliance against Ottomans. Ottomans once again agreed to lift the siege with similar conditions as of 1386.

== Relations with Timur ==
In 1394, the Turco Mongol commander Timur from the present day Uzbekistan, sought alliances in Anatolia, and Ali readily accepted the offer. By this alliance, he planned to gain a valuable shelter against the Ottoman Empire and Kadı Burhanettin two powers he most feared. But Timur didn't appear in Anatolia till 1402 and his shelter wasn't effective as Ali expected. Although he tried to raid Burhanettin's territory, Burhanettin struck back.

== Third war against the Ottoman Empire and death ==
While Beyazıt was engaged in Wallachia (southern Romania) Ali invaded Ottoman territory once more. This time the target was Ankara. He arrested Timurtaş Pasha, the beylerbey of Anatolia. In 1397, Beyazıt once again returned to Anatolia, disregarding Ali's peace calls; he captured Konya and had Ali executed.

== After death ==
All Karaman territory was annexed by the Ottomans and two of his sons Mehmet II and Bengi Ali were jailed. However, a few years later, following the defeat of Beyazıt by Timur in the battle of Ankara, the beylik was restored.

== Issue ==
In 1378, he married Nefise Melek Sultan Hatun, the daughter of Ottoman Sultan Murad I.

They had at least three sons:

- Mehmed II of Karaman (1379-1423), who was his father's successor after his death;
- Alaeddin Ali Bey (1381-1424);
- Oğuz Bey, probably died in infancy.

Regnal titles
Preceded by Süleyman Bey	Bey of Karaman; 1361–1398	Succeeded by Mehmet II
