= Qaraja Ilyas =

Safavid governor of Erivan from 1502

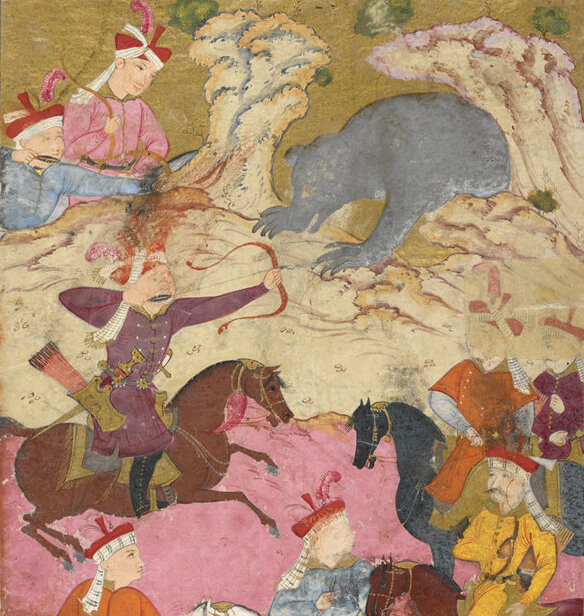
- Ismail I (r. 1501–24) hunting bear with Qaraja Ilyas, in a c. 1650 miniature by Mo'en Mosavver.

Beglarbeg of Erivan
- In office 1502–?
- Succeeded by: Amir Beg Mawsillu

Personal details
- Tribe: Bayburdlu

Qaraja Ilyas Bayburdlu was Beglarbeg (governor) of the Erivan Province of Safavid Iran from 1502. Qaraja Ilyas was a member of the Turkoman Bayburdlu tribe. He was one of Ismail I's (r. 1501–24) commanders at the Battle of Sharur in 1501.

== Bibliography ==
- Floor, Willem M. (2008). Titles and Emoluments in Safavid Iran: A Third Manual of Safavid Administration, by Mirza Naqi Nasiri. Washington, DC: Mage Publishers. ISBN 978-1933823232.
- Tapper, Richard (1997). Frontier nomads of Iran: a political and social history of the Shahsevan. Cambridge University Press.
- Oberling, Pierre (1988). "Bāybūrtlū". In Yarshater, Ehsan (ed.). Encyclopædia Iranica (Online ed.). Encyclopædia Iranica Foundation.
