= Ahmet of Karaman =

Beg of Karaman in 1350

Ahmet of Karaman, was a short term bey of Karaman Beylik, a Turkish principality in Anatolia in the 14th century. He succeeded his father İbrahim Bey. But his succession date is not known. According to one source, he fell during a battle against Mongols in 1350.

Regnal titles
Preceded by İbrahim I	Bey of Karaman ? – 1350	Succeeded by Şemseddin Bey
