= Halil of Karaman =

Beg of Karaman from 1332 to 1340

Alaeddin Halil Beg
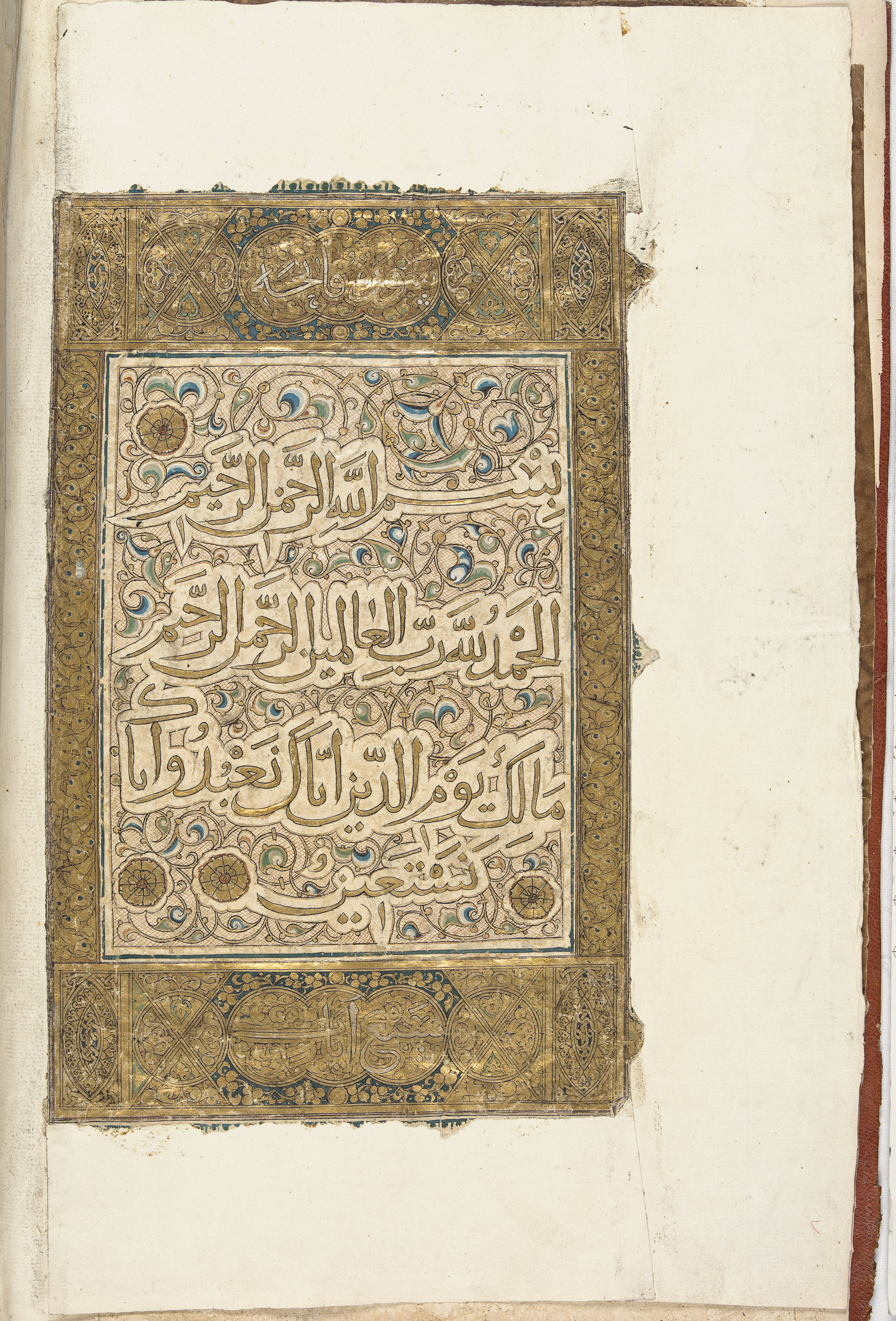
- Page from the Quran manuscript made for Halil of Karaman. Konya, 1314. Mevlâna Museum

Beg of Karaman
- Reign: 1332–1340
- Predecessor: Ibrahim
- Successor: Ibrahim
- Born: 1288
- Died: 1340 (aged 52)
- Dynasty: Karamanid Dynasty
- Father: Mahmut Bey

Halil, also known as Alaeddin Halil, was a bey of Karaman Beylik, a Turkoman principality in Anatolia in the 14th century.

His father was Mahmut Bey. He succeeded his elder brothers Musa and İbrahim in 1332. He wasn't active in military campaigns. But he commissioned some mosques and other social buildings in Ermenek during his reign. He died in 1340.

Regnal titles
Preceded by İbrahim I	Bey of Karaman; 1332–1340	Succeeded by İbrahim I
