= Ibrahim II of Karaman =

Beg of Karaman from 1424 to 1464

Ibrahim II
- Sultan; Khan; Beg

Sultan of Karaman
- Reign: 1424–1464
- Predecessor: Ala al-Din Ali II
- Successor: Ishaq
- Born: 1400
- Died: 1464 (aged 63–64)
- Consort: Ilaldi Sultan Hatun
- Issue more...: İshak; Piri Ahmed; Kasim
- House: Karamanids
- Father: Mehmet II
- Mother: İnci Hatun
- Religion: Islam
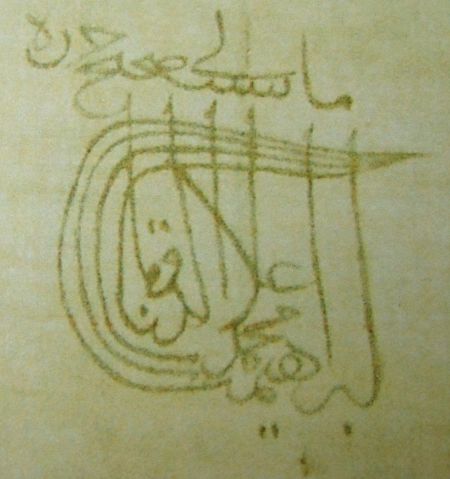
- Tughra

Ibrahim II (1400–1464) was a sultan of Karaman from 1424 to 1464.

== Background ==
During the post-Seljuk era in the second half of the 13th century, numerous Turkoman principalities, which are collectively known as the Anatolian beyliks, emerged in Anatolia. Initially the Karamanids, centered on the modern provinces of Karaman and Konya, were the most important power in Anatolia. But towards the end of the 14th century the Ottomans began to dominate most of Anatolia, reducing Karamanid influence and prestige. Thus the campaign of Timur to Anatolia and the ensuing Ottoman Interregnum gave the Karamanids a chance for revival. However the Karamanids also experienced a period of interregnum during Ottoman interregnum, so they were unable to end Ottoman domination in Anatolia.

== Ibrahim Bey and the Ottomans ==
Ibrahim Bey was Mehmet Bey's son. He fought against his uncle Ali Bey, and with Ottoman support he ascended to throne in 1424. Nevertheless, their help did not ensure his fidelity to the Ottomans. He secretly allied himself with Kingdom of Hungary against them. During the Ottoman wars in Europe, he was able to capture the city of Beyşehir from the Ottomans. However, in 1433, Ottoman Sultan Murat II returned to Anatolia and Ibrahim sued for peace in 1435. Nevertheless, shortly after the peace, Ibrahim laid a siege on Amasya an important Ottoman city to which Murat reacted by supporting the Dulkadirids to capture the city of Kayseri and İsa, Ibrahim's brother, to capture Akşehir from Karamanids. Ibrahim was forced to lift the siege in 1437. During the following seven years peace prevailed in Anatolia. But in 1444 when a great crusader army began marching on the Ottoman capital, Ibrahim saw his chance and plundered Ottoman cities in Anatolia including Ankara and Kütahya. Murat, caught between two fires, had to sign the Treaty of Szeged with the crusaders and then returned to Anatolia and retaliated. Ibrahim was forced to sign a treaty with unfavourable terms (called sevgendname). Although after Murat's death Ibrahim allied himself with Venice, he didn't fight against the Ottomans.

== Ibrahim Bey and the other powers ==
Although Mamluks in Egypt supported İsa, Ibrahim's brother against Ibrahim during the early years, Ibrahim and the Mamluks were usually on good terms. However competition over Çukurova (ancient Cilicia) destroyed the friendship. Ibrahim captured the important castle of Corycus in Mediterranean coast (modern Kızkalesi) from the kingdom of Cyprus in 1448. This enabled him to conquer the rest of Çukurova. But Mamluks together with Turkmen beylik of Ramazan which was their vassal attacked on Karamanids in 1456. So Ibrahim gave up hopes to conquer Çukurova.

== Late years and death ==
In his final years, his sons began a struggle for the throne. His designated heir was Ishak, the governor of Silifke. However, his younger son, Pir Ahmed, proclaimed himself Sultan of Karaman in Konya. Consequently, Sultan Ibrahim and his eldest son Ishak sought refuge in Gevale Castle near Konya; however, Ibrahim died just as they were reaching the fortress.

There are two distinct accounts regarding the death of Sultan Ibrahim. According to the first account, following the Fall of Constantinople, Sultan Ibrahim sent his vizier Ahmed Pasha to congratulate Mehmed II. After delivering the letter, the Ottoman Sultan called Ahmed Pasha aside and gave him poison, promising him the ruler ship of the Karamanid lands if he assassinated Ibrahim Bey. Vizier Ahmed Pasha subsequently poisoned Sultan Ibrahim by placing the toxin inside a cluster of grapes, and Sultan Ibrahim passed away 26 days later. The account by Kıvâmî supports this poisoning narrative described by Şikârî.

The second account states that he died of natural causes.

== Family ==
By a Turkish concubine, he had his elder son and chosen heir, Ishak Bey. Later, Ibrahim ordered to kill Ishak's mother without his son knowledge.

In 1425 he married Ilaldi Sultan Hatun (dead in 1444), a daughter of Ottoman Sultan Mehmed I. The marriage was unhappy, because Ibrahim hated his wife and their sons because their Ottoman blood.

They had six sons, amongs them:

- Piri Ahmed Bey;
- Kasim Bey;
- Kaya Bey, who married his cousin Hafsa Hatun, daughter of Murad II, and had a son, Kasım Bey;
- Alaeddin Bey.
- Karaman Bey.

Additionally, according to some sources, one of Ibrahim Bey’s daughters became the wife of Mehmed II. According to Yılmaz Öztuna, this woman was Gülşah Hatun.

== In popular media ==
- In the 2012 film Fetih 1453, Ibrahim of Karaman is played by Arslan İzmirli. He is depicted as a Bey provoked by Emperor Constantine XI (Recep Aktuğ) to rebel against the Ottoman Empire. Later, he decides to make a peace agreement with Mehmed II (Devrim Evin).
- In Mehmed: Fetihler Sultani, Fahri Öztezcan portrayed Ibrahim Bey. Here, it is shown that her daughter was Gülşah Hatun (Sena Çakir) and that he started his enmity with the Ottoman Empire because Şehzade Mehmed (Serkan Çayoğlu) did not stay with Gülşah on their wedding night.

Regnal titles
Preceded by Bengi Ali	Bey of Karaman; 1424–1464	Succeeded by İshak
