= Turghudlu (tribe) =

Turkmen tribe in Turkey and Iran

Turghudlu was a Turkoman tribe in central Anatolia.

Modern historian Faruk Sümer disputed claims that the tribe was of Tatar or Kipchak origin, citing the Ottoman historian Neşri and Sharaf al-Din Ali Yazdi, who described the tribe as Turkmen or Turkish, and also the Karamanid historian Shikari, who mentioned the tribe's eponymous founder, Turghud Beg, as the leader of the Oghuz or Turkmens. Shikari narrates that when the pastures between Konya and Ankara entered Karamanid rule, these regions were granted to Turghud Beg and Bayburd Beg. Turghudlu was one of the constituent tribes of the Qizilbash groups under Safavid Iran.

== Bibliography ==
- Floor, Willem (2001). Safavid Government Institutions. Costa Mesa, California: Mazda Publishers. ISBN 978-1568591353.
- Sümer, Faruk (2012). "Turgutlular". TDV Encyclopedia of Islam, Vol. 41 (Tevekkül – Tüsterî) (in Turkish). Istanbul: Presidency of Religious Affairs, Centre for Islamic Studies. pp. 420–421. ISBN 978-975-389-713-6.
