= Nure Sofi =

Founding Bey of Karaman from 1250 to 1256

Nurei Sofi
- نورالدین

1st Beg of Karamanid
- Reign: 1250–1256
- Predecessor: Independence from Sultanate of Rum
- Successor: Karaman Bey
- Born: 1197
- Died: 1256 ( aged 59 )
- Issue: Karaman Bey, Zayn al-Hadjdj, Bünsuz, a Daughter
Names
- Nureddin Sofia Bey

Nûre Sûfi Bey (Turkish: Nureddin Bey) was the founder of Karamanid dynasty, a Turkic dynasty which ruled part of Anatolia in the 14th and 15th centuries as a rival of the Ottoman Empire. He was the son of Hodja Sad al-Din (Turkish: Hoca Sadeddin) who had come from Arran, staying for some years near Sivas. This, when generalized, is a reference to the actual migrations brought about by Khwārizmian and Mongol pressure, and moreover it suggests some perceptible connection, if not precisely with Baba Ishak, at least with circles influenced by religious influence of that kind - there is a reference to a Khorasanian Șūfī, Baba Ilyās, with whom both Nûre Sûfi and Baba Ishāq are said to have been in touch - and also to the fact that the first chiefs who brought in these Turkmens were equally leaders in the field of religion.

Nure Sofi was a member of Afşar tribe of Turkmens. Originally living in West Turkmenistan the tribe moved west to Anatolia in 1228 probably to escape from the invading Mongols. They were welcomed by Alaattin Keykubat I of the Sultanate of Rum and they were settled around Ermenek (now a district in Karaman Province) Nure Sofi's original position in the tribe is not known. According to some he was dealing with coal trade between Ermenek and the Seljuk cities to the north But he soon proved himself as a leader during Babai Revolt in which he was the partisan of Baba İshak. He also captured many small settlements around Ermenek to form the core of the future Karamanoğlu Beylik.

According to historian Shikari, Nûre Sûfi Bey was more interested in Sufi religious matters (he was a disciple of Baba Ilyās) than in politics and military and named his son Kerîmeddin Karaman Bey in commandment in order for him to follow a life of solitude.

He died probably around 1257. His tomb is in Değirmenlik, a location in Mut district of Mersin Province He was succeeded by his son Karaman Bey who assumed full power upon his death.

Nûre Sûfi fathered two other sons: Zayn al-Hadjdj (died in battle in 1262, fighting for Izz al-Din Kaykaus against Rukn al-Din Kaykubad), Bünsuz, and a daughter (who died in 1282).

== See also ==
- Babai Revolt

== Sources ==
- Claude Cahen, Pre-Ottoman Turkey: a general survey of the material and spiritual culture and history c. 1071-1330, translated by J. Jones-Williams (New York: Taplinger, 1968), 281-2.

Regnal titles
New title Independence from the Sultanate of Rum	Leader of the Karamanids; 1250? – 1256	Succeeded by Karaman Bey as Bey of Karaman
