= Karamanname =

Karamanid work of history

Karamannāme
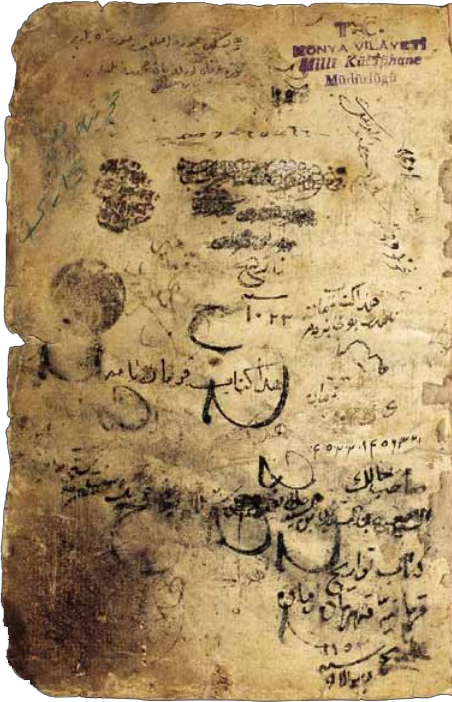
- First page of Karamannāme
- Author: Shikārī
- Language: Old Anatolian Turkish

Karamannāme, also known as Kitāb-i Karamaniyya and Kitāb-i Tevārīh-i Karamaniyya, was the work of history by the anonymous author known as Shikārī (Old Anatolian Turkish: شكاري) issued by the principality of Karaman. Karamannāme bears importance as one of the few works of history dedicated to the Karamanids and independent from the Ottoman tradition. Different from much of the works created in 16th-century Anatolia and vicinity, Karamannāme contains hostile commentary to the Ottoman state and was likely commissioned as a measure against the growing Ottoman influence in Anatolia. The work includes many instances of anachronism and chronological contradictions. It lacks any dates or years as part of its narrative, and it is also unknown when it was written. However, references to Shah Ismail's battles with the Khanate of Bukhara indicate that the work took its final form by the mid-16th century. Karamannāme mainly used poet Yarjānī's earlier Persian Shāhnāma as its source, which was written at ʿAlāʾ al-Dīn Beg's command.

Written in simple Anatolian Turkish and with the Anatolian population as its audience, Karamannāme resembles a compilation of dastans instead of a history book. It first describes how Karaman Beg and his sons appeared as heroic figures in the border region between the Sultanate of Rum and the Armenian Kingdom of Cilicia. The life and rule of ʿAlāʾ al-Dīn Beg occupies the largest portion of the work, including his childhood, education, conquests, and relations with other rulers. ʿAlāʾ al-Dīn's brother-in-law, the Ottoman Sultan Bayezid I later attacks the Karamanids, having allegedly betrayed and killed him. The text rushes through the rule of his successors and the Ottoman annexation of the Karamanid domains. The narrative ends when the heir to the Karamanid throne is poisoned by the Ottomans, after which a Karamanid commander chooses to side with Shah Ismail. Like the state's rise, the work examines the reasons behind why the principality ceased to exist and underlines the illegitimacy of the Ottomans.

== Author ==
The exact identity of the author of Karamannāme remains unknown. The only portion of the work that reveals the pen name of the author is the last couplet of the introduction:

Eğer bilmek dilersen bu gubârı (If you wish to know this speck of dust)
Ayaklar toprağı ya'nî Şikârî (He is the dirt beneath your feet, that is Shikārī)

There were three people who went by the name Shikārī in the 16th-century Ottoman tezkire. Among them, Ahmed, the son of Hasan Bey, who was the defterdar and later mirliva of Diyarbekir, is suggested by some scholars to have been the author of the work.

== Bibliography ==
- Lindner, Rudi Paul (12 July 2017). Nomads and Ottomans in Medieval Anatolia. Taylor & Francis.
- Sümer, Faruk (1978). "Ḳarāmān-Og̲h̲ullari̊". In van Donzel, E.; Lewis, B.; Pellat, Ch. & Bosworth, C. E. (eds.). The Encyclopaedia of Islam, Second Edition. Volume IV: Iran–Kha. Leiden: E. J. Brill. ISBN 978-90-04-05745-6. OCLC 758278456.
- Yıldız, Sara Nur (2010). "Şikârî". TDV İslâm Ansiklopedisi (in Turkish). TDV İslâm Araştırmaları Merkezi.
