= Ibrahim I of Karaman =

Beg of Karaman 1318 to 1332 and 1340 to c. 1350

Ibrahim Beg
- بدر الدين

Beg of Karamanid
- Reign: 1318–1332
- Predecessor: Musa Bey
- Successor: Halil Bey
- Reign: 1340–1349
- Predecessor: Halil bey
- Successor: Ahmet Bey
- Born: 1282
- Died: 1349 (aged 67)
- Issue: Ahmet bey
- Father: Mahmut Bey
- Religion: Sunni Islam

Ibrahim I was a bey of the Karamanids, a Turkoman principality in Anatolia in the 14th century.

His father was Mahmut Bey. His elder brother Musa had succeeded Mahmut in 1312. But soon Ibrahim laid claim to throne and rebelled in 1318. Although the details of the civil war are not known, according to Ibn Battuta, the famous Arabian traveller who acted as Ibrahim's envoy to Mamluk Sultanate of Egypt, he won the throne with the help of Mamluks. Between 1332 and 1340 he abdicated on behalf of his brother Halil. Upon Halil's death however, he resumed his former title. His death date is not certain. But he died no sooner than 1343 when he campaigned to Armenian Kingdom of Cilicia.

Regnal titles
Preceded by Musa Bey	Bey of Karaman; 1318–1332	Succeeded by Halil Bey
Preceded by Halil Bey	Bey of Karaman; 1340 – c. 1350	Succeeded by Ahmet bey
