= Ishak of Karaman =

Beg of Karaman from 1464 to 1465

Ishak of Karaman was a bey of the Karamanids, a Turkish principality in Anatolia in the 15th century.

He succeeded his father Ibrahim Bey in 1464. His mother was Turkish concubine, who Ibrahim later ordered to kill without Ishak's knowledge. He was the legal heir to throne, and his brothers opposed him. At the time of his father's death, he was a local governor in Silifke. When he tried to march to his capital Konya, he learned that his younger brother Pir Ahmet had put a claim on the throne. This resulted in an interregnum in the beylik. The help of Uzun Hasan, the sultan of Akkoyunlu (White Sheep) Turkmens enabled him to ascend to the throne, albeit for a short reign. Because, Pir Ahmet appealed to Ottoman sultan Mehmet II for help. He offered Mehmet some territory which Ishak refused to cede. With Ottoman help, Pir Ahmet defeated Ishak in the battle of Dağpazarı. Ishak had to be concerned with Silifke for an unknown time. The Karamanids principality soon fell to the Ottomans.

Regnal titles
Preceded by Ibrahim Bey	Bey of Karaman; 1464–1465	Succeeded by Pir Ahmet Bey
