= Alaiye =

City-state in Anatolia from 1293 to 1471

Coordinates: 36.545669°N 31.99813°E

Beylik of Alaiye Alanya Beyliği
- 1293–1471
- Flag

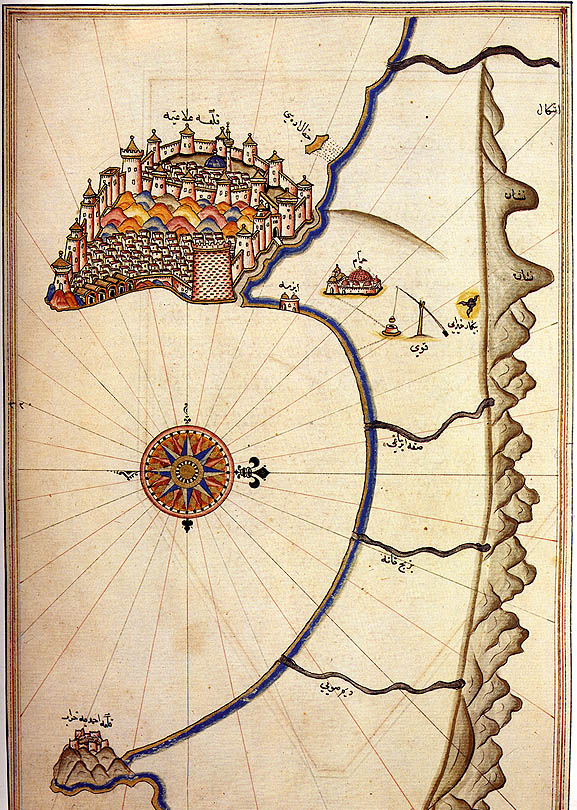
- Piri Reis map of Alanya from 1525, shortly after the beylik was incorporated into the Ottoman Empire.
- Capital: Alanya
- Common languages: Turkish
- Religion: Sunni Islam
- Government: City-state
- Bey
- History
  - Collapse of the Sultanate of Rum: 1293
- 1471
  - Annexation by the Ottoman Empire: 1471
Preceded by	Succeeded by
Sultanate of Rum	Ottoman Empire
- Today part of: Turkey

Alaiye (علائیه) is the medieval Seljuq name for Alanya (on the southern coast of Turkey). It refers to the Turkish city-state in a specific period and the beylik (principality) which developed around there, at times under the Karamanid dynasty. After the 1242 Battle of Köse Dağ, the Seljuqs lost control of the city, and it became semi-autonomous.

== Occupations ==
Before the influence of the Karamanid dynasty, Henry II of Jerusalem made an unsuccessful attempt to invade the city in 1291. Karamanids influence then began in 1293, with the capture of the beylik by Majd ad-Din Mahmud (Turkish: Mecdüddin Mahmud). In 1427, the Mamluk Sultan Al-Ashraf Sayf Addin Barsbay acquired the beylik from the Karamanid Sultan Damad II İbrahim Bey in exchange for 5,000 gold coins. In 1366, an attempt to occupy the beylik by Peter I of Cyprus was unsuccessful.

== Governance ==
The beylik existed as an independent principality in some form from 1293 until 1471. The second rule of Kayqubad III was centered there. The Ottoman general Gedik Ahmed Pasha's victory against Kasim Bey and the Karamanids also happened in Alaiye. During this period no major state existed in Anatolia, following the defeat of the Seljuq Sultanate of Rûm by the Mongol Empire at the Battle of Köse Dag.

Following minor Christian incursions in the region in 1371, Badr ad-Din Mahmud Bey, an emir of the Karamanids built a mosque and medrese in 1373–1374 in the city.

== Ruler list ==
- Mecdüddin Mahmud (1293–?)
- Yusuf (1330–1337)
- Şemseddin Mehmed (1337–1352)
- Hüsameddin Mahmud
- Savcı Bey ( – 1423)
- Karaman Bey
- Lütfi ( – 1455)
- Kılıç Arslan (1455 – 1471)
