= Mehmed II of Karaman =

Beg of Karaman from 1398 to 1399, 1402 to 1420, and 1421 to 1423

Nasireddin Mehmed II Beg
- سلطانزاد ناصر الدين
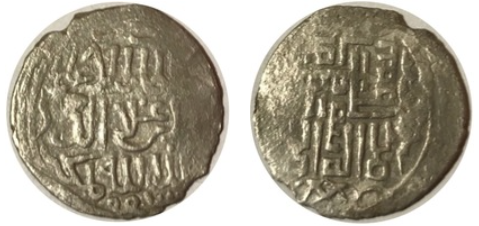

Beg of Karamanid
- Reign: 1398–1399
- Predecessor: Alaattin Ali of Karaman
- Successor: Ottoman rule
- Reign: 1402–1420
- Predecessor: Ottoman rule
- Successor: Alaattin Ali II of Karaman
- Reign: 1421–1423
- Predecessor: Alaattin Ali II of Karaman
- Successor: Ibrahim II of Karaman
- Born: 1379
- Died: 1423 (aged 44)
- Father: Alaattin Ali of Karaman
- Mother: Nefise Melek Sultan Hatun

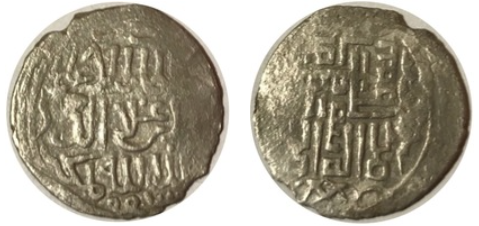

Nasiraeddin Mehmed II of Karaman, also Mehmed Beg (Turkish: Mehmet Bey), Mehmed Beg II or Nasir al-Din Mehmed Beg (1379 – 1423) was the Bey ruler of Karaman. His mother was Nefise Hatun, a daughter of Ottoman Sultan Murad I.

== Karamanids ==
Karamanid was a Turkmen state in central Anatolia after the disintegration of Seljuq Sultanate of Rûm. The capital of Karamanid state was usually Karaman (ancient Larende, renamed by the Karamanids) and sometimes Konya and other cities as well. It was the main rival of the rising Ottoman Empire. The opponents of the Ottoman Turks in Eastern Europe usually sought for alliances with Karamanid to catch Ottomans between two fires.

== Background ==
While Sultan Bayezid I of the Ottoman Empire was in Rumeli in 1398, Mehmet's father Alaattin Ali raided Ankara, an important Ottoman city. Beyazıt returned to Anatolia, defeated and killed Mehmet's father. Then he laid a siege on Karaman. Mehmet and his brother Bengi Ali surrendered on the condition that the citizens of Karaman would not be punished. Beyazıt jailed both princes in Bursa, the co-capital of the Ottoman Empire. But four years later, he himself was defeated by Timur in the battle of Ankara and Bursa was captured by Timur's grandson who released Mehmet and his brother.

== First reign ==
Following his release, Mehmet returned to Karaman as the bey of Karamanid state. In addition to his father's possessions, he was given a few forts by Timur and soon he began increasing his territory. During the interregnum caused by Timurlane's devastations, Mehmet began occupying Ottoman and Germiyanids (an ally of Ottomans ). In particular he captured Kütahya the capital of Germiyanids. (The bey of Germiyan was the father in law of the former Ottoman sultan Bayezid I).

The Ottoman interregnum ended in 1413 when Mehmed I defeated Musa Çelebi in Rumeli. After the victory, Mehmed I returned to Anatolia and defeated Karamanids in 1414. Mehmet II agreed to give all Ottoman territory (the forts given by Temur and the cities annexed by himself) back. Although he tried to infringe the treaty in 1415 he was arrested and had to swear an oath never to infringe again. He kept his promise and peace prevailed between the Ottoman Empire and the Karamanids during 1415-1422 period.

But Mehmet II continued to fight in other fronts. He allied himself with the Ramadanids (a small lordship) in Çukurova (South Turkey, Cilicia of the antiquity) and began fighting against the Dulkadirids, a vassal of Egyptian Mamluks in south east Anatolia. In 1420, he was captured near Kayseri by the Mamluks and was jailed in Cairo, Egypt.

== Second reign and death ==
After the Mamluk sultan died in 1421, Mehmet was released. He returned to Karaman where he declared himself the bey of Karaman. He ruled on the former Karaman territory with the exception of Niğde, where his brother ruled.

In 1421, Mehmet I of the Ottoman Empire died, and soon the war between the Ottomans and the Karamanids was renewed. Early in 1423, Mehmet II attempted to take Antalya, a port in south west Anatolia, from the Ottomans. Probably he thought that the new Ottoman sultan Murad II who just survived two rebellions (by his uncle and younger brother) wouldn't fight for the port far from his capital. However, the governor of Antalya was able to defend the city. During the battle Mehmet was killed and his sons lifted the siege.

== Issue ==
Mehmet had four sons:

- Ibrahim II of Karaman (d.16 July 1464). In 1425 he married Ilaldi Sultan Hatun, a daughter of the Ottoman Sultan Mehmed I. They had six sons and one of them married his cousin Hafsa Hatun, Murad II's daughter.
- Mahmud Bey of Karaman.
- Isa Bey of Karaman (d.1437). In 1427 he married Incu Hatun, a daughter of the Ottoman Sultan Mehmed I.
- Alaeddin Ali Bey of Karaman. In 1427 he married Ayşe Hatun, a daughter of the Ottoman Sultan Mehmed I.

== Trivia ==
According to a legend, in 1415 when Mehmet II was to forced to swear an oath, he hid a pigeon under his shirt and holding the pigeon he promised that as long as this life continues, there will be no assault to Ottoman lands.

Regnal titles
Preceded by Alaattin Ali	Bey of Karaman; 1398–1399	Succeeded by Ottoman rule
Preceded by Ottoman rule	Bey of Karaman; 1402–1420	Succeeded by Bengi Ali
Preceded by Bengi Ali	Bey of Karaman; 1421–1423	Succeeded by İbrahim II
