= Karim al-Din Karaman =

Beg of Karaman from 1257 to 1261

Ḳarāmān Beg
- کریم الدین

Beg of Ḳarāmān
- Reign: 1257–1261
- Predecessor: Nūre Ṣūfī
- Successor: Shams al-Dīn Meḥmed
- Born: 1221
- Died: 1263 (aged 42 )
- Issue: Mehmet I; Güneri; Maḥmūd; Tānū; Zakariyyā; Alī
- House: Ḳarāmān
- Father: Nūre Ṣūfī (Note: Also known as Nūr al-Dīn Ṣūfī.)
- Religion: Islam

Karim al-Dīn Ḳarāmān Beg was a Turkoman chieftain who ruled the Karamanids in the 13th century. Ḳarāmān Beg's emergence coincides with the defeat of the Sultanate of Rum by the Mongol Empire in 1256 and the tension between Kaykaus I and his rival brother Kilij Arslan IV, which allowed local lords living along the boundaries of the state to exercise some autonomy.

== Early life ==
He was the son of Nûre Sûfî Bey, a Turkish leader from Arran, who established himself in the Taurus Mountains near Larandia and who became a Seljuk vassal. Some time before 1256, Karaman Bey officially succeeded his father (who had already left him the effective power several years prior in order to pursue a life in seclusion). In about 1260 Karaman makes his first appearance in the Isaurian-Cilician Taurus regions.

Although the points of detail can probably never be determined, it can be accepted that Karaman started life as a woodcutter and timber merchant who brought supplies from the western Taurus to the little town of Laranda.

== Rise to power ==
In the struggle between Izz al-Din Kaykaus (1246–1260) and his rival Kilidj Rukn al-Din Arslan IV Karaman supported the first. But Kilidj Rukn al-Din Arslan with the help of Parvaneh (Parvana) Sulayman Muin al-Din who was the one who had the real power, and the Mongols, managed to eliminate most of the hostile emirs or begs, but could not capture or kill Karaman and thus, tried to appease him by granting him Larandia and Ermenek and by giving his brother Buñsuz the position of amir djandar in Konya. The fall of Izz al-Din is said to have been one of the causes and possibly was the occasion of or pretext for his uprising. Izz al-Din was regarded, relatively speaking, as an ally of the Turcomans against the Mongols, and the efforts of Rukn al-Din to win the support of the Karamanids were in vain.

Karaman Bey expanded his territories by capturing castles in Ermenek, Mut, Ereğli, Gülnar, Mer and Silifke. The year of the conquests as indicated in the Encyclopedia of Islam (vol. IV, page 643) is 1225, during the reign of Ala al-Din Kaykubadh I (1220–1237), which seems excessively early. Karaman Bey's conquests were mainly at the expense of the Kingdom of Lesser Armenia (and perhaps at the expense of Rukn al-Din Kilidj Arslan IV, 1248–1265). He fought against the Armenians on the Isaurian-Cilician borders to such extent that King Hethum I (1226–1269) had to place himself voluntarily under the sovereignty of the great Khan, in order to protect his kingdom from Mamluks and Seljuks (1244). King Hethum I had to intervene several times, and succeeded in repulsing Karaman.

He founded his beylik which was already semiautonomous during his father's reign. The Seljuks, who were their nominal suzerains, were defeated by the Mongols and the Karamans had no problem to settle in the northern slopes of the Toros Mountains close to Konya, the Seljuk capital. The Seljuk Sultan, afraid of the Karamans increasing power, gave him some towns as ikta ( fief) . The city of Karaman (ancient Larende) bears his name. Karaman fought against the Armenian Kingdom of Cilicia and expanded his territory.

== Conflict with the Seljuqs ==
Good relations between the Seljuqs and the Karamanids did not last. In 1261, on the pretext of supporting Kaykaus II who had fled to Constantinople as a result of the intrigues of the chancellor Pervâne, Karaman Bey and his two brothers, Zeynül-Hac and Bunsuz, marched toward Konya, the capital of Seljuqs, with 20,000 men. A combined Seljuq and Mongol army, led by the chancellor Mu'in al-Din Suleyman, the Pervane, defeated the Karamanid army and captured Karaman Bey's two brothers.

== Last battle ==
In 1261 Kılıç Aslan IV of Seljuks more or less regained strength after his elder brother took refuge in the Byzantine Empire. He began punishing rebellious tribes. Seeing this restoration as a threat to his beylik and anticipating a blow from the sultan, Karaman Bey took initiative by a surprise attack to Konya. But he was defeated in the battle of Gevele (west of Konya). Both of his brothers were killed and he escaped to his territory. It is believed that he died shortly after the battle. He was succeeded by Mehmet I.

According to the Armenian chroniclers, in one of the battles against king Hethum at the fort Meniaum (probably Mennan near Ermenek) his brother Buñsuz and his brother-in-law were killed (information which is in contradiction to other sources that say that Buñluz who was amir djandar in Konya was jailed after the death of Karaman), and he himself was wounded and died shortly after, about 1262. Also, some of his children and members of his family were taken prisoners and held in the Gevele fortress near Konya. The central authority was to some extent re-established, at least in Ermenek, where, until 1276, an official Seljukid governor held office without any recorded difficulties.

== Resting place ==
Karaman is supposedly buried in Nalkasun near Ermenek, but according to the inscription on the tomb, it belongs to his son Mehmed. He was buried in Balkusan (now a village in Ermenek district of Karaman Province) His children were freed by Pervane Muin al-Din Sulaymab upon Sultan Kilidj Arslan IV's death in 1265, except his second son, Ali Beg who remained as hostage in Kayseri. Mehmed would regain power in 1276 in Ermenek.

== Family ==
His sons were Shams al-Dīn Meḥmed, ʿAlī, Tānū, Maḥmūd, Zakariyyā, and Güneri.

== Bibliography ==
- Claude Cahen, Pre-Ottoman Turkey: a general survey of the material and spiritual culture and history c. 1071-1330; trans. J. Jones-Williams. New York: Taplinger, 1968; pp. 281-2.
- H. Konyale, Karaman tariki. Istanbul, 1967
- Sümer, Faruk (2012). "Ḳarāmān-Og̲h̲ullari̊". In Bearman, P.; Bianquis, Th.; Bosworth, C. E.; van Donzel, E.; Heinrichs, W. P. (eds.). Encyclopaedia of Islam. Vol. II. E. J. Brill.

Regnal titles
Preceded by Nure Sofi as Leader of the Karamanids	Bey of Karaman; 1257–1261	Succeeded by Mehmet I
