= Kasım of Karaman =

Beg of Karaman from 1474 to 1475

Kasım
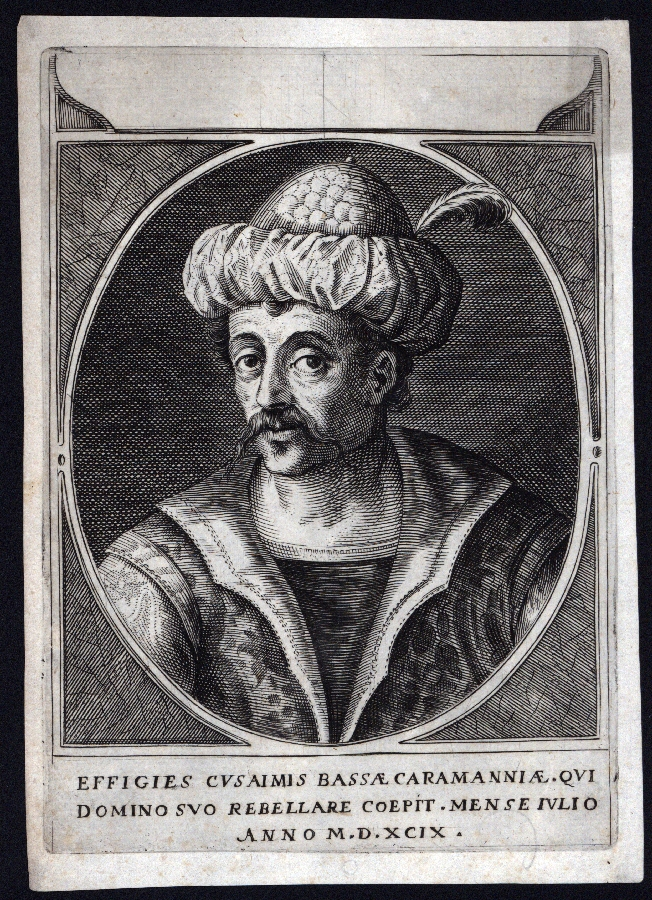
- A portrait made by Dominicus Custos in 1560.

Beg of Karaman
- Reign: 1474-1483
- Predecessor: Pir Ahmed
- Successor: II. Mahmud
- Born: 1428-1430
- Died: 1483
- House: Karamanids
- Father: Ibrahim II of Karaman
- Mother: Ilaldi Sultan Hatun
- Religion: Sunni Islam

Kasım of Karaman (died 1483) was the last bey of the Karaman Beylik, a Turkish principality in Anatolia in the 15th century. He was son of Ibrahim II of Karaman and Ilaldi Sultan Hatun, daughter of Ottoman Sultan Mehmed I. In 1482, he besieged Konya alongside Cem Sultan. Europeans referred to him as the King of Greater Karaman and Cilicia.

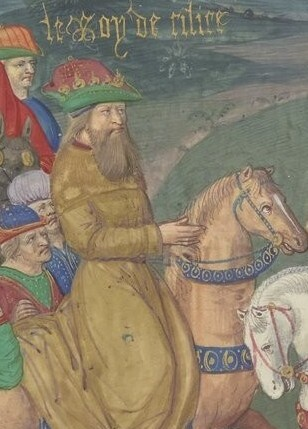
Guillaume Caoursin's depiction of Kasım as he meets with Cem Sultan.

== Reign ==
After a brief reign, his brother Pir Ahmet Bey lost most his beylik (principality) to the Ottoman Empire, and both brothers escaped to Akkoyunlu Turkmen's territory. With Akkoyunlu support they tried to regain their former possessions. Although they weren't able to regain their losses, Kasım allied himself with Republic of Venice, and with the help of a Venetian navy, he was briefly able to keep Silifke and the Mediterranean coast of the beylik. However, following the campaigns of Gedik Ahmed Pasha of the Ottoman Empire, he lost all of his possessions in 1475.

Nevertheless, during the Ottoman Interregnum following the death of the Ottoman sultan Mehmed II, Kasım allied himself with Cem Sultan and almost reconstructed the former Karaman beylik. However Cem was defeated by his brother Bayazıt II. After Cem escaped and took refuge with the Knights of Rhodes, Kasım acknowledged Ottoman suzerainty. He continued as an Ottoman governor in Silike until his death in 1493.

Regnal titles
| Preceded by Pir Ahmet | Bey of Karaman; 1474–1475 | End of beylik |
