= Badr al-Din Mahmud =

Beg of Karaman from 1300 to 1311

Badr al-Dīn Maḥmūd
- بدرالدین
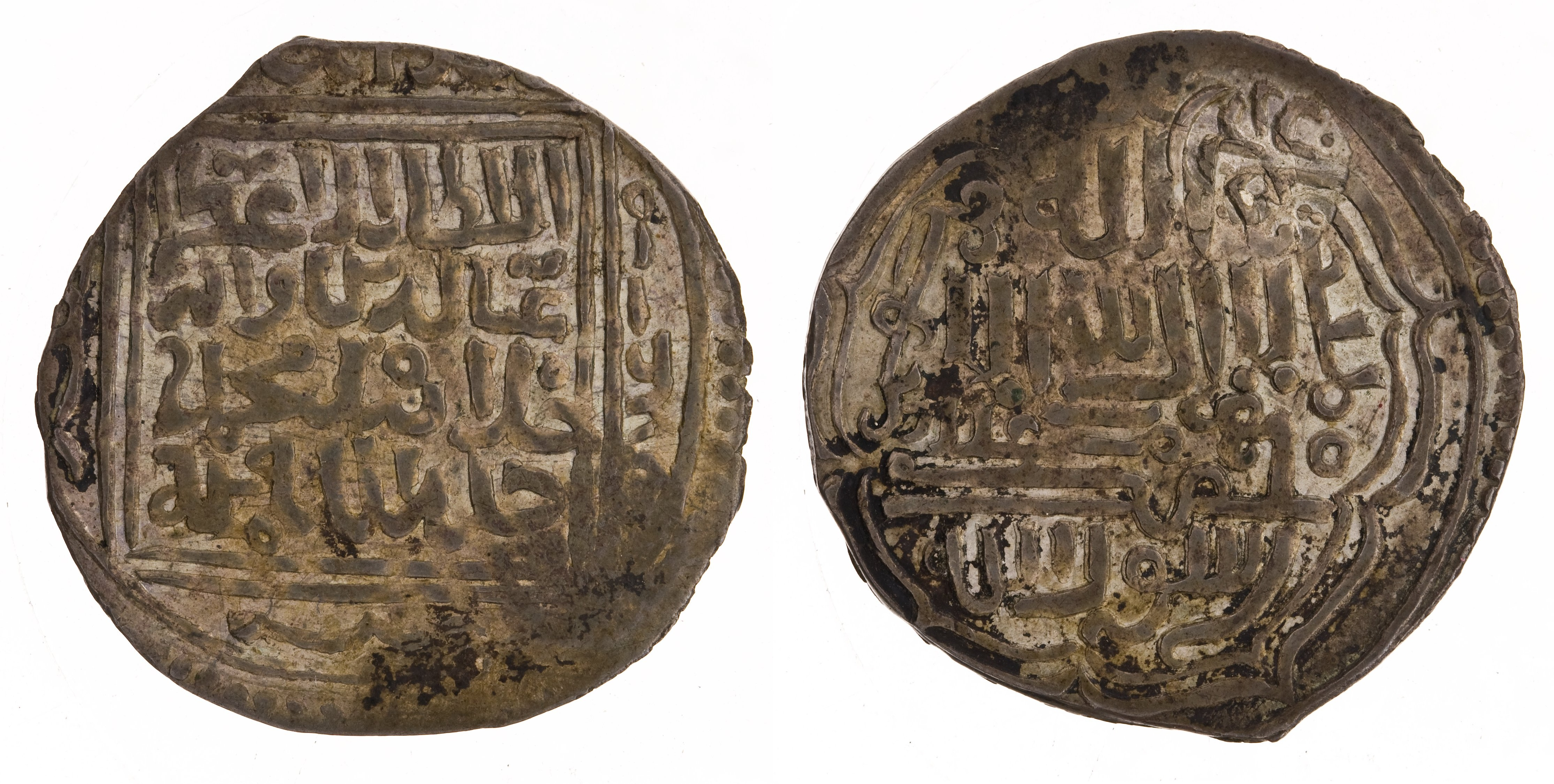
- Silver dirham minted in Alanya

5th Beg of Ḳaraman
- Reign: 1300–1311
- Predecessor: Güneri
- Successor: Musa Bey
- Born: 1259
- Died: 1311 (aged 52)
- House: Ḳarāmān
- Father: Karim al-Dīn Ḳarāmān
- Religion: Islam

Badr al-Din Mahmud (1259–1308) was a bey of Karaman Beylik, a Turkoman principality in Anatolia, 14th century.

His father was Karaman Bey, who succeeded his elder brother Güneri in 1300. Although he is known to have participated in the campaign to Alaiye during Güneri's reign, the details of his exact reign are unknown. After the death of Hethum II in 1307, he took advantage of the weakened Armenian Kingdom of Cilicia and captured some of their territories. But when Seljuk sultan Mesud II died in 1308, he turned back and saw his chance to capture Konya, the Seljuk capital.

He died in 1312. His tomb is in the Balkusan village in Ermenek district of Karaman Province. He was succeeded by his son Musa.

Regnal titles
Preceded by Güneri	Bey of Karaman; 1300–1311	Succeeded by Musa Bey
