= Eshrefids =

Eshrefids / Eşrefoğulları
- 1280–1326
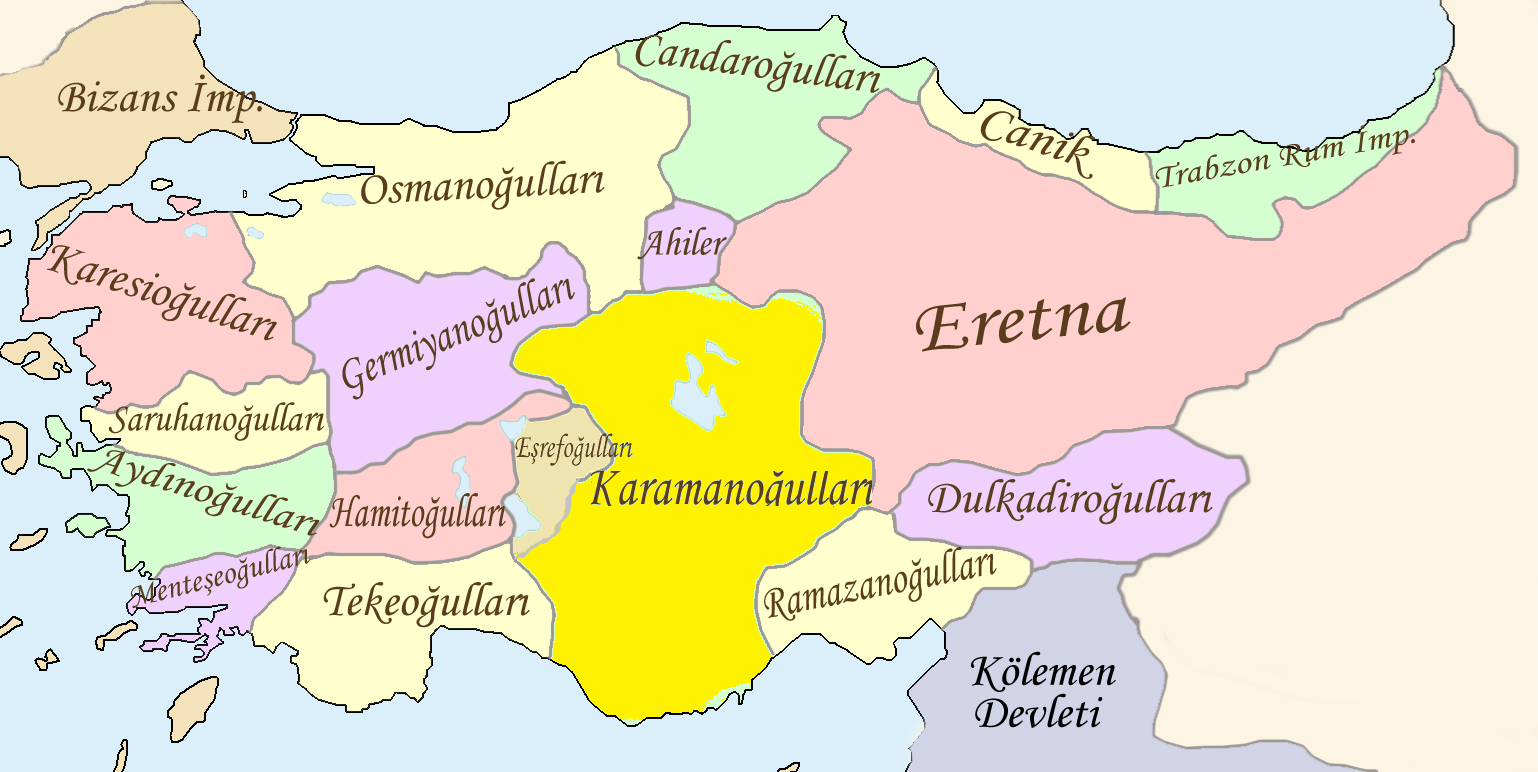
- Capital: Beyşehir
- Common languages: Turkish
- Religion: Sunni Islam
- Government: Emirate
- Bey
  - 1280: Suleiman I ibn Eshref Bey
  - 1326: Suleiman II Bey
- Historical era: Late Medieval
  - Established: 1280
  - Disestablished: 1326
Preceded by	Succeeded by
Sultanate of Rum	Chobanids

The Eshrefids or Ashrafids (Modern Turkish: Eşrefoğulları or Eşrefoğulları Beyliği ) was a 13th-14th century Turkish Anatolian beylik.

== Capital ==
Its capital was in Beyşehir.

== Foundation ==
It was one of the frontier principalities established by Oghuz Turkish clans after the decline of the Seljuk Sultanate of Rum.

== End of dynasty ==
The dynasty ended when Mubariz al-Din Mehmed was executed by Timurtash.

== List of rulers ==
Bey	Reign	Notes
Suleiman I ibn Eshref Bey	1280–1302	Founder of the Eshrefids.
Mubariz al-Din Mehmed Bey	1302–1320	
Suleiman II Bey	1320–1326	

== See also ==
- Eşrefoğlu Mosque

== Literature ==
- Claude Cahen: Pre-Ottoman Turkey, 1969
