= Musa of Karaman =

Beg of Karaman from 1312 to 1332 and 1352 to 1356

Burhanettin Musa
- برهان الدین

6th Beg of Karamanid
- Reign: 1312–1318
- Predecessor: Mahmut Bey
- Successor: Ibrahim
- Reign: 1352-1356
- Predecessor: Şemseddin
- Successor: Suleyman
- Born: 1279; Karamanid Emirate
- Died: 1356 (aged 77); Konya
- Father: Mahmud bey

Musa of Karaman, a.k.a. Hacı Sufi Burhanettin Musa, was a bey of Karaman Beylik, a Turkish principality in Anatolia in the 14th century.

His father was Mahmut Bey. He succeeded his father in 1312. Although he appointed his brother Yahşi as the governor of Konya, the Seljuk capital, Emir Coban, the Mongol commander, captured the city and Musa had to be contended with the former possessions of his beylik. However, he even lost Karaman, his capital city (ancient Larende) to his rebelling brother İbrahim, who was backed by the Mamluk Sultanate of Egypt. According to Ibn Batuta, in 1332 he was ruling only in Ermenek. But in 1352, after a chaos period in the beylik, he was invited to Karaman, where he ruled till 1356. In his last days, he went to battle with the Armenian Kingdom of Cilicia and took many of their territories.

Musa died in 1356 at Konya he was succeeded by his nephew Süleyman

Regnal titles
Preceded by Mahmut Bey	Bey of Karaman; 1312–1332	Succeeded by İbrahim Bey
Preceded by Şemseddin Bey	Bey of Karaman; 1352–1356	Succeeded by Süleyman Bey
