= Candar corps =

Palace guards in Turkish and Islamic states in the Middle Ages

The candar corps (Turkish pronunciation: [ˈdʒandaɾ]) was the name given to palace guards in Turkish and Islamic states in the Middle Ages. Also in Persian and in some Arab states, certain soldier classes were also called candar. They were especially assigned to guard palaces and the heads of state.

In the Great Seljuq Empire, the candar corps consisted of specially trained Turkish and foreign slaves. The head of the candar corps was called Emir-i Candar and he was included in the governing body. After the breakup of the empire, some members of this corps went to the Turkoman beyliks in Anatolia, Shiraz, Khorasan, and through the Mamluks to Yemen and Maghreb states to take up being palace guards.

In Anatolian Seljuqs (Sultanate of Rûm), candars guarded the palace and the head of state and his headquarters, together with the Hassa soldiers. They were cavalrymen, and they would use swords, bows and carry shields. One of these candars who actually was in the Seljuq court, Demir Yaman Candar, founded his own Jandarid principality, near Kastamonu, Turkey.

In the Mamluk palace, the candar corps was as large as a regiment, and was divided into smaller units called nevbe. They had wider authorities and responsibilities, such as accompanying those who would enter the court, accompanying the monarch himself at campaigns to protect him, performing arrests and executions, as well as guarding the prison allocated to political insurgents.

The Ottoman Turks did not have candars at their courts; instead they had set up a different institution to take up their position.
