= Akşehir =

- District and municipality
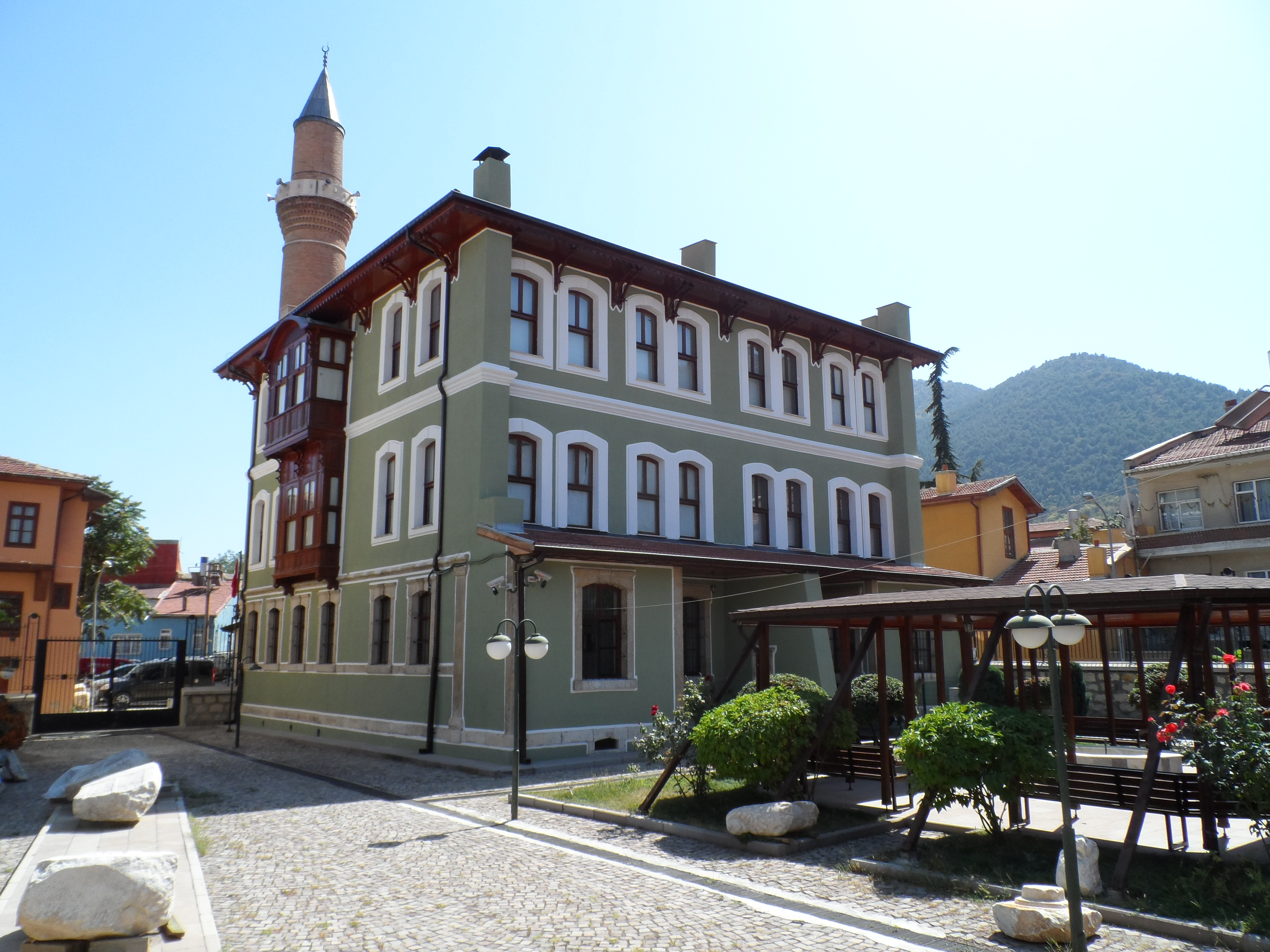
- Akşehir Ethnography Museum

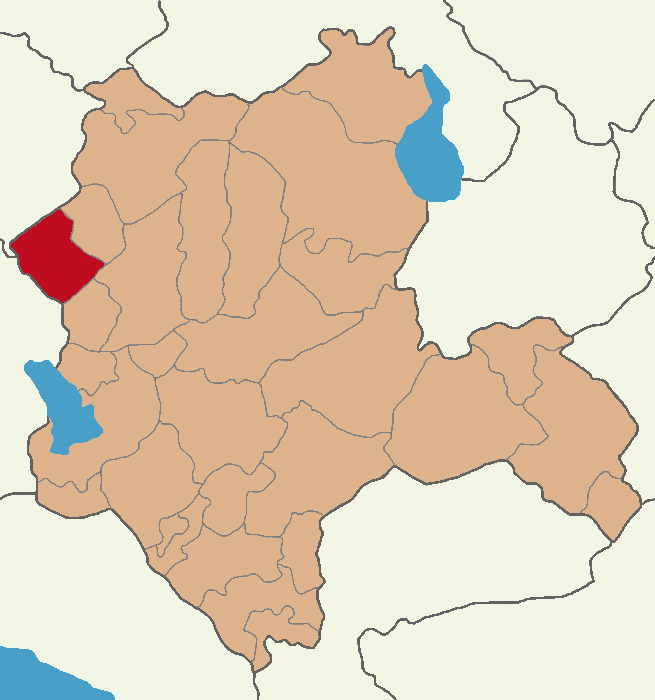
- Map showing Akşehir District in Konya Province

- Location within Turkey Location within Turkey Central Anatolia
- Coordinates: 38°21′27″N 31°24′59″E
- Country: Turkey
- Province: Konya

Government
  - Mayor: Ahmet Nuri Köksal (CHP)
- Area: 895 km^{2} (346 sq mi)
- Elevation: 1,025 m (3,363 ft)
- Population (2024): 93,719
  - Density: 105/km^{2} (271/sq mi)
- Time zone: UTC+3 (TRT)
- Area code: 0332
- Climate: Csa
- Website: www.aksehir.bel.tr

Akşehir is a municipality and district of Konya Province, Turkey. Its area is 895 km^{2} (346 sq mi), and its population is 93,965 (2022). It was known historically as Philomelium.

The town is situated at the edge of a fertile plain, on the north side of the Sultan Mountains. Its elevation is 1,025 m (3,363 ft).

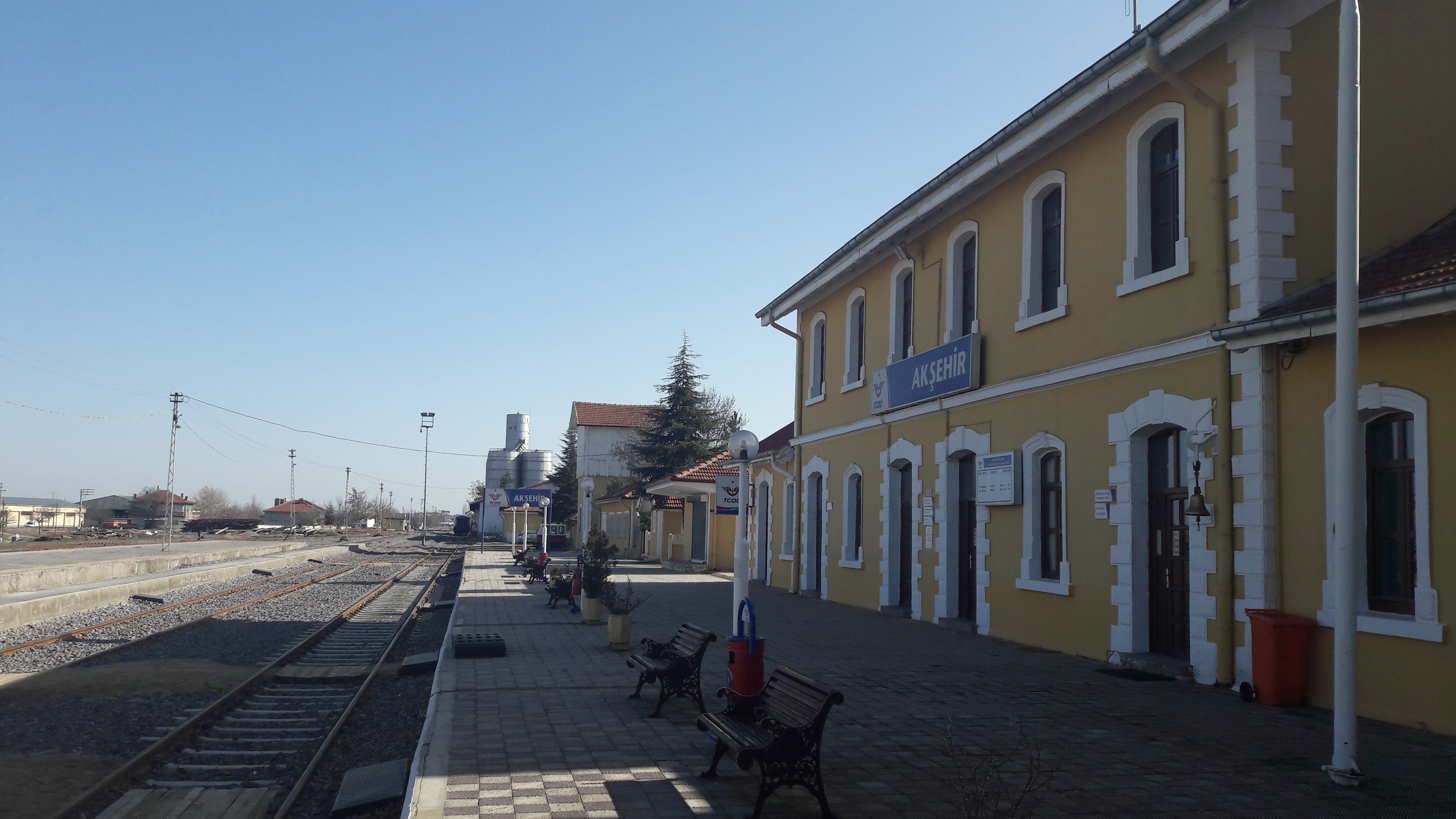

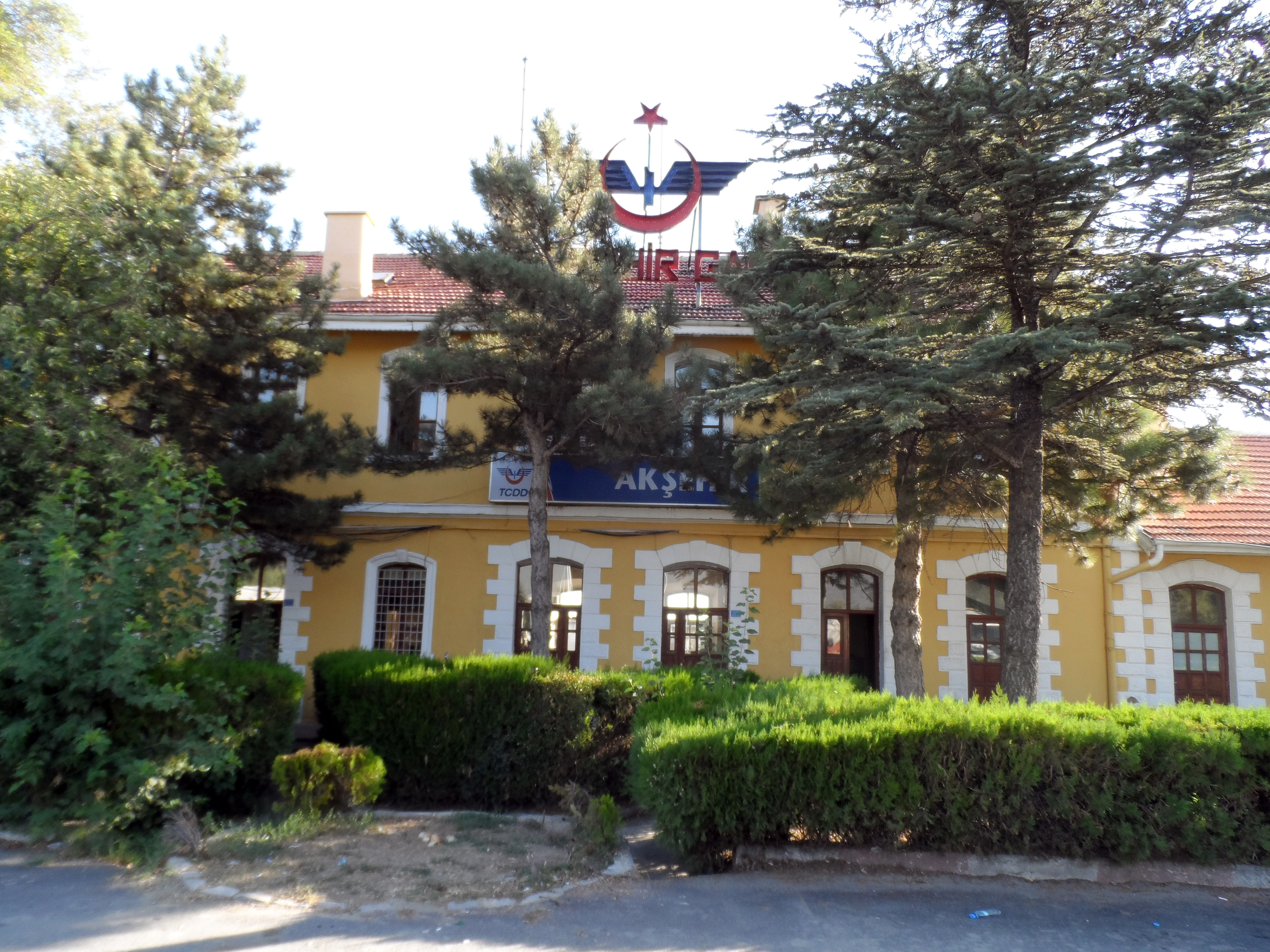

== History ==
Philomelion (Greek: Φιλομήλιον) was probably a Pergamene foundation on the great Graeco-Roman Highway from Ephesus to the east and Cicero, on his way to Cilicia, dated some of his extant correspondence there. St Paul passed the city on his second and third missionary journey in the first century and his impact can be traced by numerous Christian inscriptions in the region. The Smyrniotes wrote the letter that describes the martyrdom of Polycarp to the townspeople of Philomelion. The town became at some point a bishopric and remains a titular see of the Catholic Church.

At some point after 1071, the city fell to the Seljuk Sultanate of Rum. It was retaken by forces of the First Crusade and in 1098 Stephen of Blois met emperor Alexios I Komnenos here, persuading him to not continue his march to Antioch. Alexios returned in one of his final campaigns in 1116 to Philomelion which he conquered and returned with many Greek refugees to Byzantine lands. In 1146, the town was taken by emperor Manuel I Komnenos after defeating forces of the Sultanate of Rum at Akroinon. Manuel burned the town, released several prisoners who had been detained there, and transported the population to Pylae. The town was taken a final time by German members of the Third Crusade in 1190 but rebuilt in 1196 by Kaykhusraw I and resettled with Greek captives taken on a raid from Caria.

It became an important Seljuk town, and late in the 14th century passed into Ottoman hands. It would serve, along with Beyshehir, as the border between the Ottomans and the Karamanid beylik, and the two towns would change hands multiple times until Mehmed II annexed the Karamanid state. There Sultan Bayezid I is said by Ali of Yezd to have died after his defeat at the Battle of Ankara at the hands of Emir Timur.

The town's landmarks include the alleged tomb of Nasreddin Hoca, the tomb of Seydi Mahmut, the house used as headquarters by the Turkish Army during the last phase of the Greco-Turkish War (1919–1922), other monuments and old Turkish houses.

Between 5 July and 10 July each year, commemorations with concerts and other social activities are held to the memory of Akşehir's famous resident, Nasreddin Hodja.

With its architectural heritage, Akşehir is a member of the Norwich-based European Association of Historic Towns and Regions.

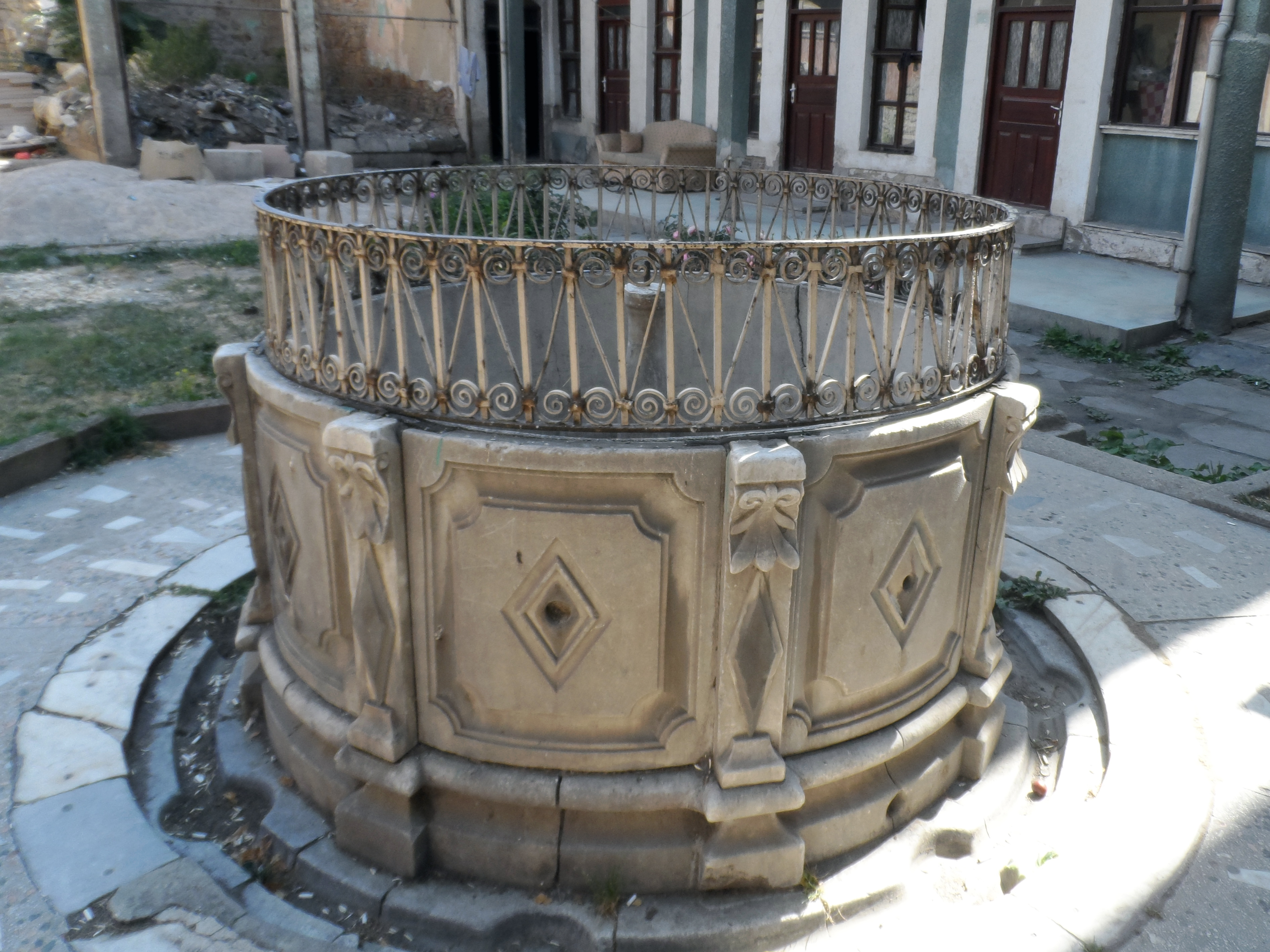
Akşehir Grand Mosque Fountain

== Name ==
The Turkish name Akşehir literally means "white city". It is a compound of two words, namely ak, "white", a Turkic word; and şehir, "town", which is from Persian شهر shahr, "town".

In English usage other spellings of the name include Ak-Shehr, Ak-Shahr, Akshehr, Akshahr, Akshehir, and Aqshahr.

== Composition ==
There are 55 neighbourhoods in Akşehir District:

- Adsız
- Ahicelal
- Alanyurt
- Altunkalem
- Altuntaş
- Anıt
- Atakent
- Bozlağan
- Çakıllar
- Çamlı
- Cankurtaran
- Çay
- Çimendere
- Çimenli
- Değirmenköy
- Doğrugöz
- Engilli
- Eskikale
- Gazi
- Gedil
- Gölçayır
- Gözpınarı
- Ilıcak
- İstasyon
- Karabulut
- Karahüyük
- Kileci
- Kızılca
- Kozağaç
- Kuruçay
- Kuşcu
- Meydan
- Nasreddin Hoca
- Ortaca
- Ortaköy
- Reis
- Sarayköy
- Savaş
- Selçuk
- Seyran
- Söğütlü
- Sorkun
- Tekkeköy
- Tipi
- Tipiköy
- Üçhüyük
- Ulupınar
- Yarenler
- Yaşarlar
- Yaylabelen
- Yazla
- Yeni
- Yeniköy
- Yeşilköy
- Yıldırım Bayezid

== Climate ==
Akşehir experiences a hot-summer Mediterranean climate (Köppen: Csa), with hot, dry summers, and chilly, rainy, often snowy winters.

Climate data for Akşehir (1991–2020)
Month	Jan	Feb	Mar	Apr	May	Jun	Jul	Aug	Sep	Oct	Nov	Dec	Year
Mean daily maximum °C (°F)	5.0 (41.0)	7.4 (45.3)	12.0 (53.6)	17.0 (62.6)	22.0 (71.6)	26.5 (79.7)	30.4 (86.7)	30.6 (87.1)	26.4 (79.5)	20.3 (68.5)	13.2 (55.8)	7.1 (44.8)	18.2 (64.8)
Daily mean °C (°F)	0.8 (33.4)	2.6 (36.7)	6.7 (44.1)	11.3 (52.3)	15.9 (60.6)	19.9 (67.8)	23.4 (74.1)	23.4 (74.1)	19.2 (66.6)	13.7 (56.7)	7.3 (45.1)	2.8 (37.0)	12.3 (54.1)
Mean daily minimum °C (°F)	−2.5 (27.5)	−1.4 (29.5)	2.0 (35.6)	5.8 (42.4)	10.0 (50.0)	13.5 (56.3)	16.2 (61.2)	16.2 (61.2)	12.2 (54.0)	7.9 (46.2)	2.6 (36.7)	−0.6 (30.9)	6.9 (44.4)
Average precipitation mm (inches)	53.66 (2.11)	53.4 (2.10)	58.7 (2.31)	52.01 (2.05)	54.63 (2.15)	42.56 (1.68)	13.92 (0.55)	9.78 (0.39)	21.98 (0.87)	41.09 (1.62)	50.62 (1.99)	69.37 (2.73)	521.72 (20.54)
Average precipitation days (≥ 1.0 mm)	7.5	6.8	7.7	7.5	7.3	5.6	2.8	2.6	3.5	5.2	5.2	8.2	69.9
Average relative humidity (%)	75.9	69.6	62.3	58.4	57.4	54.2	46.5	46.5	50.3	60.5	68.0	75.3	60.4
Mean monthly sunshine hours	90.0	123.0	173.7	206.5	252.8	291.6	338.8	314.7	267.3	196.8	144.4	85.8	2,485.3
Source: NOAA
