= Karamanids =

1250–1487 Turkish beylik in south-central Anatolia

- c. 1255–1487
- The Karamanid beylik and other eastern Mediterranean states in 1450
- Status: De facto independent sultanate (1332-1398, 1402-1474); Rump state (1474-1487); Beylik (1255-1332); Vassal state of Ottoman Sultanate (1398-1402)
- Capital: Larende; Ermenek; Konya (1307–1468); Mut; Ereğli; Silifke (1474-1487)
- Common languages: Old Anatolian Turkish, Persian; Karamanli Turkish (Note: "The secondary literature often mentions that Turkish was made the official language by the Karamanid ruler of south-central Anatolia, Mehmed Beg, on his conquest of Konya in 1277. However, this derives from a statement by the Persian historian Ibn Bibi that was probably intended to discredit Mehmed Beg as a barbaric Turkmen. There is no other evidence that the Karamanids ever used Turkish for official purposes or even much for literary ones.” Andrew Peacock, personal communication, May 10, 2017.)
- Religion: Sunni Islam
- Government: Absolute monarchy
- Sultan
  - c. 1255: Karaman
  - 1483–1487: Mahmud II
- Historical era: Late Medieval
  - Established: c. 1255
  - Battle of Mut: 1260
  - Turkish becomes the official language: 1277
  - Siege of Alanya: 1293
  - Conquest of Konya: 1308
  - Battle of Frenkyazısı: 1386
  - Ottoman-Karamanid War: 1413-1415
  - Annexation of Konya: 1468
  - Disestablished: 1487
Preceded by	Succeeded by
Sultanate of Rum	Ottoman Empire
- Today part of: Turkey

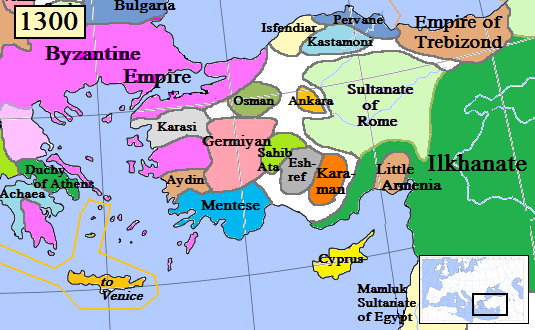
The Beylik of Karaman (orange) in 1300

The Karamanids (Note: Turkish: Karamanoğulları or Karamanîler Also known as the Sultanate of Karaman (Turkish: Karamanoğulları Sultanlığı) Emirate of Karaman, (Turkish: Karamanoğulları Emirliği) and Beylik of Karaman (Turkish: Karamanoğulları Beyliği)) were a Turkish sultanate founded by Karamanlu clan descended from the Oghuz Turks and originating from Salur tribe. Originally a beylik (principality) and later a sultanate (kingdom), the state was located in what is now central Anatolia. From the mid-14th century until its collapse in 1487, the Karamanid dynasty was one of the most powerful states in Anatolia.

== History ==
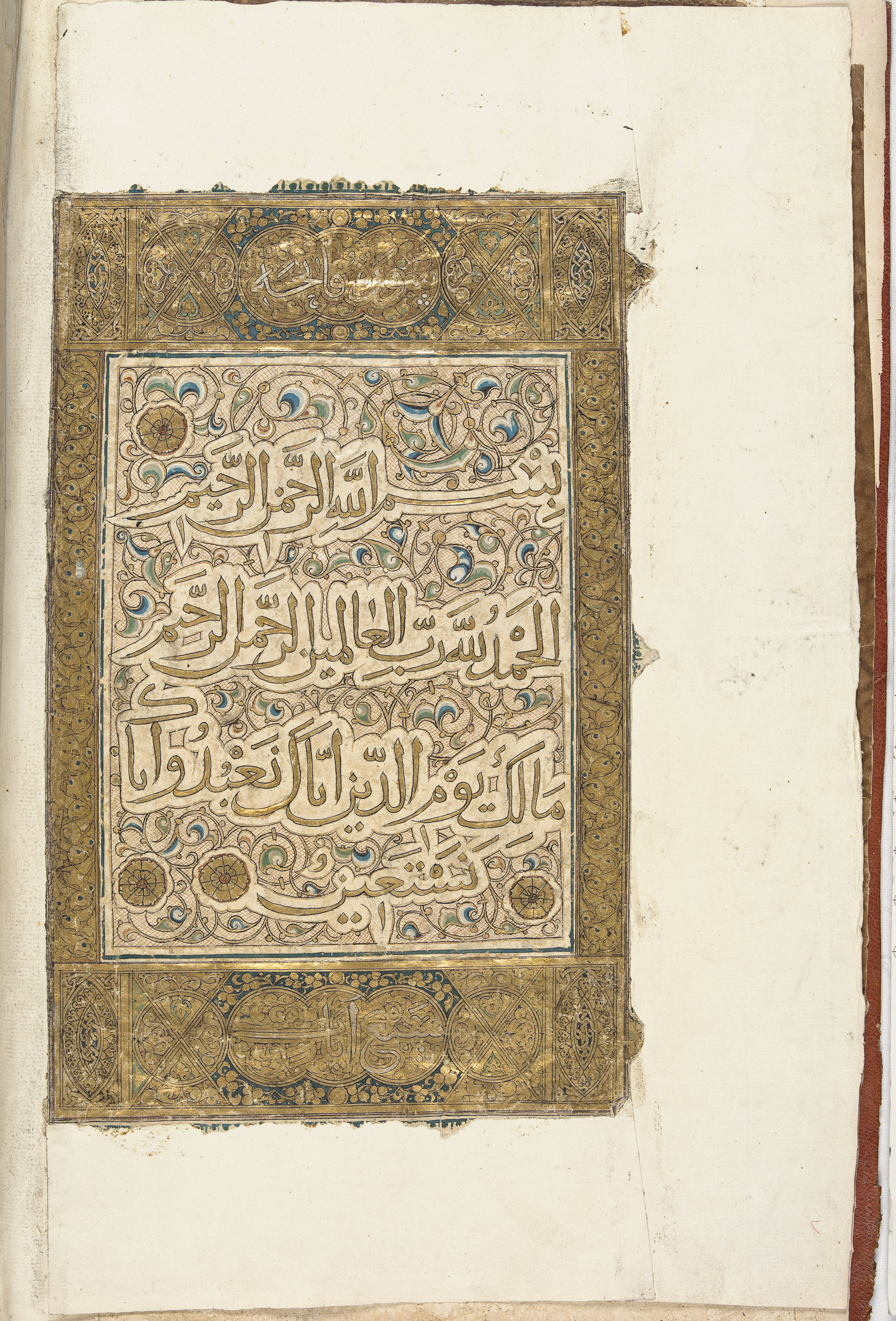
Page from the Quran manuscript made for Halil of Karaman. Konya, 1314. Mevlâna Museum

The Karamanids traced their ancestry from Hodja Sad al-Din and his son Nure Sufi Bey, who emigrated from Arran (roughly encompassing modern-day Azerbaijan) to Sivas because of the Mongol invasion in 1230.

The Karamanids were members of the Karamanlu clan of Salur tribe of Oghuz Turks, who participated in the revolt led by Baba Ishak and afterwards moved to the western Taurus Mountains, near the town of Larende, where they came to serve the Seljuks. Nure Sofi worked there as a woodcutter. His son, Kerîmeddin Karaman Bey, gained tenuous control over the mountainous parts of Cilicia in the middle of the 13th century. A persistent but spurious legend, however, claims that the Seljuq Sultan of Rum, Kayqubad I, instead established a Karamanid dynasty in these lands.

Karaman Bey expanded his territories by capturing castles in Ermenek, Mut, Ereğli, Gülnar, and Silifke. The year of the conquests is reported as 1225, during the reign of Ala al-Din Kaykubadh I (1220–1237), which seems excessively early. Karaman Bey's conquests were mainly at the expense of the Kingdom of Lesser Armenia (and perhaps at the expense of Rukn al-Din Kilij Arslan IV, 1248–1265); in any case it is certain that he fought against the Kingdom of Lesser Armenia (and probably even died in this fight) to such extent that King Hethum I (1226–1269) had to place himself voluntarily under the sovereignty of the great Khan, in order to protect his kingdom from Mamluks and Seljuks (1244).

The rivalry between Kilij Arslan IV and Izz al-Din Kaykaus II allowed the tribes in the border areas to live virtually independently. Karaman Bey helped Kaykaus, but Arslan had the support of both the Mongols and Pervâne Sulayman Muin al-Din (who had the real power in the sultanate).

The Mongolian governor and general Baiju was dismissed from office in 1256 because he had failed to conquer new territories. Still, he continued to serve as a general and appeared, the same year, fighting the Sultan of Rum, who had not paid the tax, and he managed to defeat the sultan a second time. Rukn al-Din Kilidj Arslan IV got rid of almost all hostile begs and amirs except Karaman Bey, to whom he gave the town of Larende (now Karaman, in honour of the dynasty) and Ermenek (c. 1260) in order to win him to his side. In the meantime, Bunsuz, brother of Karaman Bey, was chosen as a Candar, or bodyguard, for Kilij Arslan IV. Their power rose as a result of the unification of Turkish clans that lived in the mountainous regions of Cilicia with the new Turkish population transferred there by Kayqubad.

Good relations between the Seljuqs and the Karamanids did not last. In 1261, on the pretext of supporting Kaykaus II, who had fled to Constantinople as a result of the intrigues of the chancellor Mu'in al-Din Suleyman, the Pervane, Karaman Bey and his two brothers, Zeynül-Hac and Bunsuz, marched toward Konya, the Seljuq capital, with 20,000 men. A combined Seljuq and Mongol army, led by the Pervane, defeated the Karamanid army and captured Karaman Bey's two brothers.

After Karaman Bey died in 1262, his older son, Mehmet I of Karaman, became the head of the house. He immediately negotiated alliances with other Turkmen clans to raise an army against the Seljuqs and Ilkhanids. During the 1276 revolt of Hatıroğlu Şemseddin Bey against Mongol domination in Anatolia, Karamanids also defeated several Mongol-Seljuq armies. In the Battle of Göksu in 1277 in particular, the central power of the Seljuq was dealt a severe blow. Taking advantage of the general confusion, Mehmed Bey captured Konya on 12 May and placed on the throne a pretender called Jimri, who claimed to be the son of Kaykaus. In the end, however, Mehmed was defeated by Seljuq and Mongol forces and executed with some of his brothers in 1278.

Despite these blows, the Karamanids continued to increase their power and influence, largely aided by the Mamluks of Egypt, especially during the reign of Baybars. Karamanids captured Konya on two more occasions at the beginning of the 14th century but were driven out the first time by emir Chupan, the Ilkhanid governor of Anatolia, and the second time by Chupan's son and successor Timurtash. An expansion of Karamanoğlu power occurred after the fall of the Ilkhanids in the 1330s. A second expansion coincided with Karamanoğlu Alâeddin Ali Bey's marriage to Nefise Hatun, the daughter of the Ottoman sultan Murat I, the first important contact between the two dynasties.

As Ottoman power expanded into the Balkans, Aleaddin Ali Bey captured the city of Beyşehir, which had been an Ottoman city. However, it did not take much time for the Ottomans to react and march on Konya, the Karamanoğlu capital city. A treaty between the two kingdoms was formed, and peace existed until the reign of Bayezid I.

Timur gave control of the Karamanid lands to Mehmet Bey, the oldest son of Aleaddin Ali Bey. After Bayezid I died in 1403, the Ottoman Empire went into a political crisis as the Ottoman family fell prey to internecine strife. It was an opportunity not only for Karamanids but also for all of the Anatolian beyliks. Mehmet Bey assembled an army to march on Bursa. He captured the city and damaged it; this would not be the last Karamanid invasion of Ottoman lands. However, Mehmet Bey was captured by Bayezid Pasha and sent to prison. He apologized for what he had done and was forgiven by the Ottoman ruler.

Ramazanoğlu Ali Bey captured Tarsus while Mehmet Bey was in prison. Mustafa Bey, son of Mehmet Bey, retook the city during a conflict between the Emirs of Sham and Egypt. After that, the Egyptian sultan Sayf ad-Din Inal sent an army to retake Tarsus from the Karamanids. The Egyptian Mamluks damaged Konya after defeating the Karamanids, and Mehmet Bey retreated from Konya. Ramazanoğlu Ali Bey pursued and captured him; according to an agreement between the two leaders, Mehmet Bey was exiled to Egypt for the rest of his life.

During the Crusade of Varna against the Ottomans in 1443–44, Karamanid İbrahim Bey marched on Ankara and Kütahya, destroying both cities. In the meantime, the Ottoman sultan Murad II was returning from Rumelia with a victory against the Hungarian Crusaders. Like all other Islamic emirates in Anatolia, the Karamanids were accused of treason. Hence, İbrahim Bey accepted all Ottoman terms. The Karamanid state was eventually terminated by the Ottomans in 1487, as the power of their Mameluke allies was declining. Some were resettled in various parts of Anatolia. Large groups were accommodated in northern Iran on the territory of present-day Azerbaijan. The main part was brought to the newly conquered territories in north-eastern Bulgaria – the Ludogorie region, another group – to what is now northern Greece and southern Bulgaria (present-day Kardzhali region) and Macedonia. Ottomans founded Karaman Eyalet from former territories of Karamanids.

== Power of the Karamanid state in Anatolia ==
Depiction of Karamanid warriors in a 15th-century manuscript of Ahmedi's Iskandar-nama (BnF Turc 309).

According to Mesâlik-ül-Ebsâr, written by Şehâbeddin Ömer, the Karamanid army had 25,000 riders and 25,000 saracens. They could also rely on some Turkmen tribes and their warriors.

Their economic activities depended mostly on control of strategic commercial areas such as Konya, Karaman and the ports of Lamos, Silifke, Anamur, and Manavgat.

== Karamanid architecture ==
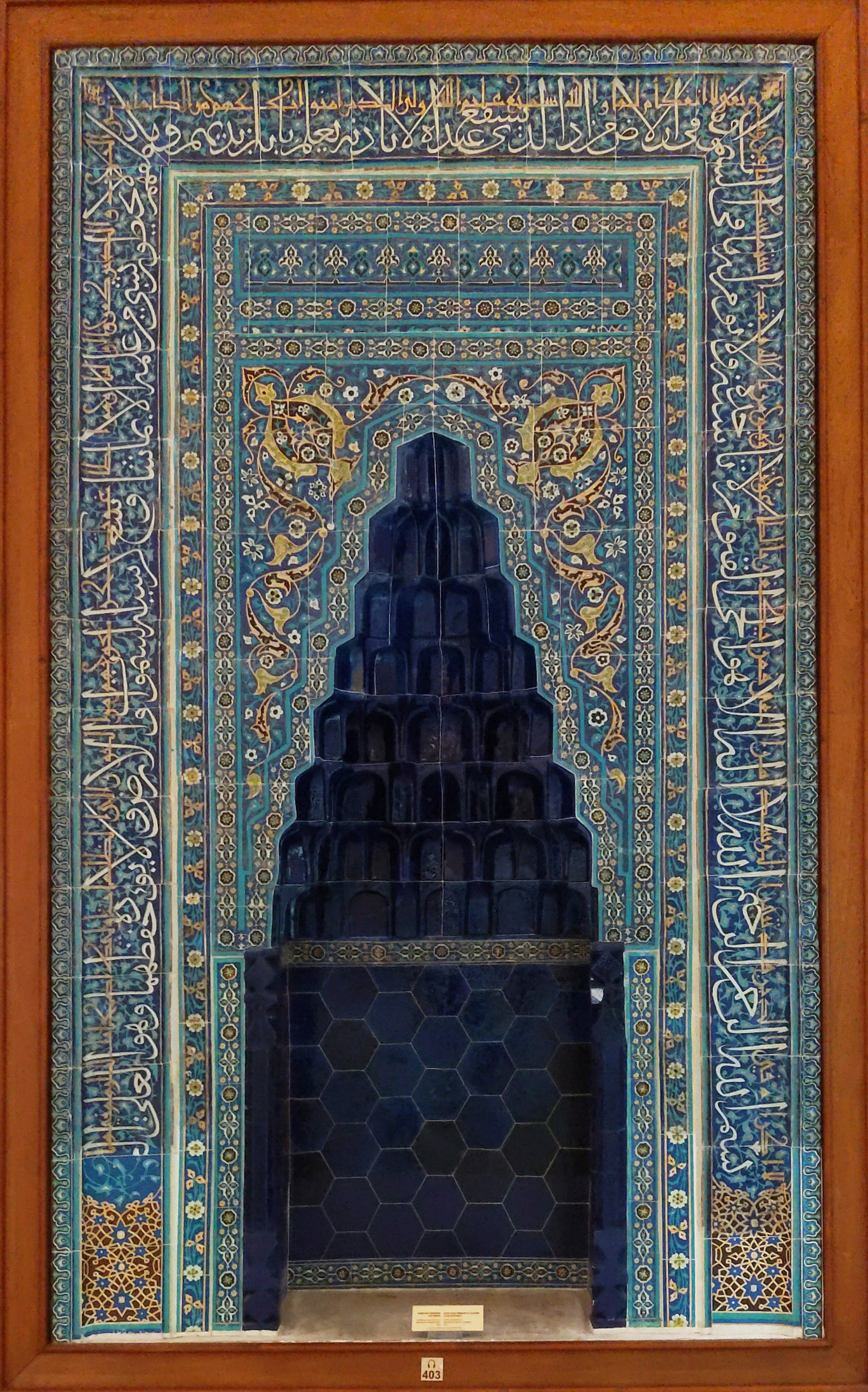
Tiled mihrab niche from the Karamanoglu Ibrahim Bey Imaret, Karaman, now displayed in the Tiled Kiosk of Istanbul

66 mosques, 8 hammams, 2 caravanserais and 3 medreses built by the Karamanids survived to the present day. Notable examples of Karamanid architecture include:

- Hasbey Medrese (1241)
- Şerafettin Mosque (13th century)
- Taşkınpaşa Social Complex (1350)
- İnce Minare (Dar-ül Hadis) Medrese (1258–1279)
- Hatuniye Medrese (Karaman)
- Mevlana Mosque and Tomb in Konya
- Mader-i Mevlana (Aktekke) mosque in Karaman
- Ibrahim Bey Mosque (Imaret) in Karaman
- Bor Ulu Mosque

== Culture ==
Fifteenth-century Burgundian traveler Bertrandon de la Broquière stated that the Karamanid princes were baptized in order to "remove the bad odor".

== List of rulers ==
No.	Name	Reign start	Reign end
1	Nure Sofi	1250	1256
2	Karim al-Din Karaman	1256	1263
3	Mehmed I	1263	1277
4	Güneri Beg	1277	1300
5	Badr al-Din Mahmud	1300	1311
6	Yahshi Khan	1311	1312
7	Haci Sufi Musa	1st: 1312; 2nd: 1352	1st: 1318; 2nd: 1356
8	Ibrahim I	1st: 1318; 2nd: 1340	1st: 1332; 2nd: 1349
9.	Halil	1332	1340
10.	Ahmed I	1349	1350
11	Şemseddin	1350	1352
12	Süleyman	1356	1361
13	Alaattin Ali	1361	1398
14	Erhan	1398	1402
15	Mehmed II	1402	1423
16	Alaatin Ali II	1420	1421
17	Ibrahim II	1423	1464
18	Ishak Beg	1464	1465
19	Pir Ahmed II	1465	1466
20	Kasım Beg	1466	1483
21	Turgutoglu Mahmut II	1483	1487
22	Mustafa Beg (rebellion)	1500	1501

== See also ==
- Karamanlides
- Karaman
- Karaman Province
- Anatolian Turkish Beyliks
- List of Sunni Muslim dynasties
- Caramania

== Sources ==
- Leiser, Gary (2010). "The Turks in Anatolia before the Ottomans". In Fierro, Maribel (ed.). The New Cambridge History of Islam, Volume 2: The Western Islamic World, Eleventh to Eighteenth Centuries. Cambridge: Cambridge University Press. p. 310. ISBN 978-0-521-83957-0. "His ally the Qaramanid Muhammad (r. 660–77/1261–78) did capture Konya in 675/1276 and attempted to replace Persian with Turkish as the official government language."
- Green, Nile (2019). "Introduction". In Green, Nile (ed.). The Persianate World: The Frontiers of a Eurasian Lingua Franca. University of California Press.
- Mehmet Fuat Köprülü (1992). The Origins of the Ottoman Empire. Translated by Gary Leiser. State University of New York Press. ISBN 0-7914-0819-1.
- Vryonis, Speros Jr. (1969–70). "The Byzantine Legacy and Ottoman Forms". Dumbarton Oaks Papers. 23/24: 251–308. doi:10.2307/1291294. JSTOR 1291294.
