= Germiyanids =

Emirate in western Anatolia from c. 1300 to 1429

Germiyan
- 1300–1429
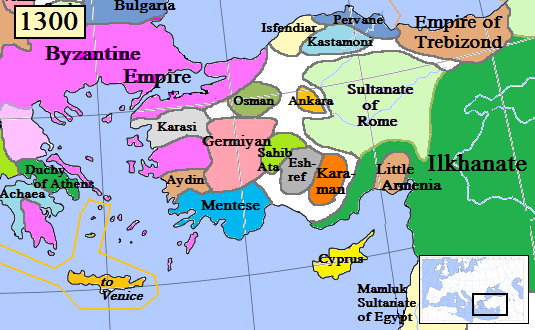
- Beylik of Germiyan (light red) in 1300.
- Capital: Kütahya (c. 1300–1381, 1402–1411, 1414–1429); Kula (1381–1399)
- Common languages: Old Anatolian Turkish
- Religion: Islam
- Government: Monarchy
- Bey
  - 1300–1340: Yakub I
  - 1340–1361: Mehmed
  - 1361–1387: Suleiman
  - 1387–1429: Yakub II
- Historical era: Late Medieval
  - Established: 1300
  - Disestablished: 1429
Preceded by	Succeeded by
Sultanate of Rum; Byzantine Empire	Ottoman Empire

Germiyan, or the Germiyanids (Old Anatolian Turkish: كرميان; Turkish: Germiyanoğulları Beyliği or Germiyan Beyliği), were a dynasty that controlled parts of western Anatolia from c. 1300 to 1429. Germiyan first appeared in the 12th-century chronicles of Matthew of Edessa and The Georgian Chronicles when they fought against the County of Edessa and the Kingdom of Georgia. They reappeared in historical records of 1239 near Malatya, where they were tasked with suppressing the Babai revolt. The tribe relocated to western Anatolia with the encroaching Mongol invasion. During the reign of Yakub I (r. 1300–40), Germiyan gained sovereignty with the demise of the Sultanate of Rum and forged war with the neighboring Ottomans and the Byzantine Empire, which continued during his successor Mehmed's rule (r. 1340–1361).

Amidst political tension caused by the neighboring Karamanids, Suleiman (r. 1361–1387) married his daughter Devletşah Hatun to the Ottoman prince and future sultan, Bayezid I (r. 1389–1402). The process saw a major dowry payment that transferred much of the Germiyanid realm to Ottoman control, including the capital Kütahya. Yakub II (r. 1387–1390, 1402–1411) was initially on friendly terms with the Ottomans but eventually attempted to reclaim the former lands that were lost following his sister's wedding. He was jailed by his brother-in-law Bayezid I in 1390, and Germiyan wholly came under Ottoman control. Nine years later, Yakub escaped from prison and sought the protection of Timur (r. 1370–1405), who, after defeating Bayezid with the help of Yakub at the Battle of Ankara in 1402, restored Germiyan's former boundaries. In 1411, Kütahya fell to Mehmed II of Karaman (r. 1398–1399, 1402–1420), interrupting Yakub's reign a second time. His rule was reinstated by the Ottoman sultan, Mehmed I (r. 1413–1421), upon the defeat of the Karamanids. Although Yakub meddled with the internal conflicts within the Ottomans, the triumph of Murad II (r. 1421–1444, 1446–1451) over his opponents forced Yakub to revert to amicable relations. Yakub lacked male heirs and left the sultanate to Murad II in his will shortly before he died in 1429.

The Germiyanid rule produced many literary and architectural works, and the Germiyanid court was a center of science and artisanship. The architectural remnants of Germiyan include külliyes (building complex), imarets, masjids, türbes (tomb), madrasas (school), and libraries. Several earlier Persian works were translated into Turkish under Germiyanid patronage.

== History ==
=== Background ===
During the 11th century, much of West Asia was subject to Seljuk rule. A branch of the Seljuk dynasty formed the Sultanate of Rum, an Islamic state in Anatolia, which saw its height from the late 12th century to 1237. Germiyan likely came from Kerman or Fars province, and perhaps headed west with the Khwarazmshahs. After the death of Jalal al-Din Mangburni, they remained in the Malatya area.

Germiyan is first mentioned in the 1162 chronicle of the Armenian author Matthew of Edessa in regards to a battle near Azaz in 1119 under the Turkoman lord Ilghazi against the Crusader Joscelin I, Count of Edessa (r. 1118–31). Matthew locates the Germiyan north of the Artuqids near Malatya, indicating their location wasn't "immediately obvious" to his audience. Matthew mentioned Germiyan a second time when Ilghazi gathered Turkmen contingents from the lands of Rum and Germiyan to aid Ghazi, Emir of Ganja, who suffered a decisive defeat against the Kingdom of Georgia in 1122. Germiyan is later attested to in The Georgian Chronicles three times. The Turkmens of Germiyan thus reappeared in 1160 in a joint offensive with the Turkmens of Diyar Bakr against Georgia. In 1185, the Turkmens of Germiyan joined a composite army in Erzurum against Queen Tamar (r. 1184–1213).

The Germiyan first appeared in Islamic sources in 1239 under Kaykhusraw II's rule of the Sultanate of Rum. Muzaffar al-Din, Yakub I's paternal grandfather, was tasked with subduing Baba Ishak's rebellion in the area around Malatya. Kaykhusraw II faced a major defeat by the Mongol Empire at the Battle of Köse Dağ in 1243, which resulted in the vassalization of Rum, which was forced to pay a major annual tax. With the division of the Mongol Empire, Anatolia came under the influence of the Ilkhanate, which was founded by Hulegu Khan (r. 1256–65). Some Turkomans, among whom were the predecessors of Germiyan, migrated to the fringes of the peninsula following Mongol pressure. Amidst the chaos caused by the Anatolian campaign of the Mamluk Sultan Baibars of Egypt in 1277, Ala al-Din Siyavush, commonly known as Jimri, revolted against the Mongols as a pretender to the Seljuk legacy. Husam al-Din, a member of Germiyan, (Note: Husam al-Din was the brother of Yakub I according to İsmail Hakkı Uzunçarşılı.) fought against Jimri and Mehmed of Karaman in western Anatolia. Although Jimri and Mehmed were eliminated, the Karamanids' presence in Anatolia persisted, signaling further division in the region, which was symptomatic of the downfall of the Seljuks.

==== Origins ====
Thirteenth-century Iranian historian Ibn Bibi referred to Germiyan in his Selçukname as Atrak-e Kharazmiyan wa Germiyan (lit. 'Turks of Kharazm and Germiyan') and Turkan-e Germiyan (lit. 'Turks of Germiyan'). Additionally, Ibn Bibi mentioned that the Germiyanid Muzaffar al-Din gathered an army from Kurds and Germiyan to defeat Baba Ishak. Thirteenth-century Syrian historian Izz al-Din ibn Shaddad attested to Ali Shir as Ali Shir al-Turkmani. In his Rihla, 14th-century Maghrebi traveler Ibn Battuta referred to Germiyan as Yazidi, claiming they are rebellious and descended from Yazid I, second Umayyad Caliph (r. 680–83). In his book from 1968, modern historian Claude Cahen suggested a mixed Turkish and Kurdish origin for Germiyan. This theory most likely drew from Ibn Battuta's use of the term Yazidi, which may have not necessarily identified the modern-day Yazidis, a mainly Kurdish-speaking ethnoreligious group primarily inhaibiting northern Iraq and northeastern Syria. Several modern historians have adopted the claim or accepted the possibility put forward by Cahen, while others have disputed or questioned it.

Sixteenth-century Ottoman historians Neshri and Gelibolulu Mustafa Ali claimed that the Germiyanids were Tatars associated with the Chavdar tribe. Later Ottoman historian Ahmed Tevhid repeated this claim. Modern historian İsmail Hakkı Uzunçarşılı dismissed Neshri and Ali's claims as a mistake. On the other hand, Varlık highlights that Neshri and Ali's works lack any such claim, and Ahmed Tevhid and Uzunçarşılı likely misunderstood these texts. Several early modern historians proposed a Kangly-Kipchak origin from Khwarazm based on Ahmed Tevhid and the presence of the Horzum tribe in the region. Nineteenth-century historian Hayrullah Efendi identified the Germiyan with the Afshar tribe, which appears in local oikonyms but lacks clear evidence. Historians, such as Mehmet Fuat Köprülü and Uzunçarşılı, solely relayed Hayrullah Efendi's view in their works.

=== Yakub I (c. 1300 – c. 1340) ===
The Germiyan attempted to declare independence from the Sultanate of Rum when Mesud II became the sultan following the execution of his father, Kaykhusraw III, by the Mongols in 1283. The conflict between the Germiyanids and the Seljuks went dormant upon Mesud II's death, and Yakub agreed to become a vassal of the new ruler, Kayqubad III. At that time, Yakub's realm extended as east as Ankara. His domain included Denizli and Karahisar, according to Nicephorus Gregoras, and Tripolis on the Meander, according to George Pachymeres.

The locations of towns in Anatolia.

Contemporary historian al-Umari described Yakub as the most powerful Turkish emir, being the suzerain of many of his neighbors, with the Byzantine Empire paying him 100,000 pieces of gold each year. Al-Umari further relayed the observations of travelers Haydar al-Uryan and Balaban, that Yakub's domains included about 700 settlements. He possessed 40,000 cavalry and was able to raise 200,000 troops in times of war, although historian Varlık considers this number exaggerated.

Yakub eventually conquered the regions of Simav and Kula, which were later regained by the Catalan Company. Similarly, Philadelphia (later known as Alaşehir), which he had earlier taken over, was lost to the Catalans in the spring of 1304, but the town started paying him jizya by 1314. Yakub had hostile relations with the Ottoman state, and provoked the Tatars of the Chavdar tribe near Karacahisar to attack them in 1313. After having eliminated the Hamidid and Eshrefid begs in 1325, Timurtash, the Ilkhanid governor of Anatolia, attempted to enact authority over the rulers of western Anatolia and seize the territory of Germiyan, Philadephila, Denizli, and Menteshe. Yakub's son-in-law, who was the lord of Afyonkarahisar, fled to Kütahya from Eretna, who was an officer under Timurtash tasked to capture the city. When Yakub was about to engage in a battle with Eretna, the latter was called back by Timurtash in 1327.

It was around that period, when the traveller and scholar Ibn Battuta remarked that he needed to be escorted by horsemen on his way to Denizli, because the surrounding plain was "infested by a troop of brigands called al-Jarmiyān", referring to the Germiyanids.

The region under Yakub was economically prosperous and saw an increase in literary and scientific patronage. Rumi's grandson Ulu Arif Chelebi visited the region by 1312 and maintained spiritual authority over Yakub.

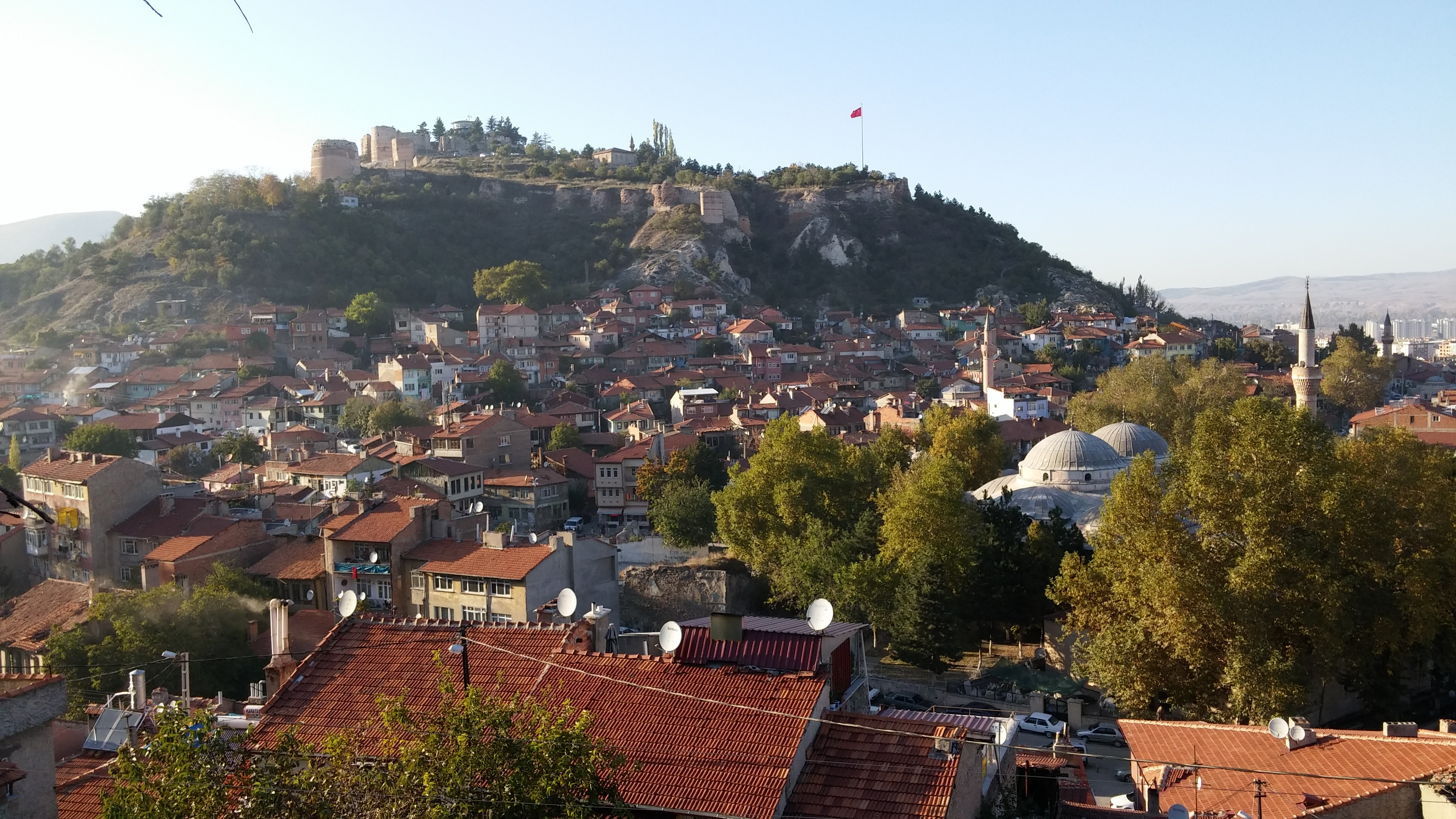
A view of Kütahya and its castle.

Yakub struck a single type of coin late into his reign. An unnamed coin minted in 1307 mentioning the title Khan-i Germiyan is identified with Yakub I. In the inscriptions of the castle of Sandıklı, which were later moved to a nearby fountain, he was referred to as Sultan al-Germiyaniyya Chelebi al-Azam (transl. Exalted Sultan of Germiyan). Yakub owned a waqf (charitable endowment) for the mevlevihane (congregational place for the Mevlevi Order) of Karahisar. According to İsmail Hakkı Uzunçarşılı, he possibly owned another waqf at the zawiya of the village of Hacim near Uşak, which dates to 1321. However, there the owner's father was recorded as Mehmed.

Yakub is known to have exchanged letters with the Mamluk Sultanate in 1340; these are the latest known records of his life, and his exact year of death is unknown. According to the 17th-century traveler Evliya Çelebi, who wrote three centuries after Yakub's death, he was buried at the hill of Hıdırlık near Kütahya.

=== Mehmed (c. 1340 – 1361) and Suleiman (1361–1387) ===
Mehmed, nicknamed Chakhshadan, retook Kula and Angir from the Catalan Company. Suleiman was the elder son of Mehmed Chakhshadan, the second Bey of Germiyan. He ascended to the throne upon the death of his father. Suleiman Shah's reign was initially peaceful. However, when Husam al-Din Ilyas of Hamid took refuge at his court from Ala al-Din of Karaman, Suleiman Shah assisted the Hamidids in recovering their lands lost to the Karamanids. This initiated a rivalry between Ala al-Din and Suleiman Shah.

Suleiman Shah sought new alliances as protection from the neighboring Karamanids and the ever-expanding Ottomans. He arranged a marriage between his daughter Devletşah Hatun and Murad I's son Bayezid. Murad I accepted the offer, hoping to expand the Ottoman influence over Anatolia. He sent the kadi of Bursa, Mehmed Efendi, emir-i alem Aksungur Agha, as well as their consorts, Chavushbashi Demirhan, and the nanny of Bayezid to Kütahya to formally request marriage with Suleiman's daughter. Suleiman Shah dispatched the Islamic scholar Ishak Fakih to the Ottoman capital, who returned with a gift from the Ottomans including the famous Germiyan atlas, Denizli clothes, silver, and gold. Moreover, Suleiman gave Kütahya, Simav, Eğrigöz, and Tavşanlı to the Ottomans as part of the dowry. Apart from these towns, many smaller settlements were annexed by a force of 2,000–3,000 Ottoman troops escorting the wedding convoy. The exact reason why he left the capital to the Ottomans is a matter of dispute. Ottoman chroniclers explained it through the rivalry between Karaman and Germiyan and the latter's preference for Ottoman protection. The wedding took place in 1381 in Kütahya, after which Bayezid became the governor of Kütahya, and Suleiman Shah had to retreat to Kula. Suleiman died in early 1387 before April and was buried in Gürhane Medrese.

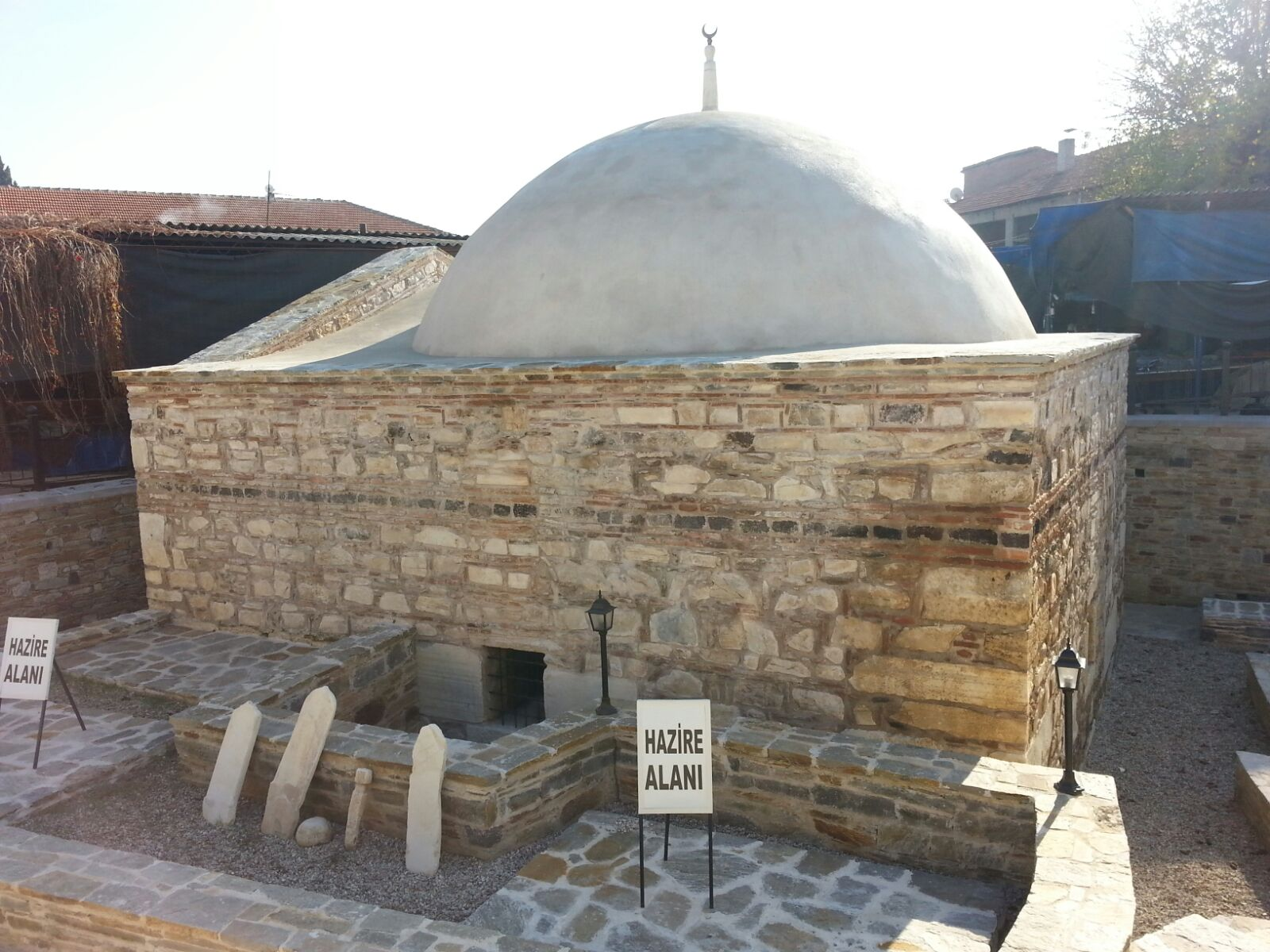
The tomb of Suleiman Shah in Kula.

=== Yakub II (1387–1429) ===
Yakub was the wali (governor) of Uşak and Şuhut during his father's reign. He inherited the throne when his father died in 1387 and maintained peace in the realm until 1390. He supported the Ottoman Sultanate at the Battle of Kosovo along with other local rulers. However, when the Ottoman Sultan Murad I died in battle and was succeeded by his son Bayezid I, Yakub, along with Kadi Burhan al-Din and other local rulers, sided with the Karamanids in a war against the Ottomans with the hopes that they could reclaim their land. While Karaman seized Beyşehir, Yakub started capturing some of the former possessions of Germiyan that his father had given to the Ottomans as part of Devletşah Hatun's dowry.

Intimidated by Bayezid's later seizure of much of Anatolia, Yakub attempted to return to good terms with him through various gifts but was nevertheless imprisoned and kept in the castle of Ipsala. In 1390, the entire realm of Germiyan came under Ottoman control, with Yakub no longer as its ruler. Sari Timurtash Pasha was appointed as the beylerbey (governor) of Anatolia Eyalet.

Yakub sought the protection of Timur (r. 1370–1405) in 1399, having escaped from prison and traveled to Syria in disguise through the Mediterranean Sea presumably the same year. He allied with Timur against the Ottomans with the guarantee that his rule would be restored, and fought for him at the Battle of Ankara in 1402. The former troops of Germiyan, Aydın, and Menteshe were initially under Bayezid's command, but switched sides when it became clear that their leaders had sided with Timur. Yakub recognized the sultan during the skirmish and had him captured. The Ottomans were ultimately defeated, and Timur restored the former Germiyan possessions to Yakub. Timur stayed in Kütahya for some time, subjecting the inhabitants to a one-time tax and confiscating the treasury of Sari Timurtash Pasha.

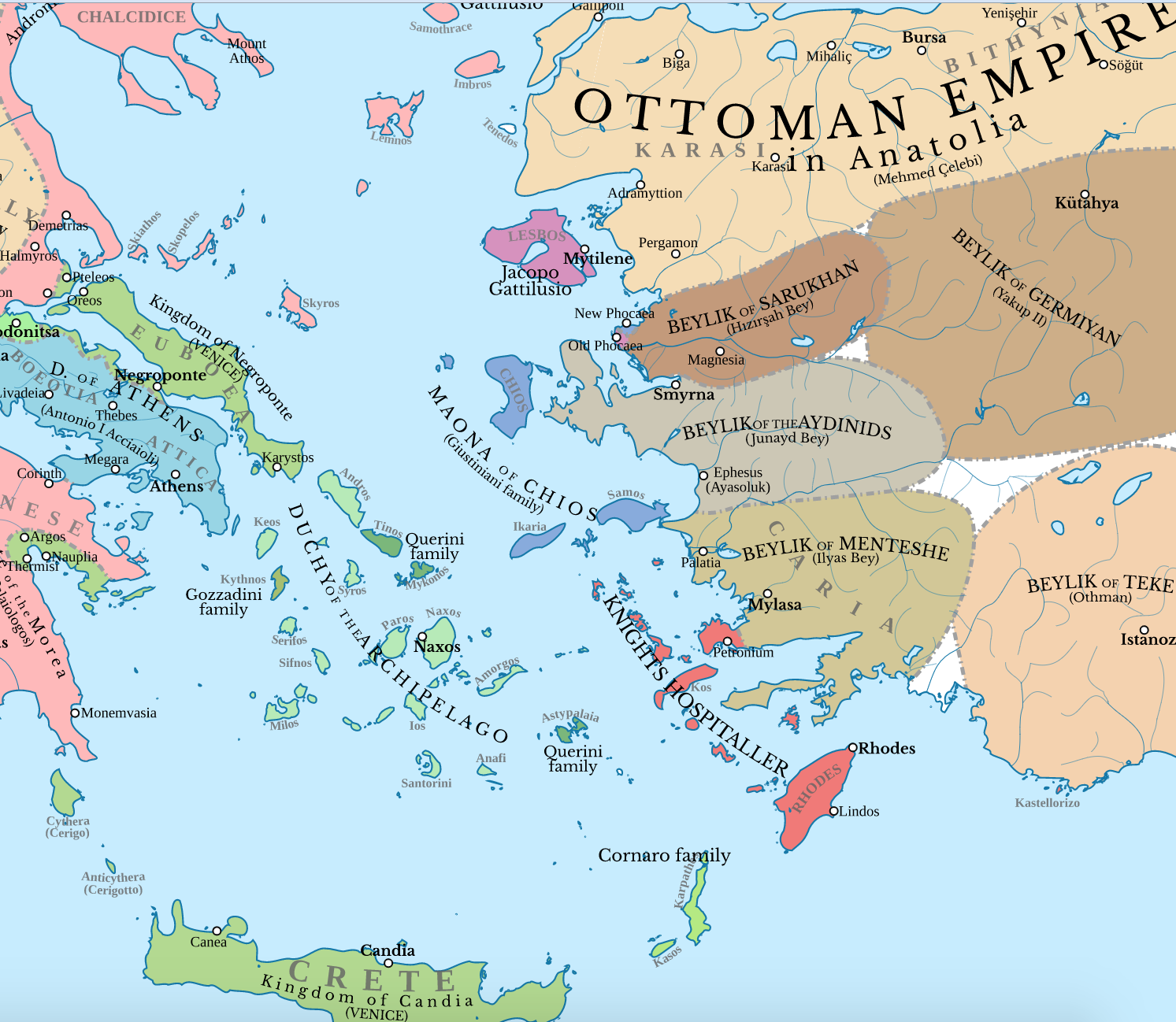
Germiyan, c. 1410

During the Ottoman Interregnum (1402–1413), Yakub allied himself with the future Ottoman sultan Mehmed Chelebi (r. 1413–21), one of the sons of Bayezid, against his brothers. As a result, Germiyan–Karaman relations gradually transitioned into hostility, as the latter's rivalry against the Ottomans ensued. This escalated to a war between the two in September 1410, and Kütahya fell to Mehmed II of Karaman (r. 1398–1399, 1402–1420) the next year, which effectively ended Yakub's second reign. Mehmed II further laid siege to Bursa for 31 days in 1413 and set the city on fire, which prompted Mehmed Chelebi to quickly return to Anatolia after having defeated his brother, Musa Chelebi, in Rumelia. When Musa's remains were brought to Bursa, signaling the defeat, Mehmed II of Karaman retreated in a hurry and left the territories he had taken from Germiyan. Mehmed Chelebi reinstated Yakub's rule in Germiyan in 1414. Yakub accommodated and supplied the Ottoman army during the following campaigns against Karaman. His rule until 1421 was largely free of threats.

When Mehmed Chelebi's son Murad II rose to the Ottoman throne, Yakub's relations with the Ottomans took a new turn. Murad's younger brother and governor of Hamid, Mustafa Chelebi was sponsored by Yakub, Karaman, and the Turghudlu tribe of Turkmens as a claimant to the Ottoman throne. Mustafa besieged and gained control of Iznik, and declared himself ruler, taking advantage of Murad's investment in the Siege of Constantinople (1422). However, the local Ottoman guardians did not allow Mustafa to depart from the city, on the orders of the sultan. Murad swiftly reclaimed control of the city and executed Mustafa. Yakub then reverted to friendly interactions with Murad. Even though Aydın and Menteshe were already under direct Ottoman control, Murad did not attempt to enact his sovereignty in Germiyan. By then, it had become subordinate to the Ottomans with their constant military involvement in the region. Likewise, Yakub bequeathed his domains to Murad, as he had no sons and did not want to hand over the rule to his sister's children, who were Murad II's half-uncles. In 1428, at an old age, he traveled to Bursa and paid respects to the graves of Osman I and Orhan. He was later welcomed by Murad in a lavish ceremony in Edirne and formally declared his will there. Sometime after returning to Germiyan, he fell sick, dying in January 1429. Murad annexed Germiyan as requested by Yakub, which brought its history to an end.

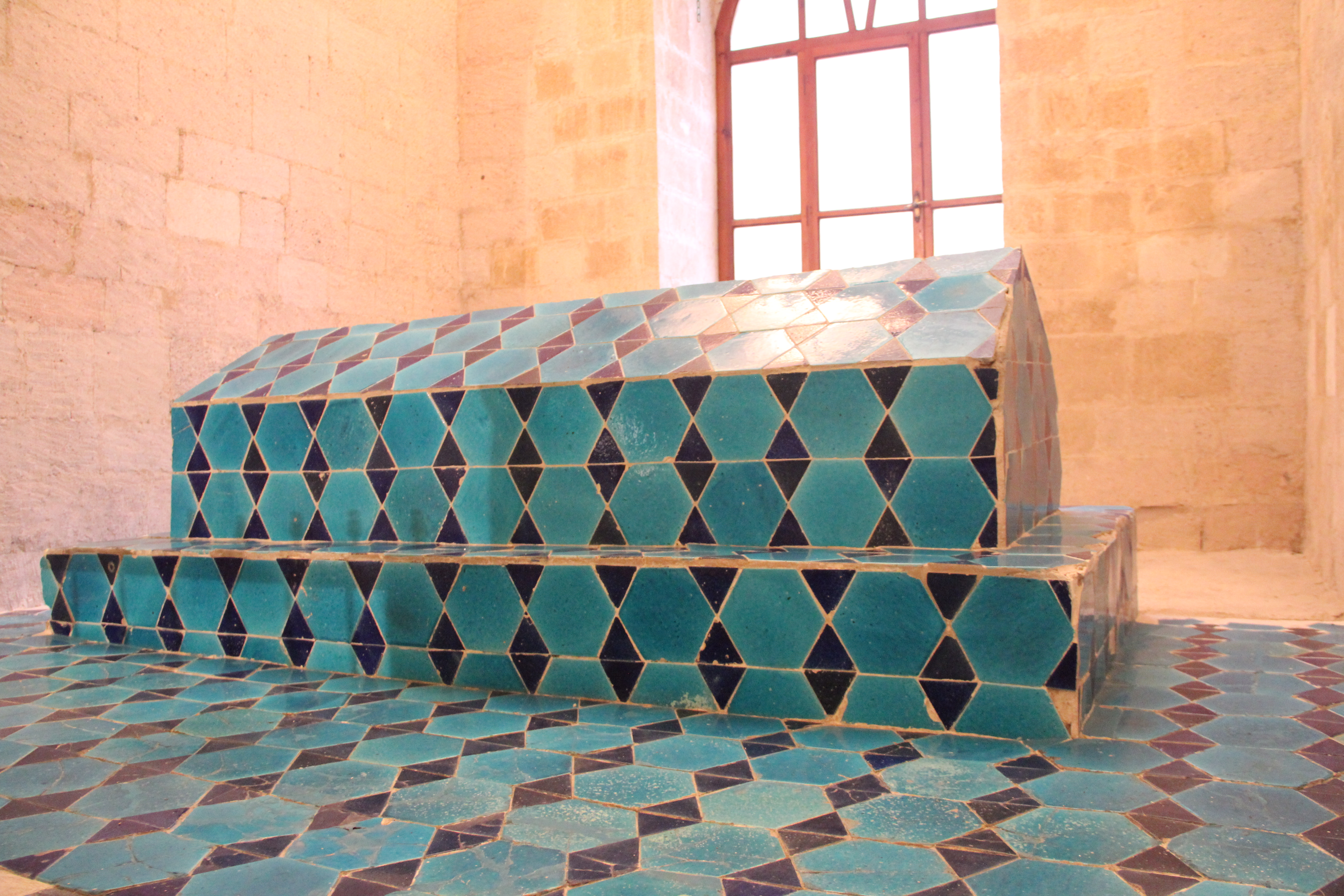
Yakub's grave in the Encaustic Tile Museum (Yakub Chelebi Külliye) in Kütahya.

== Culture ==
=== Architecture ===
Yakub's architectural legacy included the Yakub Chelebi Külliye (building complex) in Kütahya. It was built in 1411–12 and is composed of an imaret, masjid, türbe (tomb), madrasa (school), and library. After five months of operation, the Karamanid occupation forced the imaret to close for two and a half years. In 1414, when the region was regained by the Ottoman Sultan Mehmed I on behalf of Yakub, the building returned to use, and inscriptions (vakfiye), 2 by 3.70 meters in size, were added to the building, detailing its history. The inscriptions indicate that the imaret was owned by Mehmed I. It was later destroyed and the building was restored in accordance with its original form by its waqf (endowment) trustee Ishak Fakih bin Halil in 1440–41. In 1803, the Ottoman governor of Anatolia, Gurju Osman Pasha, commissioned its reparation and merged the imaret and the masjid. The tomb includes the sarcophagi of Yakub II and his wife Pasha Kerime Hatun, which are ornamented with encaustic tiles. The building was restored again in 1999 and reopened as the Encaustic Tile Museum.

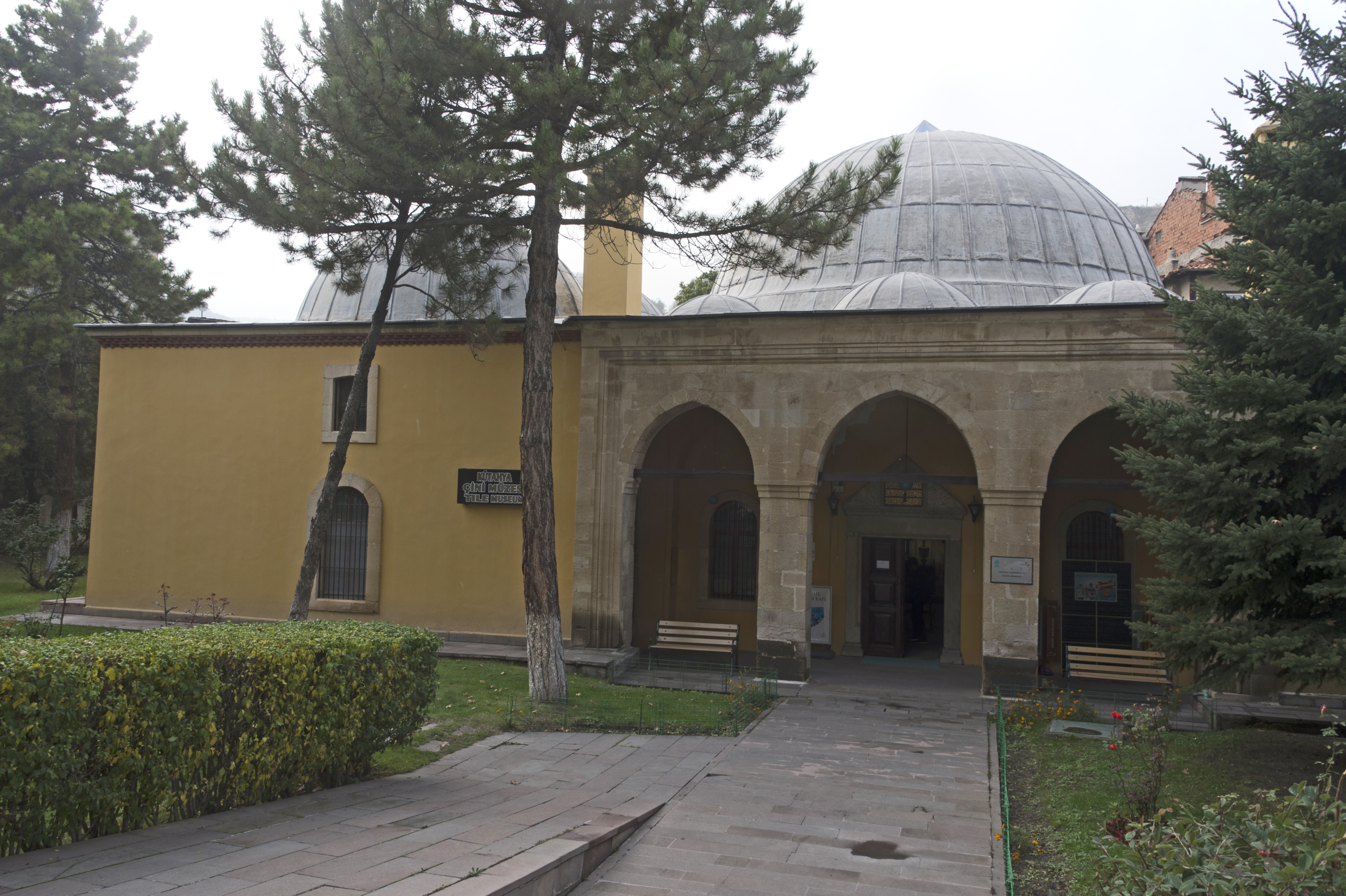
Exterior of the former Yakub Chelebi Külliye.

=== Literature ===
Suleiman Shah was described as a generous ruler, and many literary works were produced under him. Suleiman had Shaykh-oghlu Mustafa, who was the nishanji and defterdar (treasurer) at his court, translate several Persian works to Turkish, including Ḳābūs-name (kept by the Egyptian National Library and Archives) and Marzbān-nāme. Shaykh-oghlu also authored a prose, Kanz al-kubarāʾ, and a verse romance, Khurshīdnāme, dedicated to Suleiman Shah. Manuscripts of these works are kept in Istanbul, London, and Paris. The poet Ahmedi first devoted his Iskendername to Suleiman Shah but after his death, added a part about the Ottomans and Bayezid I's son Suleiman Chelebi, finalizing the work in February 1390.

The Germiyanid palace became a center of science and literature during Yakub II's reign. Poet Sheikhi Sinan was known as a musahib (compatriot) of Yakub. The Persian work Tabirname was translated into Turkish by Ahmed-i Dai on the orders of Yakub II.

== Bibliography ==
- Bilecik, Gülberk (2013). "Yâkub Çelebi Külliyesi". TDV Encyclopedia of Islam, Vol. 43 (Vekâlet – Yûsî) (in Turkish). Istanbul: Presidency of Religious Affairs, Centre for Islamic Studies. pp. 279–280. ISBN 978-975-389-754-9.
- Bruinessen, Martin van (1992). Agha, Shaikh and State: The Social and Political Structures of Kurdistan. Bloomsbury Academic. p. 161. ISBN 978-1-85649-018-4.
- Buluç, Sadettin (1969). "Eski Anadolu Türkçesiyle Bir Kabus-name Çevirisi" [A Translation of Kabus-anme in Old Anatolian Turkish]. Belleten (in Turkish). 7. Turkish Language Association: 195–200. ISSN 2651-5113.
- Flemming, Barbara (1964). "Landschaftsgeschichte von Pamphylien, Pisidien und Lykien im Spätmittelalter". Abhandlungen für die Kunde des Morgenlandes. XXXV (1).
- Foss, Clive (2022). The Beginnings of the Ottoman Empire. Oxford Studies in Byzantium. Oxford University Press. ISBN 9780198865438.
- Holt, Peter Malcolm (1986). The Age of the Crusades: the Near East from the eleventh century to 1517. Longman. ISBN 9780582493032.
- Kafadar, Cemal (2007). "A Rome of One's Own: Reflections on Cultural Geography and Identity in the Lands of Rum". Muqarnas. 24. Brill: 7–25. doi:10.1163/22118993-90000108.
- Köprülü, Mehmet Fuat (1992). The Origins of the Ottoman Empire. Translated by Gary Leiser. State University of New York Press. ISBN 0-7914-0819-1.
- Magoulias, Harry J. (1975). Decline and fall of Byzantium to the Ottoman Turks. Wayne State University Press. ISBN 9780783736112.
- Masters, Bruce Alan; Ágoston, Gábor (2010). Encyclopedia of the Ottoman Empire. Infobase. ISBN 9781438110257. OCLC 227205977.
- Mélikoff, I. (1965). "Germiyān-Og̲h̲ullari̊̊". In Lewis, B.; Pellat, Ch. & Schacht, J. (eds.). The Encyclopaedia of Islam, Second Edition. Volume II: C–G. Leiden: E. J. Brill. OCLC 495469475.
- Peacock, Andrew Christian Spencer (2000). "Saljuqs iii. Saljuqs of Rum". In Yarshater, Ehsan (ed.). Encyclopædia Iranica (Online ed.). Encyclopædia Iranica Foundation.
- Petry, Carl F. (1998). The Cambridge History of Egypt. Cambridge University Press. ISBN 9780521633130.
- Philippides, Marios (1990). Biblioteca apostolica vaticana – 1990, Byzantium, Europe, and the early Ottoman sultans, 1373-1513: an anonymous Greek chronicle of the seventeenth century. A. D. Caratzas. ISBN 9780892414307.
- Thurin, Romain (2024). "The secret history of Germiyan, or a reassessment of the debates on the origins of the Germiyanids". Bulletin of the School of Oriental and African Studies. 87: 229–248. doi:10.1017/S0041977X24000223. ISSN 1474-0699.
- Uzunçarşılı, İsmail Hakkı (1969). Anadolu Beylikleri Ve Akkoyunlu, Karakoyunlu Devletleri [Anatolian Beyliks and Aq Qoyunlu, Qara Qoyunlu States] (in Turkish). Turkish Historical Society Press. ISBN 9751624576. OCLC 563553149.
- Varlık, Mustafa Çetin (1974). Germiyan-oğulları tarihi (1300-1429) (in Turkish). Ankara: Atatürk University Press. OCLC 6807984.
- Varlık, Mustafa Çetin (1996). "Germiyanoğulları". TDV Encyclopedia of Islam, Vol. 14 (Geli̇bolu – Haddesenâ) (in Turkish). Istanbul: Presidency of Religious Affairs, Centre for Islamic Studies. pp. 33–35. ISBN 978-975-389-441-8.
- Varlık, Mustafa Çetin (2013). "Yâkub Bey". TDV Encyclopedia of Islam, Vol. 43 (Vekâlet – Yûsî) (in Turkish). Istanbul: Presidency of Religious Affairs, Centre for Islamic Studies. pp. 278–279. ISBN 978-975-389-754-9.
