= Haji Bektash Veli =

Islamic scholar and mystic (1209–1271)

Haji Bektash Wali
- بکتاش
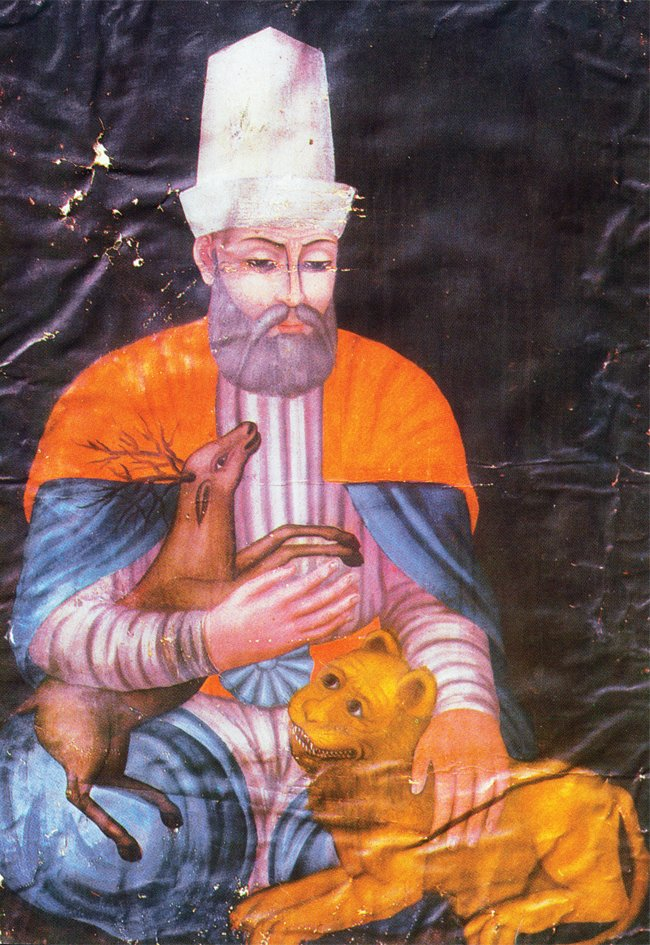
- 15th century painting depicting Haji Bektash, located in Hajibektash complex

Personal life
- Born: c. 1209 Fushenjan, Nishapur, Khwarazmian Empire
- Died: c. 1271 Sulucakarahöyük, Sultanate of Rum
- Resting place: Haji Bektash Veli Complex, Nevşehir Province, Turkey; 38°56′N 34°33′E
- Era: Medieval
- Known for: Sufi mysticism

Religious life
- Religion: Islam

Muslim leader
- Period in office: 13th century
- Influenced by: Ahmad Yasawi, Baba Ishak
- Influenced: Imadaddin Nasimi, Yunus Emre, Pir Sultan Abdal, Sarı Saltık

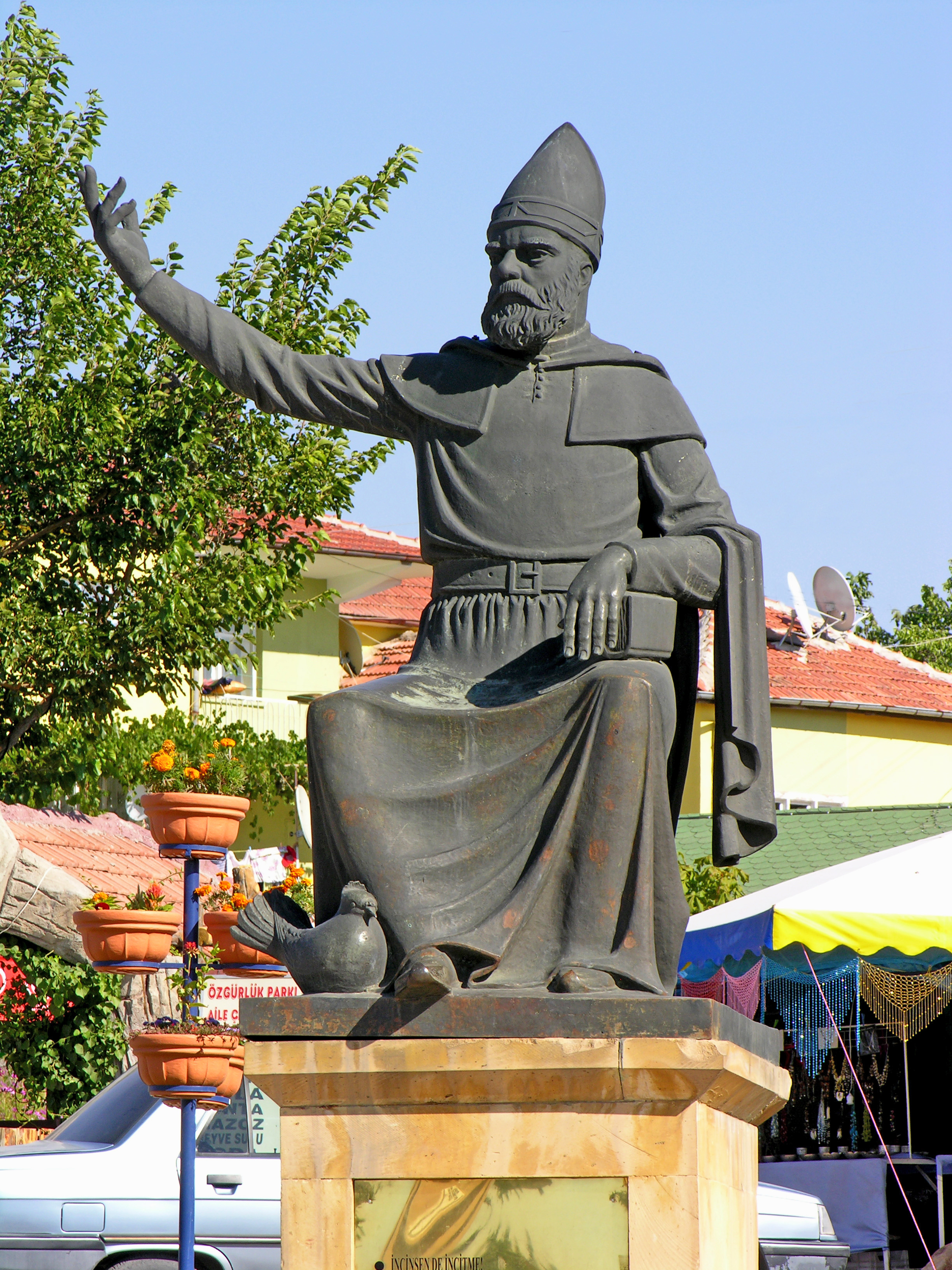
Sculpture of Haji Bektash Veli in Turkey

Haji Bektash Veli (Persian: حاجی بکتاش ولی, romanized: Ḥājī Baktāš Valī; Turkish: Hacı Bektaş Veli; Albanian: Haxhi Veli Bektashi; c. 1209–1271) was an Islamic scholar, mystic, saint and philosopher from Khorasan who lived and taught in Anatolia. His original name was Muhammad. He is also referred to as the "Sultan of Hearts" and the "Dervish of the Dervishes".

He is revered among Alevis for an Islamic understanding that is esoteric, rational and humanistic. He was one of the many figures who flourished in the Sultanate of Rum and had an important influence on the culture of Turkic nomads of Asia Minor.

== Identity ==
Bektash is generally believed to be of Persian or Turkic origin, and his name is considered to be of Turkic origin. Bektash belonged to a group of Khorasani migrants in Anatolia who had left their homeland during the Mongol conquests. According to the Vilâyet-Nâme, Bektash was the son of Sayyed Muhammad ibn Musa, a great-grandson of Musa al-Kazim; this is impossible, given the fact that Bektash lived in the 7th/13th century. Genealogies encountered in later sources and designed to fill the obvious gap in time are all questionable and may well have been inspired by a attain religious legitimacy within the masses.

According to "The history of Aşıkpaşazade" (Aşıkpaşazade Tarihi), written by one of the grandsons of "Aşık Pasha" who was the son of "Muhlis Paşa" (Muhlees Pāshā) who was the son of renowned Baba Ilyas al-Khorasani, "Sayyeed Muhammad ibn Sayyeed Ebrāheem Ātā" had come to Sivas, Anatolia from Khorasan with his brother "Menteş" (Mantash) to become affiliated with the tariqat of Baba Ilyas al-Khorasani. On the other hand, the famous reference book of Bektaşi order, Valāyat-Nāma-i Hādjī Baktāsh-ī Wālī, claims that "Bektash" was the murshid of Bābā (Bābā Eliyās al-Khorāsānī).

The name attributed to him by his followers can be translated as "The Pilgrim Saint Bektash." The Haji title implies that he had made the pilgrimage to Mecca and Medina to perform Hajj. He is the eponym of the Bektashi Sufi order and is considered one of the principal teachers of Alevism. According to the Encyclopaedia of Islam, the "center and source of his teachings" was ʿAlī ibn Abī Ṭālib, whom Alevis believe to be the righteous successor of Muhammad while also "acknowledging the twelve Shia Imams" and "holding Jafar as-Sadiq in high esteem". Despite his Shia belief and his unorthodox teachings, he is considered a renowned figure in the history and culture of both the Ottoman Empire and the modern nation-state of Turkey. On the other hand, Ibn Khallikan reports that Shī'ite tendencies belonged not to him but rather to his murids, who took refuge in his tekke at Suluca Kara Oyuk in Kırşehir after the Babai Revolt.

=== Origins ===
Born in Nishapur. Legends state that Bektash was a khalifa of Ahmad Yasawi, the eponymous founder of the Yasawi order that had a wide following among Turkic nomads in Central Asia. Though chronogically impossible, supposedly Yasawi sent him to Anatolia to propagate his order there. Not much is known about him, his origins are shrouded in mystery and much of his biography is based on legends.

==== Silsila connecting to Hoja Ahmad Yasawi ====
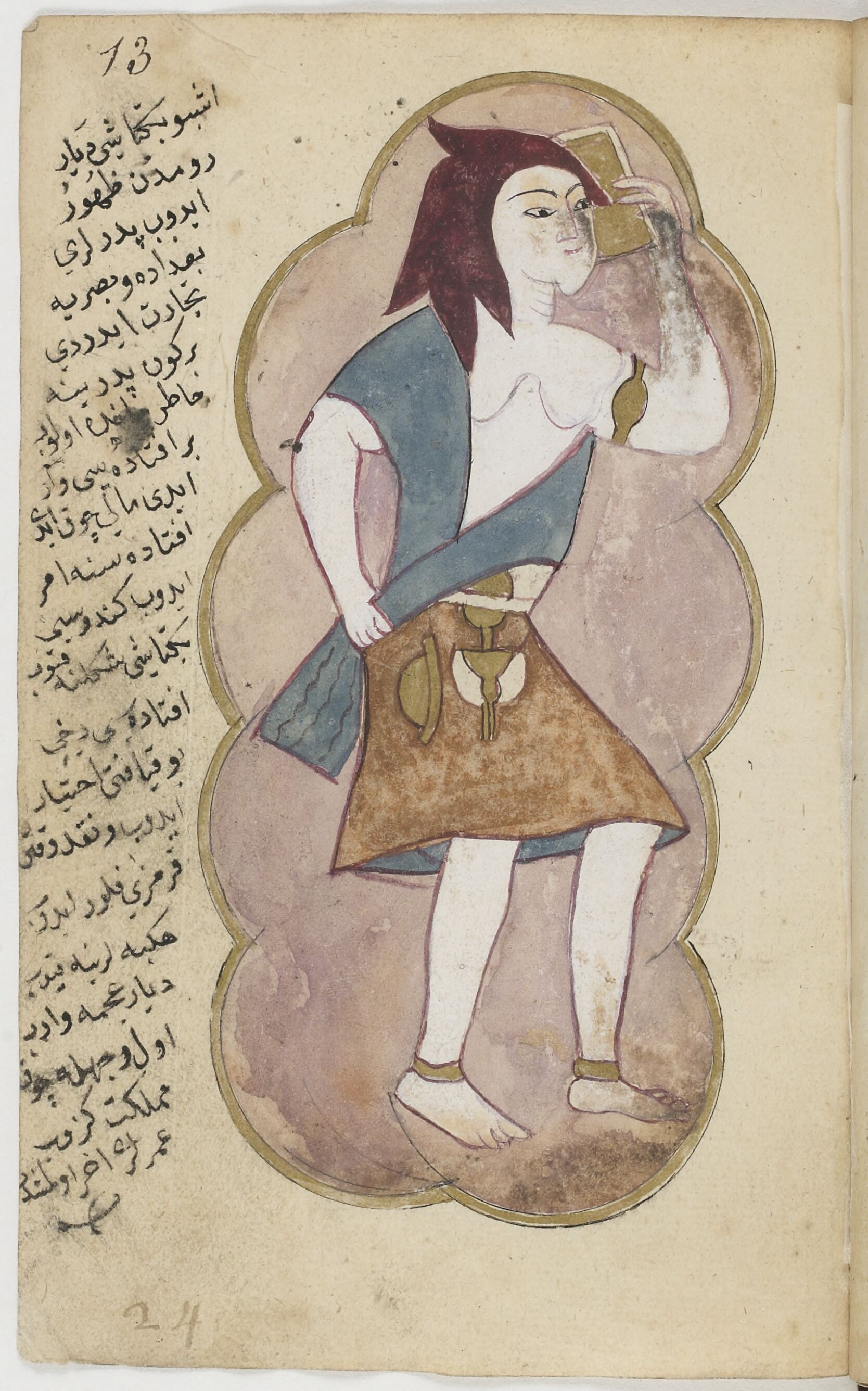
Haji Baktash Veli, a murid of the Malāmatī-Qalāndārī Sheikh Qutb ad-Dīn Haydar, introduced Ahmad Yasawi's doctrine of "Four Doors and Forty Standing" into his order.

The sisilah of Hadji Baktāsh Wālī reaches to the Yasawi Order through another but a similar tariqah, which is well known as the Wafā'īyyah Order of Abu’l Wafā al-Khwarazmī, who was a murid of Ahmad Yasawi and the murshid of Dede Ğarkhen, who was in turn the murshid of Bābā Eliyās al-Khorāsānī († 1240), an influential mystic from Eastern Persia. Modern research connects him to another important religious movement of that time: to the Qalandariyya and to Bābā Eliyās al-Khorāsānī, who was the murshid of Aybak Bābā, who was in turn the murshid of one of the leading actors of the Babai revolt, Baba Ishak, as well. Eventually, Bābā Eliyās Khorāsānī was held responsible for the Babai revolt organized by Baba Ishak, and consequently executed by Mubāriz’ud-Dīn-i Armāğān-Shāh, the supreme commander-in-chief of the armies of the Sultanate of Rum. Bektash himself was a discipline of Baba Ishak and was connected to the Turkoman rebel movement, which weakened the state of Rum prior to the Mongol invasions.

The original Bektashi teachings in many ways resemble the teachings of the Khorasanian Qalandariyya and that of Bābā Eliyās. Haji Baktash Veli was the murid of Lokhmānn Bābā (Lokhmānn Sarakhsī), who was one of the four most famous murids of Bābā Eliyās al-Khorāsānī as well. Lokhmānn Bābā, on the other hand, was also a murid of the renowned Qalandari Qutb ad-Dīn Haydar, who was the murid of Ahmad Yasawi. For these reasons, his silsila gets connected to Ahmad Yasawi through two different channels, one by means of the Wafā’i and the other through Qutb ad-Dīn Haydar. He was highly respected by the Sultanate of Rum due to his amicable attitude during the Babai revolt, and his khanqah in Suluca Kara Oyuk was permitted to remain open during and after it, thereby saving most of the lives of the Alevi survivors.

==== From the Vilayetname ====
From the Vilayetname (or: The Saintly Exploits of Hacı Bektaş Veli):

After Lokman Perende had returned from the hajj, the erenler (saints) of Khorasan came to offer him their respects. When they saw a spring flowing from the middle of the mekteb, they said, "We have been here before many times and had never seen such spring." Lokman Perende replied, "This is by the blessings of Hunkar Haji Bektash." The erenler asked, "Who is this Hunkar Haji Bektash?" Lokman Perende said, "Haji Bektash Hunkar is this beloved one," and he then pointed to the young Bektash. The erenler said, "That one is still a child. How on earth could he become a haji?" Lokman Perende then described to the gathering all of the miracles of Haji Bektash one by one and then said, "While I was performing my prayer at the Kaabah, Bektash was always there praying next to me. When we completed our prayer, he would vanished." The erenler said, "Where could this boy have found this extraordinary capability?" Then Hunkar Haji Bektash opened his blessed mouth and said, "I am the secret of the exalted Imam Ali, who is the dispenser of the River Kawthar and who is the Lion of Allah, the Emperor of Sainthood and the Commander of the Faithful. My origin and family line is from him. These many miracles are my inheritance which is granted by Allah. It should not be surprising to anyone that miracles like these appear from me, for this is the Power of God."

The erenler of Khorasan said, "If, in reality, you are the secret of the Shah, he has marks. Show these marks to us and we shall believe." Now the sign of Hazreti Ali was this; in the middle of his blessed hand he had a beautiful mole of emerald tone. So Hazreti Hunkar Haji Bektash Veli opened his sanctified hand and showed his palm. They all saw that there, in the middle his palm, was a beautiful emerald mole. The erenler said, "The Commander of the Faithful also had a beautiful emerald mole on his blessed forehead." Hunkar Haji Bektash Veli removed the skull cap from his blessed head and all saw a divinely illuminated mole of emerald tint between his brow. All of the erenler begged for forgiveness, saying, "O Dervish of the Dervishes, we have been sorely mistaken." They surrendered to him asserting, "These are indeed miracles."

==== The Four Poles of Anatolia ====
Haji Bektash Veli is considered one of the four poles (aqtab) of Anatolia by all tariqa circles, the others being Mawlana Rumi, Shaban-i Veli, and Haji Bayram-i Veli.

== Spread of the Bektashi order ==
Bektash, although successful in attracting numerous followers, most likely did not establish the Bektashi order himsel, but by the 14th century the brotherhood had a formal existence. The order went through two drastic changes: the came in the early 15th century due to heavy Hurufi influence, and the second came in the early 16th century, due to the teachings of Balim Sultan, who became the order's second founder, introducing new practices like celibacy.

Bektashism spread from Anatolia through the Ottoman Turks primarily into the Balkans, where its leaders (known as dedes or babas) helped convert many to Islam. The Bektashi Sufi order became the official order of the elite Janissary corps after their establishment. The Bektashi Order remained very popular among Albanians, and Bektashi tekkes can be found throughout Albania, Kosovo and the Republic of Macedonia to this day. During the Ottoman period Bektashi tekkes were set up in Egypt and Iraq, but the order did not take root in these countries. There is also a Bektashi tekke in Michigan, founded by Baba Rexheb, who was a Bektashi baba and a writer in Islamic mysticism and Bektashism.

=== Nineteenth century and later ===
When the Janissary corps were abolished in 1826 by Mahmud II the Bektashis suffered the same fate. The babas of the tekkes and their dervishes were banished to staunchly Sunni villages and towns, and their tekkes were closed or handed over to Sunni Sufi orders (mostly Naqshbandi; for example, the Goztepe Tekke in Istanbul was given to the Naqshbandis during this period).

Although the Bektashi order regained many of its lost tekkes during the Tanzimat period, they, along with all other Sufi orders, were banned in Turkey in 1925 as a result of the country's secularization policies and all Bektashi tekkes were closed once more along with all others.

The main Bektashi tekke is in the town of Hacıbektaş in Central Anatolia, known as Hajibektash complex. It is currently open as a museum and his resting place is still visited by both Sunni and Alevi Muslims. Large festivals are held there every August. Also the Göztepe and Shahkulu tekkes in Istanbul are now used as meeting places for Alevis. The biggest Bektashi tekke is said to be in Albania. There is also a Bektashi tekke in Taylor, Michigan, US, founded by Baba Rexheb, who was a famous Bektashi writer on Islamic mysticism and Bektashism.

== In popular culture ==
- In the Turkish TV series Yunus Emre: Aşkın Yolculuğu (2015), he was portrayed by Ahmet Mekin.

== See also ==
- Al-Hallaj
- Rumi

== Sources ==
- Algar, Hamid (1989). "BEKTĀŠ, ḤĀJĪ". Encyclopædia Iranica. Vol. IV, Fasc. 2. pp. 116–118.
- Bashir, Shahzad (2008). Olson, Carl (ed.). Celibacy and Religious Traditions. Oxford University Press. ISBN 978-0-19-530632-3.
- J. Birge, The Bektashi Order of Dervishes, London, 1937, chapter VI. (p. 22)
- Sayyed Hossein Nasr, Sufi Essays, SUNY Press, (1972). p. 117.
- Brian Glyn Williams: Mystics, Nomads and Heretics: A History of the Diffusion of Muslim Syncretism from Central Asia to the Thirteenth-Century Turco-Byzantine Dobruca - International journal of Turkish studies, 2001 - University of Wisconsin (p. 7)
- R. Khanam, Encyclopaedic ethnography of Middle-East and Central Asia, Global Vision Publishing Ho, 2005 (p. 142)
- The Harvard Theological Review, Cambridge University Press, Vol. 2, No. 3, July 1909, (p. 343)
- Richard Robert Madden, The Turkish Empire: In its relations with Christianity and civilization., Vol.1, 335.
- Indries Shah, The Way of the Sufi, 294.
- Mark Soileau, Humanist Mystics:Nationalism and the commemoration of saints in Turkey, 375.
- Olsson, Tord; Ozdalga, Elisabeth; Raudvere, Catharina (1998). Alevi Identity: Cultural, Religious and Social Perspectives. Taylor & Francis. ISBN 9780203985878.
