= Suleiman of Germiyan =

Bey of Germiyan from 1361 to 1387

Suleiman Shah
- Sultanu'l-A'zam el-Ādil
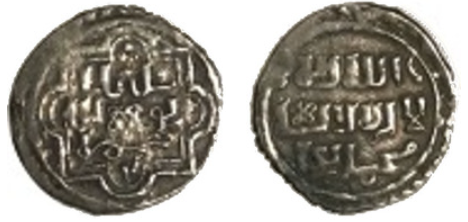
- Akçe of Suleiman Shah

Bey of Germiyan
- Reign: 1361–1387
- Predecessor: Mehmed Chakhshadan
- Successor: Yakub II
- Died: 1387; Kula, Germiyan
- Burial: Gürhane Medrese, Kula
- Consort: Daughter of Umur of Aydın; Mutahhare Abide Hatun
- Issue: Yakub II; Hizir Pasha; Burhan al-Din Ilyas Pasha; Qurd Abdal; Devletşah Hatun
- House: Germiyan
- Father: Meḥmed Chakhshādan
- Religion: Islam

Suleiman Shah (Old Anatolian Turkish: سليمان شاه; died 1387), also known as Shah Chelebi, was Bey of Germiyan in western Anatolia from 1361 until his death. His reign was initially peaceful, but he was eventually involved in a conflict with the Karamanids, which forced him to seek an alliance with the Ottoman state. He arranged the marriage of his daughter Devletşah Hatun and Murad I's son and future successor, Bayezid. Although he secured an alliance with the Ottomans, Germiyan lost considerable land as Suleiman left numerous towns and smaller settlements for them to seize, including the capital Kütahya, as part of the dowry payment. Suleiman relocated to Kula and died there in 1387.

== Background ==
Germiyan first appeared around Malatya in 1239 under Kaykhusraw II's rule of the Sultanate of Rum tasked to subdue Baba Ishak, and in 1277, they were involved in the fight against Jimri and Mehmed of Karaman in western Anatolia. Yakub I was the first Bey to rule the state of Germiyan. Although he initially accepted vassalage under Kayqubad III, the Sultanate of Rum disintegrated shortly after. Yakub was the suzerain of many of his neighbors, and his reign was described as economically prosperous. He was succeeded by his son Mehmed, nicknamed Chakhshadan, details about whose rule are largely unknown.

== Life ==
Suleiman was the elder son of Mehmed Chakhshadan, the second Bey of Germiyan. He ascended to the throne upon the death of his father. Suleiman Shah's reign was initially peaceful. However, when Husam al-Din Ilyas of Hamid took refuge at his court from Ala al-Din of Karaman, Suleiman Shah assisted the Hamidids in recovering their lands lost to the Karamanids. This initiated a rivalry between Ala al-Din and Suleiman Shah.

Suleiman Shah sought new alliances as protection from the neighboring Karamanids and the ever-expanding Ottomans. He arranged a marriage between his daughter Devletşah Hatun and Murad I's son Bayezid. Murad I accepted the offer, hoping to expand the Ottoman influence over Anatolia. He sent the kadi of Bursa, Mehmed Efendi, emir-i alem Aksungur Agha, as well as their consorts, Chavushbashi Demirhan, and the nanny of Bayezid to Kütahya to formally request marriage with Suleiman's daughter. Suleiman Shah dispatched the Islamic scholar Ishak Fakih to the Ottoman capital, who returned with a gift from the Ottomans including the famous Germiyan atlas, Denizli clothes, silver, and gold. Moreover, Suleiman gave Kütahya, Simav, Eğrigöz, and Tavşanlı to the Ottomans as part of the dowry. Apart from these towns, many smaller settlements were annexed by a force of 2,000–3,000 Ottoman troops escorting the wedding convoy. (Note: These settlements were: In the nahiyah of Kütahya: Kızılca-viran, Seydi-köy, Eriklü, Şeyh-ömer, İne-gâzi, Elma-ağacı, Kara-ağaç, Süle-oğlu, Timürcü-viran, Hoca-oğlu, Çomar ve çöplü; Yoncalı: Kara-ağaç, Uç-ağacı, Sele-oğlu; Sazanos: Hisar çavdar, Ağar; Tavşanlı: Çukur-viran; Altıntaş: Virancık, Çakır-sazı, Sevdiğin; Simav: Yenice, Kara-abdal; Kula: Akça-in, Balçıklu; Aslan-apa: Kulaksuz, and Güğüm.) The exact reason why he left the capital to the Ottomans is a matter of dispute. Ottoman chroniclers explained it through the rivalry between Karaman and Germiyan and the latter's preference for Ottoman protection. The wedding took place in 1381 in Kütahya, after which Bayezid became the governor of Kütahya, and Suleiman Shah had to retreat to Kula. Suleiman died in early 1387 before April and was buried in Gürhane Medrese.

Suleiman Shah was described as a generous ruler, and many literary works were produced under him. Suleiman had Shaykh-oghlu Mustafa, who was the nishandji, defterdar, and treasurer at Suleiman's court, translate several Persian works into Turkish, Ḳābūs-name and Marzbān-nāme. Shaykh-oghlu has also authored a prose, Kanz al-kubarāʾ, and a verse romance, Khurshīdnāme, dedicated to Suleiman Shah. Manuscripts of these works are kept in Istanbul, London, and Paris. The poet Ahmedi first devoted his Iskendername to Suleiman Shah but after his death, added a part about the Ottomans and Bayezid I's son Süleyman Çelebi, finalizing the work in February 1390.

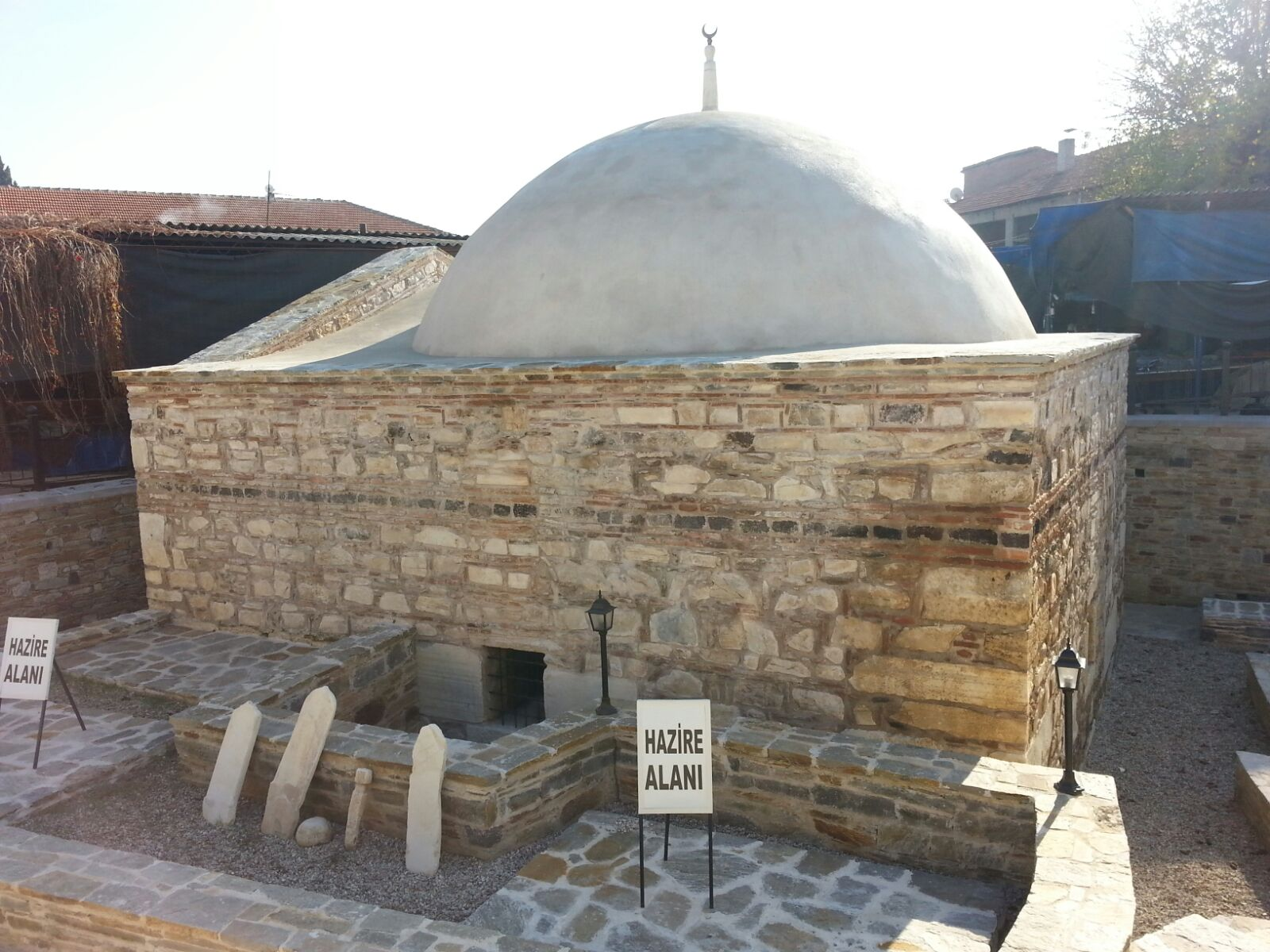
The tomb of Suleiman Shah in Kula.

== Family ==
Suleiman Shah had two known consorts: a daughter of Umur of Aydın; and Mutahhare Abide Hatun, who was the daughter of Sultan Walad, son of the famous Sufi scholar and poet Rumi. Suleiman's offspring included Hizir Pasha, Burhan al-Din Ilyas Pasha, Qurd Abdal, (Note: Qurd Abdal (Old Anatolian Turkish: قورد ابدال) was mentioned in an inscription from 1369 located in Seyyid Battal Gazi Complex in Seyitgazi, Eskişehir. The inscription was discovered in 2015, and the name was not attested by older sources.) and Devletşah Hatun, all born to Mutahhare Abide Hatun; and his successor Yakub II, born to the daughter of Umur. Apart from Devletşah Hatun, Suleiman had numerous other daughters.

== Bibliography ==
- Mélikoff, I. (1965). "Germiyān-Og̲h̲ullari̊̊". In Lewis, B.; Pellat, Ch. & Schacht, J. (eds.). The Encyclopaedia of Islam, Second Edition. Volume II: C–G. Leiden: E. J. Brill. OCLC 495469475.
- Turgut, Vedat (2017). "Germiyanoğulları'nın Menşei, Vakıfları ve Batı Anadolu'nun Türkleşmesi Meselesi Üzerine". The Journal of Social and Cultural Studies (in Turkish). III (5): 1–98.
- Tütüncü, Mehmet (May 2015). "Seyitgazi Kurd Abdal Vakfiyesi - 1369 Yılı". Tarih ve Düşünce Dergisi (in Turkish): 16–23.
- Uzunçarşılı, İsmail Hakkı (1969). Anadolu Beylikleri Ve Akkoyunlu, Karakoyunlu Devletleri [Anatolian Beyliks and Aq Qoyunlu, Qara Qoyunlu States] (in Turkish). Turkish Historical Society Press. ISBN 9751624576. OCLC 563553149.
- Varlık, Mustafa Çetin (1974). Germiyan-oğulları tarihi (1300-1429) (in Turkish). Ankara: Atatürk University Press. OCLC 6807984.
- Varlık, Mustafa Çetin (1996). "Germiyanoğulları". TDV Encyclopedia of Islam, Vol. 14 (Geli̇bolu – Haddesenâ) (in Turkish). Istanbul: Presidency of Religious Affairs, Centre for Islamic Studies. pp. 33–35. ISBN 978-975-389-441-8.
