= Yakub II =

Bey of Germiyan between 1387–90, 1402–11, and 1414–29

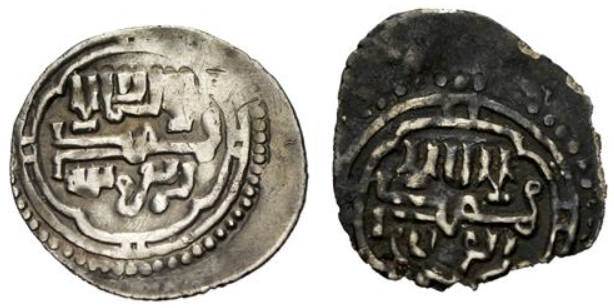
- Coin minted by Yakub II during his first reign.

Bey of Germiyan
- First reign: 1387–1390
- Predecessor: Suleiman Shah
- Successor: Occupation by Bayezid I of the Ottoman Sultanate
- Second reign: 1402–1411
- Predecessor: Sari Timurtash Pasha (Ottoman beylerbey of Anatolia)
- Successor: Occupation by Mehmed II of Karaman
- Third reign: 1414–1429
- Predecessor: Occupation by Mehmed II of Karaman
- Successor: Bequest to Murad II
- Died: January 1429; Kütahya, Germiyan
- Spouse: Pasha Kerime Hatun
- Dynasty: Germiyan
- Father: Suleiman Shah
- Mother: Daughter of Umur of Aydın
- Religion: Islam

Yakub II (died January 1429), also known as Yakub Chelebi, was Bey of Germiyan in western Anatolia from 1387 to 1390, 1402 to 1411, and 1414 until his death. Yakub was the patron of several literary and architectural works produced during his reign.

He was initially on friendly terms with the Ottomans, but turned against Sultan Bayezid I (r. 1389–1402) and attempted to reclaim considerable territory, including the former capital Kütahya. He was jailed by Bayezid in 1390, and Germiyan wholly came under Ottoman control. Nine years later, Yakub escaped from prison and sought the protection of Timur (r. 1370–1405), who, after crushing Bayezid with the help of Yakub at the Battle of Ankara in 1402, restored Germiyan's former boundaries. In 1411, Kütahya fell to Mehmed II of Karaman (r. 1398–1399, 1402–1420), interrupting Yakub's reign a second time. His rule was reinstated by the Ottoman sultan, Mehmed I (r. 1413–1421), upon the defeat of the Karamanids. Although Yakub initially supported Mustafa Chelebi as a claimant to the Ottoman throne, Mustafa's defeat forced Yakub to have amicable relations with Sultan Murad II (r. 1421–1444, 1446–1451). Yakub did not have any male heirs and left the rule to Murad II in his will shortly before he died in 1429.

== Background ==
The Germiyans first appeared around Malatya in 1239, under Kaykhusraw II's rule (r. 1237–1246) of the Sultanate of Rum, when they were tasked with subduing Baba Ishak. In 1277, they were involved in the fight against Jimri and Mehmed (r. 1263–1277) of Karaman in western Anatolia. Yakub I (r. 1300–1340) was the first Bey to rule the beylik of Germiyan. Although he initially accepted vassalage under Kayqubad III (r. 1298–1302), the Sultanate of Rum disintegrated shortly after. Yakub I was succeeded by his son Mehmed (r. 1340–1361), nicknamed Chakhshādan, details about whose rule are largely unknown. His son, Suleiman Shah (r. 1361–1387) eventually inherited the throne. Germiyan lost considerable land under Suleiman, as he gave numerous towns and smaller settlements to the Ottomans, including the capital Kütahya, as part of the dowry for the marriage of his daughter Devletşah Hatun to Ottoman Sultan Murad I's (r. 1362–1389) son and successor, Bayezid (r. 1389–1402).

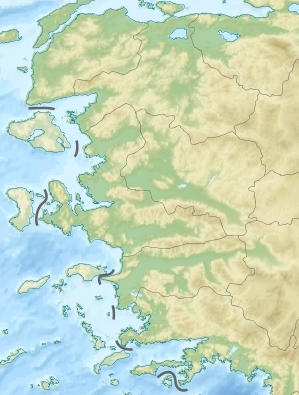
The locations of towns in western Anatolia.

== Early life and first reign ==
Yakub's parents were Suleiman Shah and a daughter of Umur, the ruler of the Aydinids in western Anatolia. Yakub was the wali (governor) of Uşak and Şuhut during his father's reign. He inherited the throne when his father died in 1387 and maintained peace in the realm until 1390. He supported the Ottoman Sultanate at the Battle of Kosovo along with the beyliks of Kastamonu, Saruhan, Aydın, Menteshe, and Hamid. However, when the Ottoman Sultan Murad I died in battle and was succeeded by his son Bayezid I, Yakub, as well as Kadi Burhan al-Din and the heads of Saruhan, Hamid, and Menteshe, sided with the Karamanids in a war against the Ottomans with the hopes that they could reclaim their land. While Karaman seized Beyşehir, Yakub started capturing some of the former possessions of Germiyan that his father had given to the Ottomans as part of Devletşah Hatun's dowry.

Before returning to Anatolia from the Balkans, Bayezid first ensured stability in the latter region by making peace with Serbia and concluding internal conflicts within the Byzantine Empire in his favor. Intimidated by Bayezid's seizure of Saruhan, Aydın, and Menteshe, Yakub attempted to return to good terms with him through various gifts but was nevertheless imprisoned and kept in the castle of Ipsala. In 1390, the entire realm of Germiyan came under Ottoman control, with Yakub no longer as its ruler. Sari Timurtash Pasha was appointed as the beylerbey (governor) of Anatolia Eyalet.

== Restoration of rule ==
Yakub sought the protection of Timur (r. 1370–1405) in 1399, having escaped from prison and traveled to Syria in disguise through the Mediterranean Sea presumably the same year. He allied with Timur against the Ottomans with the guarantee that his rule would be restored, and fought for him at the Battle of Ankara in 1402. The former troops of Germiyan, Aydın, and Menteshe were initially under Bayezid's command, but switched sides when it became clear that their leaders had sided with Timur. Yakub recognized the sultan during the skirmish and had him captured. The Ottomans were ultimately defeated, and Timur restored the former Germiyan possessions to Yakub. Timur stayed in Kütahya for some time, subjecting the inhabitants to a one-time tax and confiscating the treasury of Sari Timurtash Pasha.

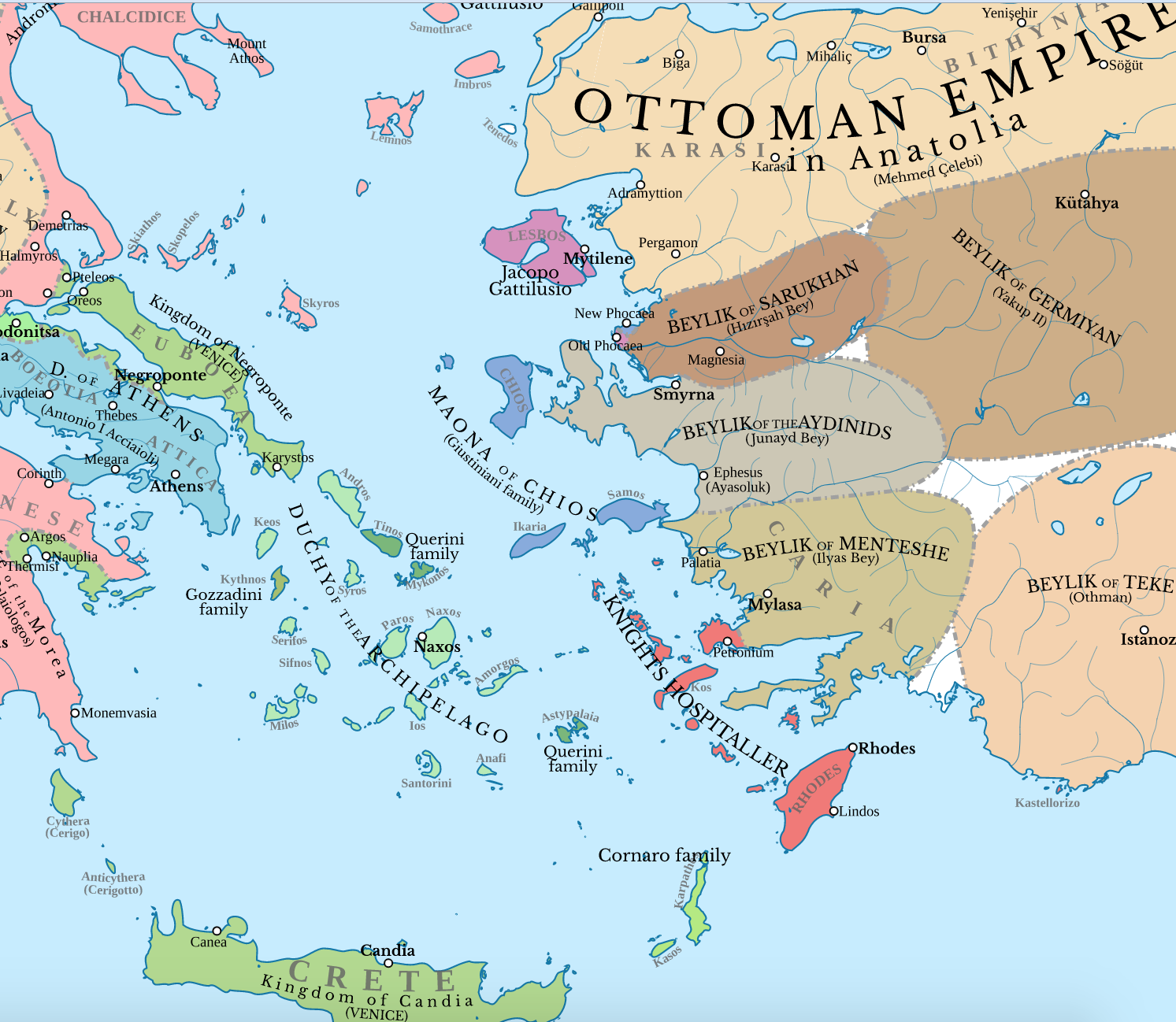
Germiyan, c. 1410

== Second and third reigns ==
During the Ottoman Interregnum (1402–1413), Yakub allied himself with the future Ottoman sultan Mehmed Chelebi (r. 1413–21), one of the sons of Bayezid, against his brothers. As a result, Germiyan–Karaman relations gradually transitioned into hostility, as the latter's rivalry against the Ottomans ensued. This escalated to a war between the two in September 1410, and Kütahya fell to Mehmed II of Karaman (r. 1398–99, 1402–20) the next year, which effectively ended Yakub's second reign. Mehmed II further laid siege to Bursa for 31 days in 1413 and set the city on fire, which prompted Mehmed Chelebi to quickly return to Anatolia after having defeated his brother, Musa Chelebi, in Rumelia. When Musa's remains were brought to Bursa, signaling the defeat, Mehmed II of Karaman retreated in a hurry and left the territories he had taken from Germiyan. Mehmed Chelebi reinstated Yakub's rule in Germiyan in 1414. Yakub accommodated and supplied the Ottoman army during the following campaigns against Karaman. His rule until 1421 was largely free of threats.

When Mehmed Chelebi's son Murad II rose to the Ottoman throne, Yakub's relations with the Ottomans took a new turn. Murad's younger brother and governor of Hamid, Mustafa Chelebi was sponsored by Yakub, Karaman, and the Turghudlu tribe of Turkmens as a claimant to the Ottoman throne. Mustafa besieged and gained control of Iznik, and declared himself ruler, taking advantage of Murad's investment in the Siege of Constantinople (1422). However, the local Ottoman guardians did not allow Mustafa to depart from the city, on the orders of the sultan. Murad swiftly reclaimed control of the city and executed Mustafa. Yakub then reverted to friendly interactions with Murad, realizing that he had no other choice to survive. Even though Aydın and Menteshe were already under direct Ottoman control, Murad did not attempt to enact his sovereignty in Germiyan. By then, it had become subordinate to the Ottomans with their constant military involvement in the region. Likewise, Yakub bequeathed his domains to Murad, as he had no sons and did not want to hand over the rule to his sister's children, who were Murad II's half-uncles. In 1428, at an old age, he traveled to Bursa and paid respects to the graves of Osman I and Orhan. He was later welcomed by Murad in a lavish ceremony in Edirne and formally declared his will there. Sometime after returning to Germiyan, he fell sick, dying in January 1429. Murad annexed Germiyan as requested by Yakub, which brought the history of Germiyan to an end.

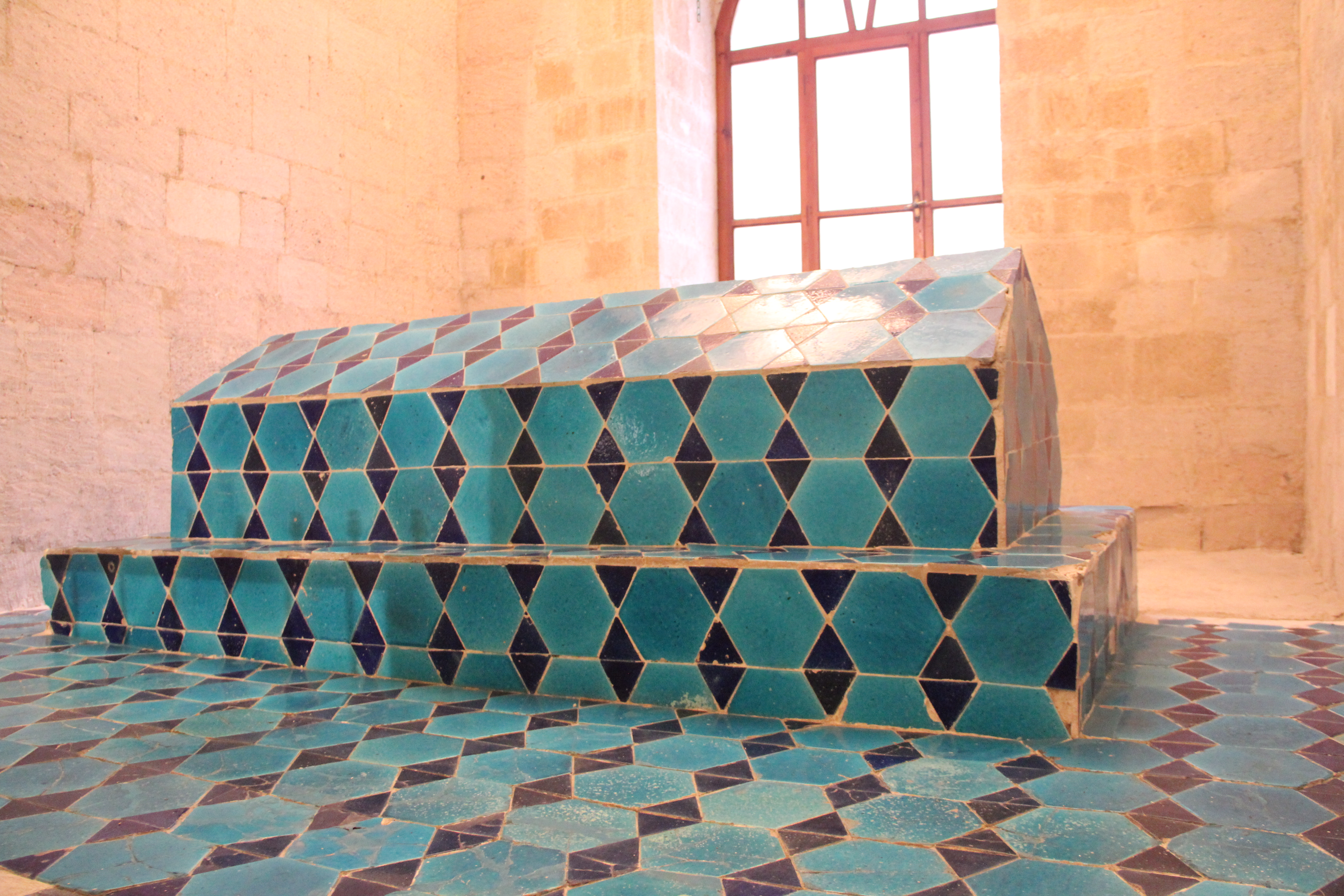
Yakub's grave in the Encaustic Tile Museum (Yakub Chelebi Külliye) in Kütahya.

== Patronage ==
The Germiyanid palace became a center of science and literature during Yakub II's reign. Poet Sheikhi Sinan was known as a musahib (compatriot) of Yakub. The Persian work Tabirname was translated into Turkish by Ahmed-i Dai on the orders of Yakub II.

Yakub's architectural legacy included the Yakub Chelebi Külliye (building complex) in Kütahya. It was built in 1411–1412 and is composed of an imaret, masjid, türbe (tomb), madrasa (school), and library. After five months of operation, the Karamanid occupation forced the imaret to close for two and a half years. In 1414, when the region was regained by the Ottoman Sultan Mehmed I on behalf of Yakub, the building returned to use, and inscriptions (vakfiye), 2 by 3.70 meters in size, were added to the building, detailing its history. The inscriptions indicate that the imaret was owned by Mehmed I. It was later destroyed and the building was restored in accordance with its original form by its waqf (endowment) trustee Ishak Fakih bin Halil in 1440–41. In 1803, the Ottoman governor of Anatolia, Gurju Osman Pasha, commissioned its reparation and merged the imaret and the masjid. The tomb includes the sarcophagi of Yakub II and his wife Pasha Kerime Hatun, which are ornamented with encaustic tiles. The building was restored again in 1999 and reopened as the Encaustic Tile Museum.

== Bibliography ==
- Bilecik, Gülberk (2013). "Yâkub Çelebi Külliyesi". TDV Encyclopedia of Islam, Vol. 43 (Vekâlet – Yûsî) (in Turkish). Istanbul: Presidency of Religious Affairs, Centre for Islamic Studies. pp. 279–280. ISBN 978-975-389-754-9.
- Mélikoff, I. (1965). "Germiyān-Og̲h̲ullari̊̊". In Lewis, B.; Pellat, Ch. & Schacht, J. (eds.). The Encyclopaedia of Islam, Second Edition. Volume II: C–G. Leiden: E. J. Brill. OCLC 495469475.
- Uzunçarşılı, İsmail Hakkı (1969). Anadolu Beylikleri Ve Akkoyunlu, Karakoyunlu Devletleri [Anatolian Beyliks and Aq Qoyunlu, Qara Qoyunlu States] (in Turkish). Turkish Historical Society Press. ISBN 9751624576. OCLC 563553149.
- Varlık, Mustafa Çetin (1974). Germiyan-oğulları tarihi (1300–1429) (in Turkish). Ankara: Atatürk University Press. OCLC 6807984.
- Varlık, Mustafa Çetin (1996). "Germiyanoğulları". TDV Encyclopedia of Islam, Vol. 14 (Geli̇bolu – Haddesenâ) (in Turkish). Istanbul: Presidency of Religious Affairs, Centre for Islamic Studies. pp. 33–35. ISBN 978-975-389-441-8.
