= Mehdi Azar Yazdi =

Iranian writer (1922–2009)

Mehdi Azar-Yazdi
- مهدی‌ آذریزدی
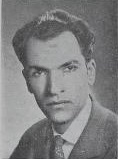
- Born: March 18, 1922; Yazd, Iran
- Died: July 9, 2009 (aged 87); Tehran, Iran
- Resting place: Yazd
- Education: None
- Occupations: Writer, poet, photographer
- Spouse: None
- Children: Mohammad Saburi (adopted)
- Writing career
- Language: Persian
- Years active: 1956–2009
- Genre: Children's literature
- Notable work: Good Stories for Good Children

Mehdi Azar-Yazdi (Persian: مهدی آذریزدی) (18 March 1922 – 9 July 2009) was an Iranian children's writer. He started his career in 1956. His books are adaptations of works of the Classical Persian literature re-written for children in an easy-to-understand style. His most notable book was the award-winning Good Stories for Good Children.

== Books ==
Azar-Yazdi's most famous work was Good Stories for Good Children (قصه‌های خوب برای بچه‌های خوب) written in eight volumes based on several works of Persian literature, including Kalila wa Dimna, Gulistan, Masnavi-e Ma'navi, Marzban-Nameh, Sinbad-Nameh, Qabus-Nameh, Maqalat of Shams Tabrizi, Jami'-ul-Hikayat, Siyasat-Nameh, and some stories from the Quran and the life of Muhammad and The Fourteen Infallibles. The book won a UNESCO award in 1966.

Good Stories for Good Children has been translated into various languages, including Spanish, Armenian, Chinese, and Russian.

Azar Yazdi planned to write other volumes for the series.

He was also author of The Naughty Cat, The Playful Cat, Simple Stories, Poetry of Sugar and Honey and Masnavi of Good Children.

Another one of his works, Adam, was chosen as the best book of the year in 1968.

== Personal life ==
Noted author of children's books Mehdi Azar-Yazdi was born in 1921 in Yazd. His ancestors were among Zoroastrians who converted to Islam. He learned to read and write from his father and later continued his studies on his own. While a teenager, he spent his time reading books, including Quran, Mafatih-ul-Jinan, Masnavi, Saadi Shirazi's works, and Divan of Hafez. In 1944, he left his hometown and came to live in Tehran. Azar Yazdi worked as a construction worker and a simple laborer in sock-weaving workshops, publishing houses and bookshops. He worked for noted publishing houses like Amir Kabir, Ashrafi and Etella'at.

He is survived by his adopted son Mohammad Saburi, who met Azar Yazdi in 1949. Mohammad had been referred for employment to a photography house in Yazd where Azar Yazdi used to work. Azar Yazdi was leaving the store when he came upon the eight-year-old Mohammad weeping after having been rejected by the owner of the business. He adopted him on the advice of one of his friends.

"Encouragement is the main factor that makes a person begin a task and continue it. I had no one encouraging me [when I was young], and my parents taunted me about writing childlike stories,"

Azar Yazdi once said during a ceremony was held by the Iranian Luminaries Association to honor him in February 2007.

"When I was 35 years old I left Yazd [his homeland] and afterward began reading Kalilah and Dimnah, which is very difficult. However, I found it very beautiful and subsequently decided to write for children. I sought neither fame nor money, I only wanted to do a good job. So I wrote Good Stories for Good Children,"

he said during the ceremony. Azar Yazdi never married. Once, he was asked the reason for this and he joked,

"I could not live with a crazy woman, and if she was a wise woman, she could never live with me!"

He believed that life owes him something, saying,

"I have frequently been only at someone else's service. I have always economized and have had a hard time of it."

"I never eat well, except at parties or here (at his adopted son's home in Karaj). I am never well-dressed. Some people consider me to be stingy because of my economical ways. When I have no income I have to economize. Thank God, that I have never done evil and never have had a bad reputation."

Azar Yazdi died in 2009 after a period of disease in Tehran Atiyeh hospital and his body is buried in his hometown, Yazd.

The day of his death has been chosen as the National Day of the Children's Literature.

== Awards ==
Azar Yazdi achieved national and international acclaim, most notably receiving the UNESCO Prize in 1964 for his seminal work, Good Stories for Good Children. In addition to this honor, he was also the recipient of the Children's Book Council of Iran Award. Azar Yazdi's legacy has been commemorated through various tributes and city landmarks; streets in Yazd and Tehran have been named in his honor. Furthermore, in recognition of his influence on Iranian literature, the anniversary of his death, July 8, has been officially designated as the National Day of Children's and Young Adult Literature in Iran.
