= Good Stories for Good Children =

- Short story by Mehdi Azar Yazdi
- Original title: قصه‌های خوب برای بچه‌های خوب
- Country: Iran
- Language: Persian
- Genre: Short story

Publication
- Publisher: Amirkabir
- Publication date: 1956

Good Stories for Good Children (Persian: قصه‌های خوب برای بچه‌های خوب) is a Persian language collection of children's classic fables rewritten by Mehdi Azar Yazdi in a language suitable for children. Yazdi published the first book of the 8-volume collection in 1956, through Amir Kabir Publishing House. For this work, he received the UNESCO Prize in 1963 and the Royal Book of the Year Award in 1966. Some books in the collection have also been recognized as selected books of the year by the Children's Book Council of Iran. The collection has been translated into Spanish, Armenian, Chinese, and Russian, Good Stories for Good Children is considered to be the best-selling book in the history of Iranian publishing.

== Volumes ==
Volumes of Good Stories for Good Children:

- Volume 1 - Tales of Kalīla wa-Dimna
- Volume 2 - Tales of Marzban-nama
- Volume 3 - Tales of Seven Wise Masters and Qabus-nama
- Volume 4 - Tales of the Masnavi
- Volume 5 - Tales of the Quran
- Volume 6 - Tales of Attar of Nishapur
- Volume 7 - Tales of Gulistan and Molestan
- Volume 8 - Tales of the Fourteen Infallibles
