= Noushafarin Ansari =

Iranian librarian, educator and manager (born 1939)

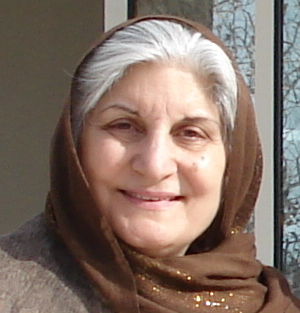
- Ansari in 2007
- Born: 1939 (age 86–87); Simla, India
- Other name: Noushin Ansari
- Education: PhD in Library Sciences
- Occupations: University Professor, educator, and secretary general of Children's Book Council of Iran
- Spouse: Mehdi Mohaghegh
- Parent(s): Abdolhossein Masoud Ansari and Fatemeh Masoud Ansari

Noushafarin (Noushin) Ansari (Persian: نوش‌آفرین انصاری; born 1939 in Simla, India) is an Iranian librarian, educator, and manager.

== Life ==
Her parents were diplomats; therefore she was exposed to many languages and cultures in Asia and Europe. In 1958-1960 she studied librarianship in Geneva, a discipline she continued at McGill University and at the University of Toronto. She worked as a librarian at the Delhi Public Library, and Tehran University Central library, and was Library Director at the Faculty of Literature and Humanities at Tehran University. In 1962 she married Mehdi Mohaghegh, a renowned Iranian university professor and scholar.

Ansari started teaching at the Faculty of Library and Information Science at Tehran University in 1968 and retired in 2000. Early in her career she joined the Children's Book Council of Iran, a non-profit organization, and was elected Secretary General in 1978 to date as of 2012; she has played a substantial role in the development of this organization. She was awarded the Iran National Book Award in 1988, was a keynote speaker at the 28th IBBY (International Board on Books for Young People) Congress in Basel, Switzerland in 2002, and was nationally honored by the Society for the Appreciation of Cultural Works and Dignitaries in Tehran in 2004.

== Publications ==
- Views of European travellers about Sa'di and Hafiz", Proceedings of the International Congress on Sa'di and Hafiz, Shiraz, 1973.
- Western Libraries as described by Iranian travellers", Nashre Danesh, vol. 3, no. 4, 1983.
- Libraries and reading rooms in Iran", in Mahmoud Afshar Endowment Foundation Collection, 1987.
- Manuscripts and their organization in Iran", COMLIS Collected Papers, 1998.
- The right to books as a global commitment", Proceedings 28th IBBY Congress Basel, 2002. (English)
- Collected articles on books and librarianship. Tehran: Tous, 1975.
- Translation of "Introduction to the History of Muslim East", by Jean Sauvaget. University Press Center, 1987 (winner of 1988 Iran National Book Award).
