= Yakup Çelebi =

Yakup Çelebi may refer to:

- Yakup II of Germiyan
- Yakub Çelebi
