= Hacıbektaş District =

District of Nevşehir Province, Turkey

- District
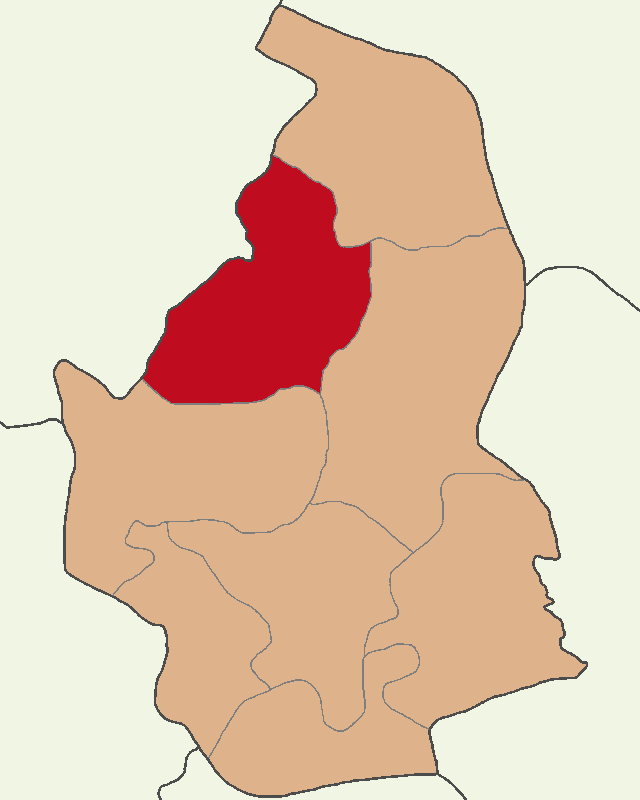
- Map showing Hacıbektaş District in Nevşehir Province

- Location in Turkey Hacıbektaş District (Turkey Central Anatolia)
- Coordinates: 38°57′N 34°34′E
- Country: Turkey
- Province: Nevşehir
- Seat: Hacıbektaş

Government
  - Kaymakam: İbrahim Engin Şenay
- Area: 750 km^{2} (290 sq mi)
- Population (2022): 10,884
  - Density: 15/km^{2} (38/sq mi)
- Time zone: UTC+3 (TRT)
- Website: www.hacibektas.gov.tr

Hacıbektaş District is a district of the Nevşehir Province of Turkey. Its seat is the town of Hacıbektaş. Its area is 750 km^{2}, and its population is 10,884 (2022). Its highest point is Mt. Kırlangıç at 1,720 m (5,643 ft).

== Composition ==
There is one municipality in Hacıbektaş District:

- Hacıbektaş

There are 30 villages in Hacıbektaş District:

- Akçataş
- Anapınar
- Aşağıbarak
- Aşıklar
- Avuç
- Başköy
- Belbarak
- Büyük Kayı
- Büyükburunağıl
- Büyükkışla
- Çiğdem
- Çivril
- Hasanlar
- Hıdırlar
- Hırkatepesidelik
- İlicek
- Karaburç
- Karaburna
- Karaova
- Kayaaltı
- Kayı
- Killik
- Kızılağıl
- Kösektaş
- Kütükçü
- Mikail
- Sadık
- Yenice
- Yeniyapan
- Yurtyeri
