= Mehdi Mohaghegh =

Iranian academic

- Born: 30 January 1930 (age 96); Mashhad, Iran
- Education: PhD in Persian Literature, Theology and Certification of Ijtihad
- Occupations: University Professor, Director of the Society For The Appreciation Of Cultural Works And Dignitaries
- Spouse: Noushafarin Ansari

Mehdi Mohaghegh, sometimes transliterated Mahdi Muhaqqiq, (Persian: مهدی محقق, born 1930, Mashad, Iran) is an Iranian scholar specializing in Persian literature, Islamic studies and philosophy.

He has a Ph.D. in both Ilahiyyat (theology) and Persian language and literature; he joined The Faculty of Literature and Humanities at Tehran University in 1960. He has been teaching at the School of Oriental and African Studies in England (1961-1963), McGill University Institute of Islamic Studies in Canada (1965-1998), and The International Institute of Islamic Thought and Civilization in Malaysia (1991-1996). He is founder and director of the McGill Institute of Islamic Studies Tehran Branch since 1968, where he has collaborated with Toshihiko Izutsu and Herman Landolt on several important projects. Professor Mohaghegh is the author and editor of more than fifty books and over two hundred and ten articles on Persian language and literature, Islamic philosophy and mysticism, and the history of Islamic medicine in Persian, Arabic and English. He is a vice-president of Indian originated Ibn Sina Academy of Medieval Medicine and Sciences since its inception, a member of the Academy of Persian Language and Literature, the Egyptian and Syrian Academies of Arabic Language as well as the Royal Academy of Al al-Bayt in Jordan. He is Executive Director of the Society for the Appreciation of Cultural works and Dignitaries, and President of the Iranian Society for the Promotion of Persian Language and Literature in Tehran, Iran.

== See also ==
- Noushafarin Ansari, wife

== Sources ==
1-^
