= Köşektaş, Hacıbektaş =

Köşektaş
- Village
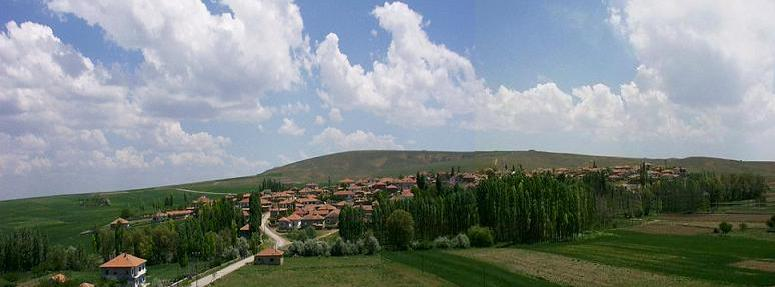

- Location within Turkey Location within Turkey Central Anatolia
- Coordinates: 38°59′N 34°45′E
- Country: Turkey
- Province: Nevşehir
- District: Hacıbektaş
- Elevation: 1,250 m (4,100 ft)
- Population (2022): 356
- Time zone: UTC+3 (TRT)
- Area code: 0384
- Website: www.kosektas.net

Köşektaş is a village in Hacıbektaş District, Nevşehir Province in the Central Anatolia Region of Turkey. Its population is 356 (2022).

The village is located on the plains at the northern foot of Cappadocia and is 17 kilometers from the Hacıbektaş and, 240 kilometers from the capital, Ankara. Köşektaş takes its name from a rock (Köşektaş Kayası), which is located at the northwest corner of the village.
