= Mehmed of Germiyan =

Bey of Germiyan from 1340 to 1361

Mehmed Chakhshadan
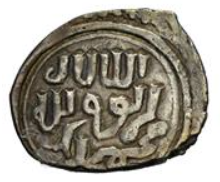
- Undated coin minted by Mehmed.

Bey of Germiyan
- Reign: 1340–1361
- Predecessor: Yakub I
- Successor: Suleiman Shah
- Issue: Suleiman Shah
- Dynasty: Germiyan
- Father: Yakub I
- Religion: Islam

Mehmed Chakhshadan was Bey of Germiyan from 1340 to 1361. He retook Kula and Angir from the Catalan Company.

== In popular culture ==
- In the 2019 Turkish historical fiction TV series Kuruluş: Osman, Mehmed Bey was portrayed by Turkish actor Emre Dinler.
- In the 2025–2026 Turkish historical fiction TV series Kuruluş: Orhan, Mehmed Bey was portrayed by Turkish actor Baran Akbulut.

== Bibliography ==
- Varlık, Mustafa Çetin (1996). "Germiyanoğulları". TDV Encyclopedia of Islam, Vol. 14 (Geli̇bolu – Haddesenâ) (in Turkish). Istanbul: Presidency of Religious Affairs, Centre for Islamic Studies. pp. 33–35. ISBN 978-975-389-441-8.
