= Devletşah Hatun =

Consort of Sultan Bayezid I

Devletşah Sultan Hatun
- Born: c. 1365; Kütahya, Germiyan
- Died: 23 January 1414 (aged 48–49); Bursa, Ottoman Empire
- Spouse: Bayezid I
- Issue: İsa Çelebi; Musa Çelebi
- House: Germiyanid (by birth); Ottoman (by marriage)
- Father: Süleyman of Germiyan
- Mother: Mutahhare Abide Hatun

Devletşah Sultan Hatun (Ottoman Turkish: دولت شاه خاتون سلطان, "reign of the Şah" or "sovereign of the reign", c. 1365 - 23 January 1414), was a daughter of Süleyman Şah Bey, the ruler of the Germiyanids. She was a consort of Sultan Bayezid I of the Ottoman Empire.

== Family ==
Devletşah Hatun was born to an Anatolian prince, Süleyman Şah Bey, the ruler of the Germiyanids. Her mother Mutahhare Abide Hatun was a great-granddaughter of Mawlānā Jalal al-Din Muhammad Rumi, the founder of the Sufi order of Mevlevis, through his son Sultan Walad. She had three full-brothers, Ilyas Pasha, Hızır Pasha and Qurd Abdal, an half-brother, Yakub, and several full-sisters and half-sisters.

== Marriage ==
In 1378, Süleyman Şah sent an envoy to sultan Murad I, proposing a marriage between his daughter, Devletşah Hatun and his son Bayezid. He wished to protect his territory against the invasions of the Karamanids, had proposed this marriage and had offered, as a dowry to his daughter, Kütahya, his seat of power and several other Germiyan cities. Murad agreed and acquired most of the principality.

The chroniclers testify of the riches that were displayed during the wedding feast. Envoys from the Karamanids, Hamidoğu, Mentesheoğlu, Saruhanids, Isfendiyarids and an envoy of the Mamluk sultan were all present at the wedding feast. The chroniclers describe the valuable presents brought by Gazi Evrenos, the Ottoman marcher lord (akıncı uç beyi) in Europe, to the wedding, which included among other items cloths of gold, two hundred gold and silver trays filled with gold florins.

During the wedding feast, the envoy of Hüseyin Bey, the ruler of the Hamidili principality, offered to sell his beylik to Murad. When, afterwards, Murad came to Kütahya, Hüseyin Bey sent his envoy to conclude the formalities of the sale.

== Issue ==
By Bayezid I, Devletşah had two sons:

- Isa Çelebi (1380 - 1403) - Governor of Anatolia, claimant to the Ottoman throne during the Ottoman Interregnum.
- Musa Çelebi (died in 1413) - Sultan of Rumelia, claimant to the Ottoman throne during the Ottoman Interregnum.

Historian Necdet Sakaoğlu also suggests that Fatma Hundi Hatun may have been her daughter.

== See also ==
- List of consorts of the Ottoman Sultans

== Sources ==
- Akgunduz, Ahmed; Ozturk, Said (2011). Ottoman History - Misperceptions and Truths. IUR Press.
- Kaçar, Hilmi (2015). A Mirror for the Sultan: State Ideology in the Early Ottoman Chronicles, 1300-1453. Universiteit Gent, Faculteit Letteren & Wijsbegeerte.
