= Hacıbektaş =

- Municipality

- Location within Turkey Location within Turkey Central Anatolia
- Coordinates: 38°56′37″N 34°33′35″E
- Country: Turkey
- Province: Nevşehir
- District: Hacıbektaş

Government
  - Mayor: Ali Kaim (TİP)
- Elevation: 1,275 m (4,183 ft)
- Population (2022): 5,325
- Time zone: UTC+3 (TRT)
- Area code: 0384
- Climate: Csb
- Website: www.hacibektas.bel.tr

Hacıbektaş (historically Sulucakarahöyük) is a town and district of Nevşehir Province in the Central Anatolia region of Turkey. It is the seat of Hacıbektaş District. Its population is 5,325 (2022). Located in Cappadocia, its elevation is 1,275 m (4,183 ft). The town is named after Haji Bektash Veli, a 13th-century Sufi saint who founded the Bektashi Order.

== History ==
W. M. Ramsay identified the town as one of the possible locations of Doara, an ancient town and bishopric. Modern scholars place it elsewhere. From 1867 until 1922, Hacıbektaş was part of Angora vilayet.

For centuries, Hacıbektaş has served as the international headquarters of the Bektashi Order until Atatürk outlawed all dervish orders in 1925. In 1930, the Bektashi Order officially set up its new headquarters in Tirana, Albania.

== Notable residents ==
Haji Bektash Veli, the founder of the Bektashi order of Sufism, lived in the area in the 14th century and is commemorated by the town's current name and in an annual festival. His tomb known as the Hajibektash complex is located near the center of town in his former monastery, now a museum, and is a site of pilgrimage for both Alevis and Bektashis from throughout Turkey and the world.

== Gallery ==
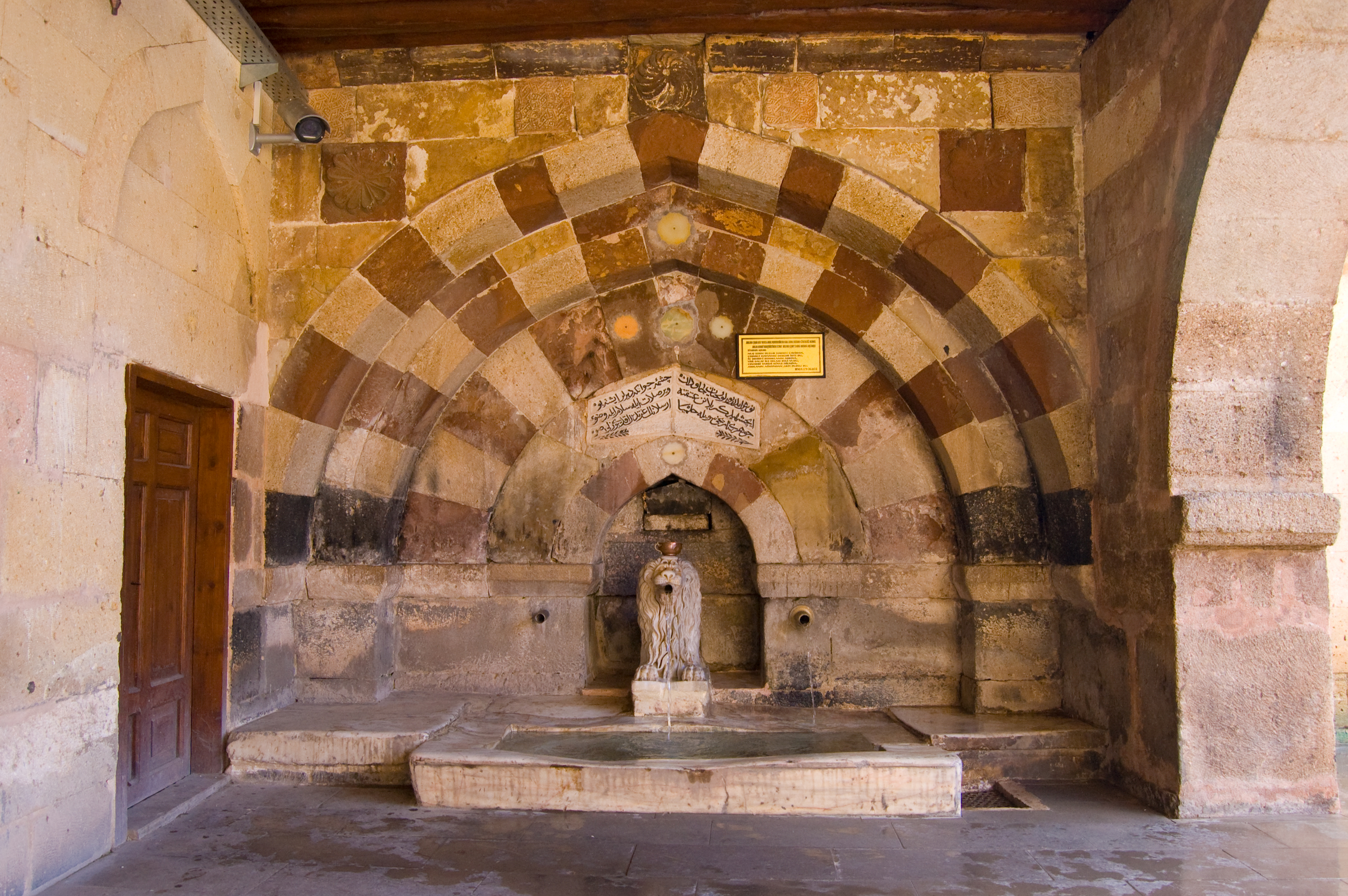
Fountain inside Hacıbektaş Veli Complex

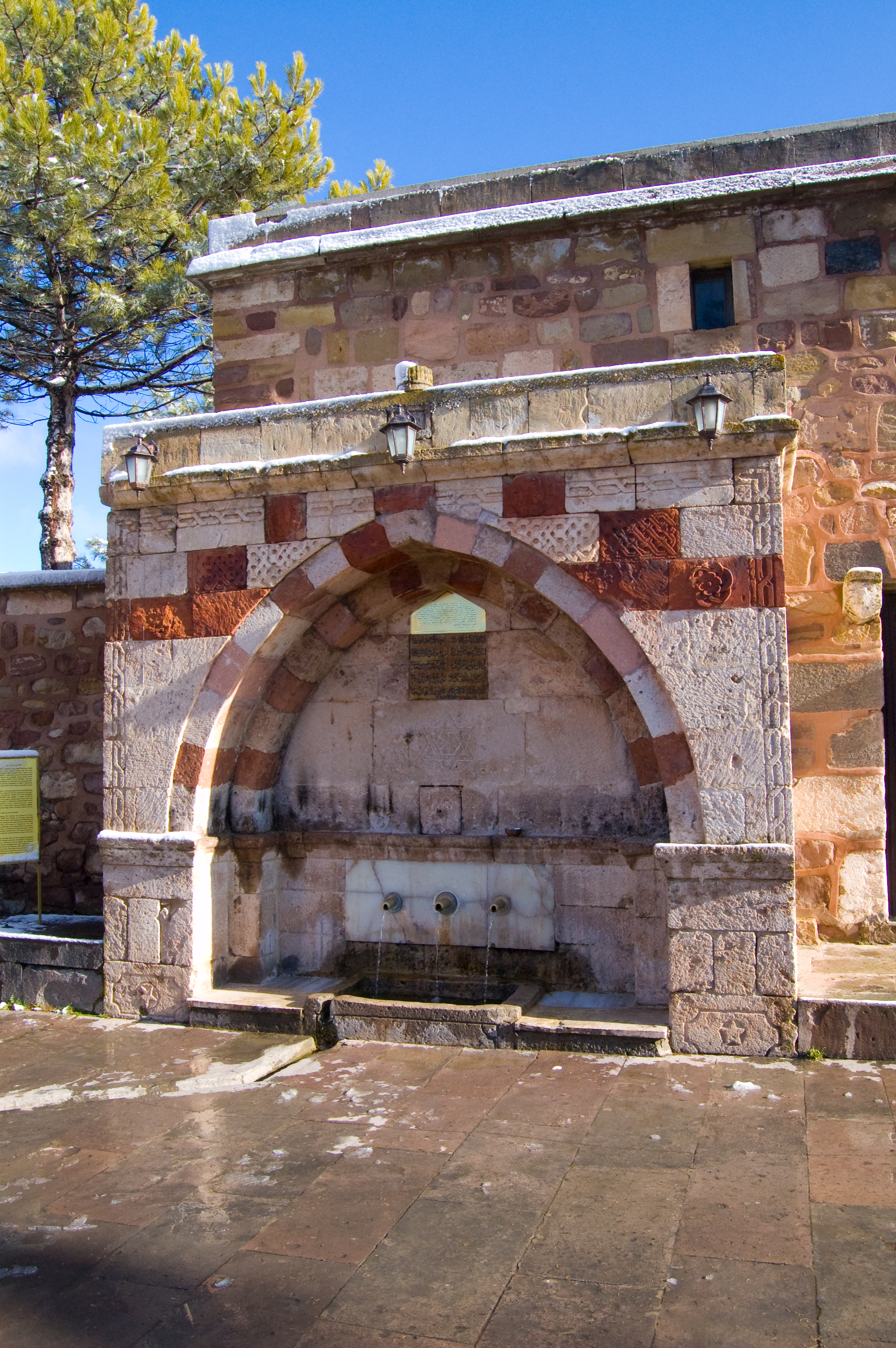
A fountain in Hacıbektaş

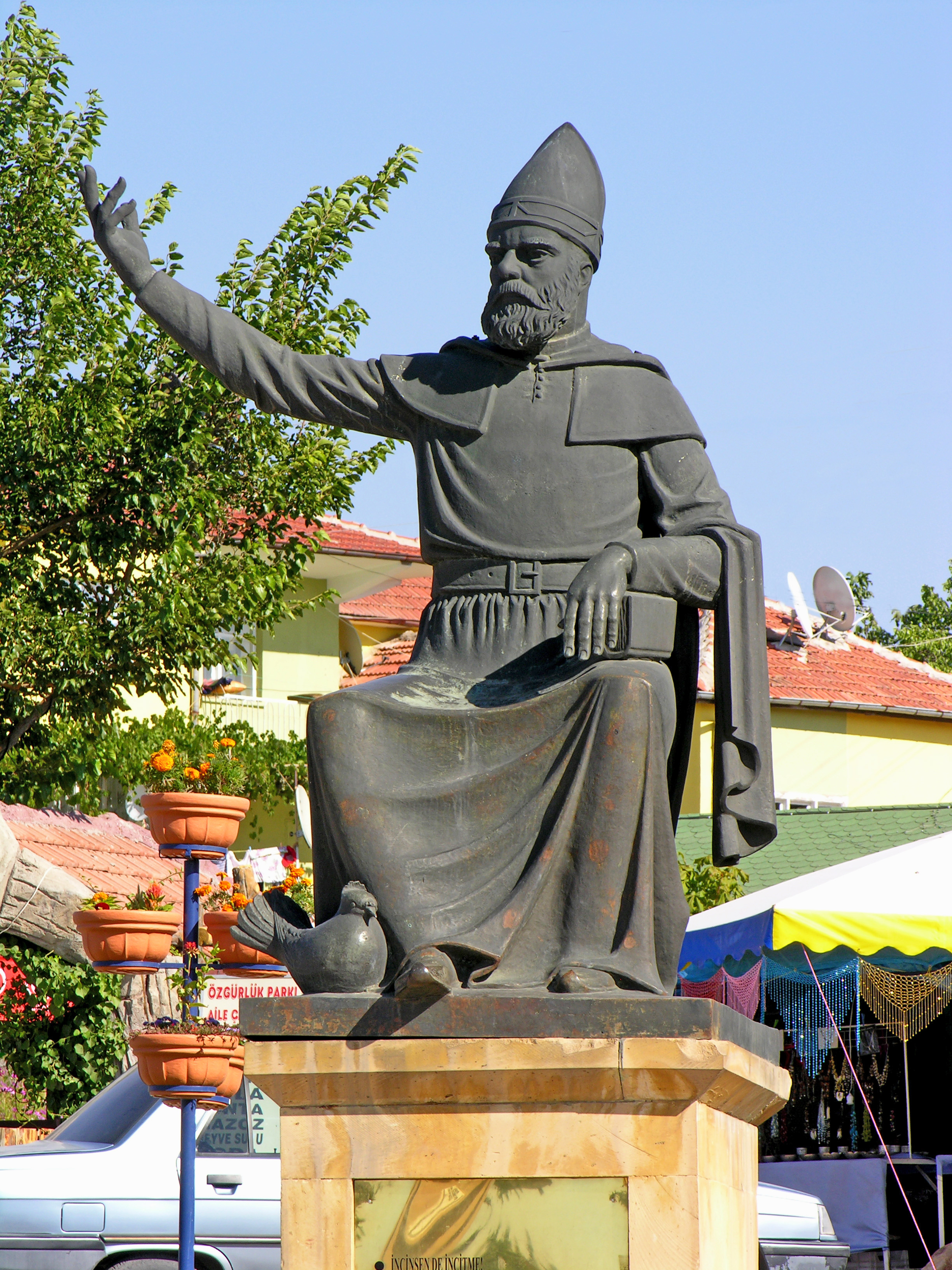
A statue of Hacı Bektaş Veli

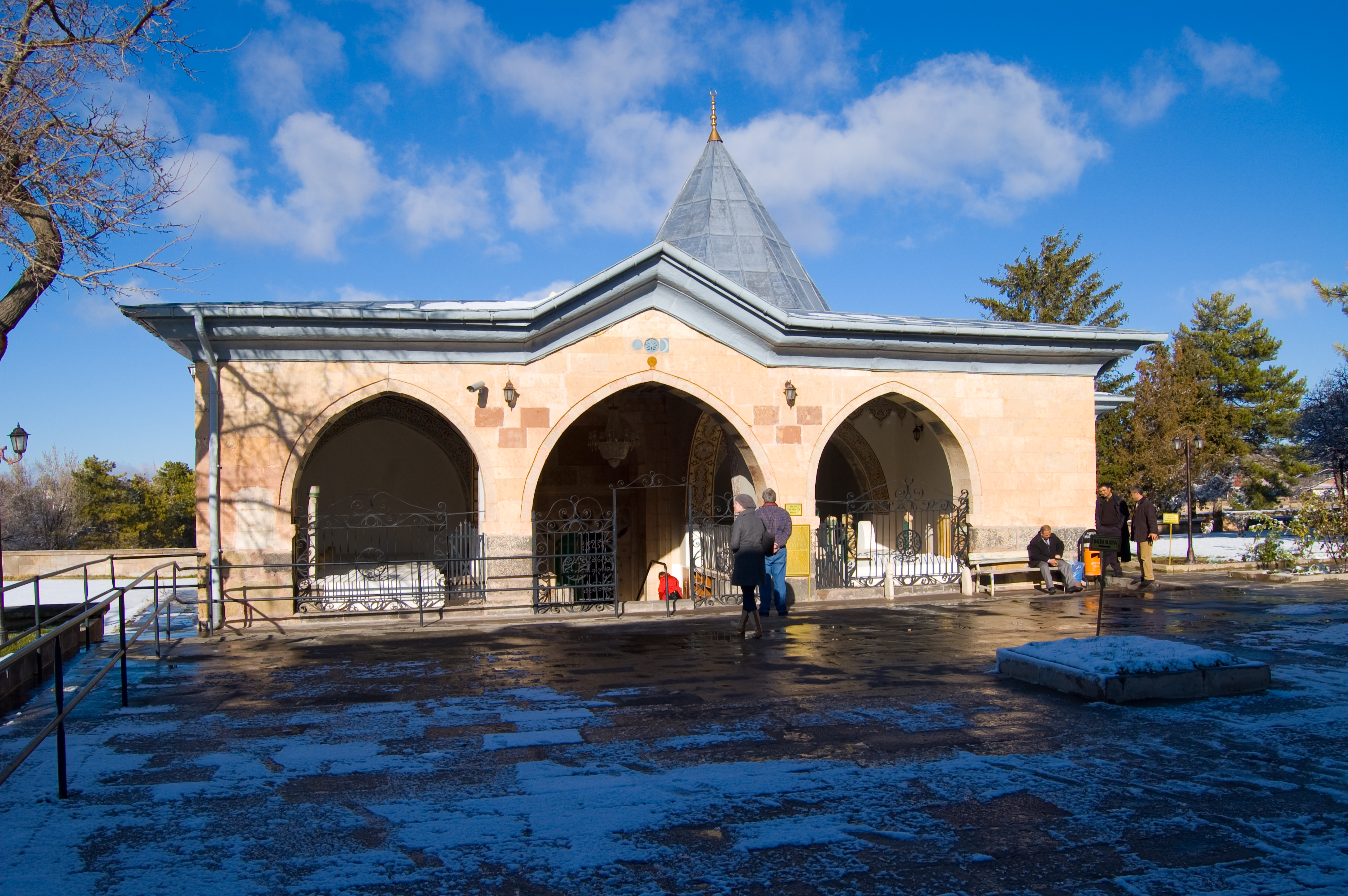
Front view of Hacıbektaş Veli Complex

== See also ==
- Sufism
- Bektashism
