= Mustafa Sheykhoghlu =

Ottoman poet (1341–1410s)

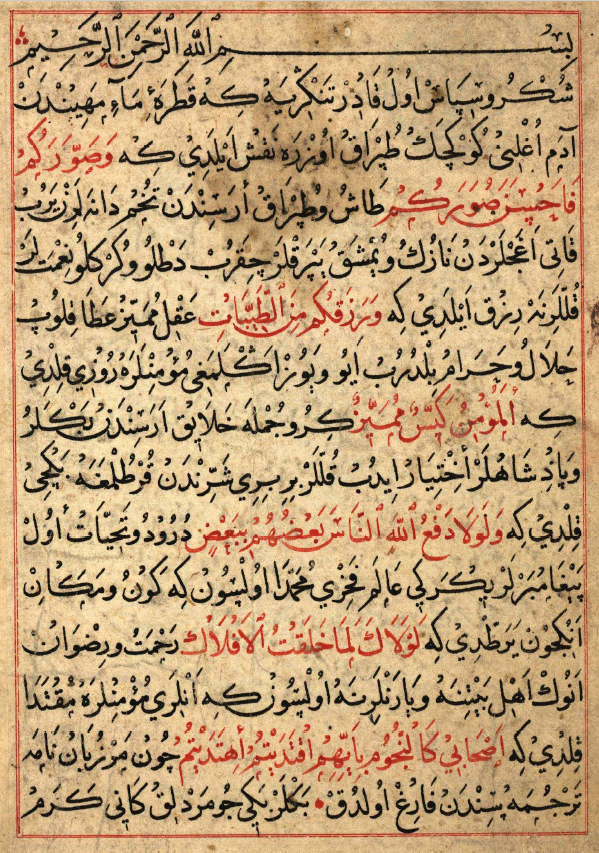
Translation of Qabus-nama by Sheykhoghlu

Sadraldin Mustafa Sheykhoghlu (Turkish: Sadrüddin Mustafa Şeyhoğlu; 1340/1341 – c. 1410) was a Turkish poet and translator who had major influence on Ottoman diwan poetry especially the masnavi genre. Some sources have referred to him as "Mustafa Sheykhoghlu" or "Sadraldin Sheykhoghlu". The date of his death have been quoted around 1341 but its place is unknown.

== Works ==
His most famous is "Khurshid Nameh" which is also referred to as "Khurshid u Ferakhshad" and "Shehristan-i Ushagh". Other works are translations of Marzban nama, Qabus nama and Kenz ul-kubera.
