= Babai revolt =

1240 insurrection in the Sultanate of Rum

Babai Revolt
Date	1240–1241
Location	Anatolia
Result	Revolt suppressed; Sultanate of Rum weakened and could not resist Mongol invasions and conquests

Belligerents
Sultanate of Rum	Babais

Commanders and leaders
Kaykhusraw II	Baba İshak (executed); Baba Ilyas (executed)

Strength
60,000	6,000

Casualties and losses
40,000	All Babais were killed

The Babai revolt was a thirteenth-century rebellion that took place in the southeastern territories of the Sultanate of Rum starting in 1239 and lasting for three years. The revolt was spearheaded by Baba Ishak, who led the Turkomans against the authority of the Sultanate.

== The revolt ==
Gıyasettin had ceded power to his ministers, notably Sa'd al-Din Köpek, who was suspicious of a rebellion by Afshar immigrants who had settled in Anatolia, migrating from Persia after the Mongol invasion. He accordingly imprisoned the suspects which led to their movement towards Aleppo within the Nizari Ismaili state. He had the leaders from Khwarazm imprisoned.

The revolt began in 1239 around Samsat (now in Adıyaman Province) and spread quickly to Central Anatolia. Baba Ishak, who led the revolt, was a follower of Baba Ilyas, the qadi (judge) of Kayseri. He declared himself Amir al-Mu'minin, Sadr al-Dunya wa l-Dīn, and "Messenger of God." Although the Seljuk governor of Malatya tried to suppress the revolt he was defeated by the revolutionaries around Elbistan (in modern Kahramanmaraş Province). The revolutionaries captured the important cities of Sivas, Kayseri and Tokat in Central and North Anatolia. The governor of Amasya killed Baba Ishak in 1240, but this did not mean the end of the revolt. The revolutionaries marched on Konya, the capital. The sultan saw that his army could not suppress the revolt, and he hired mercenaries of French origin. The revolutionaries were defeated in a decisive battle on the Malya plains near Kırşehir.

=== Bābā Eliyās al-Khorāsānī ===
Bābā Eliyās al-Khorāsānī († 1240) was an influential mystic from Greater Khorasan, who was the murshid of Aybak Bābā who in turn was the murshid of one of the leading actors of the Babais Rebellion, namely Baba Ishak as well. Eventually, Bābā Eliyās Khorāsānī was held responsible for the insurrection organized by Bābā Ishāq Kafarsudī, and consequently executed by Mubāriz’ud-Dīn-i Armāğān-Shāh, the supreme commander-in-chief of the armies of Rum.

== Aftermath ==
The revolt was suppressed with much bloodshed. However with the diversion of resources needed to suppress the revolt, the Seljuk army was severely affected. The defence of the eastern provinces was largely ignored, and most of Anatolia was plundered. The Seljuks lost the valuable trade colony in Crimea on the north of the Black Sea. The Mongol commander Baiju Noyan saw this as an opportunity to occupy East Anatolia, and in 1242 he captured Erzurum. In 1243, he defeated Kaykhosrow's army in the battle of Köse Dağ, and the Seljuks became vassals of the Mongols.

== See also ==
- Baba Ishak
- Dada Kārkğın (in Turkish)
- Baba Ilyas
- The Bābāīs (in Turkish)
