= Baba Ilyas =

Leader of the Babai revolt (died 1240)

Sheikh Abu al-Baqaa Baba Ilyas-i Khorasani, simply known as Baba Ilyas, was the leader of the Babai revolt against the Sultanate of Rum. He migrated to Anatolia from the Khwarazmian Empire following the Mongol invasion and settled in the village of İlyas, then known as Chat.

== Bibliography ==
- Ocak, Ahmet Yaşar (1991). "Baba İlyas". TDV Encyclopedia of Islam, Vol. 4 (Âşik Ömer – Bâlâ Külli̇yesi̇) (in Turkish). Istanbul: Presidency of Religious Affairs, Centre for Islamic Studies. p. 368. ISBN 978-975-389-431-9.
