= Baba Ishak =

Turkmen rebel

- Born: Sultanate of Rûm
- Died: 1241; Sultanate of Rûm
- Criminal charges: Rebellion against State, Treason, Vandalism
- Penalty: Hanged to death (execution)

Details
- Victims: unknown
- Date: 1239 –1241
- Killed: unknown

Baba Ishak, also spelled Baba Ishāq, Babaî, or Bābā’ī, a 13th-century preacher, led an uprising of the Turkoman of Anatolia against the Seljuq Sultanate of Rûm well known as Babai Revolt c. 1239 until he was hanged in 1241.

== Background ==
It had a become a common practice on Turk lands under the Seljuk reign for these "baba's" to spread their "aggregated band of religiosity under the apparent guise of Sufism". "Their extra-Islamic beliefs and non-shari'atic practices had a major influence on Turkish masses, especially those who had remained superficially-Islamized Muslims. It was for the same reasons and in the same regions that these non-orthodox Sufis set out a series of clashes against orthodox Sunnite authorities". "Since the emergence of Babas, the religious distance between the non-orthodox Sufism and orthodox Islam continued to broaden. As the former enlarged their dominance, the tension between the two had grown. At the peak of this tension occurred the first and most severe clash of Anatolian history, known as the Babai Rebellion (1240) wherein Baba Ishak and his followers revolted against the Seljuk sultanate".

== Key Events ==
When Kayqubad I became sultan, he had appointed “Mūhy’ad-Dîn Muhammad bin Ali bin Ahmad Tahīmī”, an Iranian Shia as the kadı of Sivas. "Bābā Ishāk Kafarsudī" was the student of this bātīn’īyyah Sufi philosopher in Shiraz. According to Turkish historian Hüseyin Hüsameddin (1869–1939), Bābā Ishāk Kafarsudī was actually a member of “Binaz/Komnenos Dynasty” and planning to establish a Christian vassal state in Amasya for the “Komnenos Dynasty.” He was disguising his true identity and preaching a creed of mixture of Muslim-Christian belief. According to Tahir Harimi Balcıoğlu, while attending the lectures of Mūhy’ad-Dīn in Shiraz, Bābā Ishāk Kafarsudī was appointed by “the President of the Nizārī Ismā'īlī state and Nizārī Ismā'īlī Da’i Â’zām Nūr’ad-Dīn Muhammad Sānī ibn Ḥasan ʿAlā of the Alamūt Hūkūmat-ee Malāheda-ee Bātīn’īyyah” as the Anatolian Da'i for the mission of the Shiʿa-ee Bātīn’īyyah.

According to Ibn Bibi, the celebrated Seljuk historian, Baba Ishaq was a Turkish holy man who practiced his gifted magic and its related arts like talismans. Having preached among Turkish tribes, he acquired a large number of followers, Turkmen and Christian alike, in various parts of Anatolia, and became one of the greatest Qalandar babas. Baba Ishak proclaimed himself as the prophet or the messiah, and thus was revered with the title Baba Rasul Allah among his followers. His followers used to think that Baba Ishak was immortal. Baba's followers clearly wanted to get away from basic orthodox Islamic teaching and wanted to drink alcohol and pray with music. They did not want to go to mosques or fast in Ramadan. Hamad Subani has researched on this further and established a relation between their practices and those of early Jews and Christians.

As the dominance of his influence with this belief was growing enough, Baba excited his followers to do armed "jihad" (using an Islamic term to satisfy his personal objectives), against the sultan's regime. In the consequent clash, while the followers of Baba Ishak took over several prominent cities of the north eastern Anatolia, their Baba, so called, Rasool Allah, was captured and executed (1240).

This uprising is claimed to have contributed to weakening of Seljuk empire eventually leading to take over of much of Central and Eastern Anatolia by Mongols in 1243.

Baba Ishhaq and Shiat-ul-Ali

== See also ==
- (in Turkish) "Ebu'l Vefâ"
- (in Turkish) "Dede Karkğın"
- Baba Ilyas
- (in Turkish) "Babâîlik"

== Sources ==
- Claude Cahen, “Bābā’ī,” Encyclopaedia of Islam, edited by P. Bearman, et al. (Brill, 2007).
- Claude Cahen, Pre-Ottoman Turkey: a general survey of the material and spiritual culture and history, trans. J. Jones-Williams (New York: Taplinger, 1968), 136–7.
- Speros Vryonis, The Decline of Medieval Hellenism in Asia Minor and the Process of Islamization from the Eleventh through the Fifteenth Century (University of California Press, 1971), 134.
