= Children's Book Council of Iran =

Non-profit organization

The Children's Book Council of Iran (CBC) was founded in 1962. CBC is a non-profit organization formed and run by volunteers. It joined the International Board on Books for Young People (IBBY) in 1964 and represents the Iranian National Section.

== Background ==
The rich oral literature of the early Persian families, comprising lullabies, folktales, and rhythmic fables, narrated by generations of Persian families, dates back over 3000 years.

Iran's societal and cultural requirements have recently prompted a new generation of children's literature. Thus, children's literature became an expertise, and historical studies became necessary to extend a developing children's literature in Iran. Several studies have been undertaken as a result of these efforts. The project on "The History of Children's Literature in Iran" is considered one of the most significant in recent times.

== Genres ==
Over 200 experts and members of Children's Books Council workgroups have contributed to the bibliography of 1438 books in a variety of genres. These include literature, novels, plays, poems, reference books, philosophy, religious literature, social knowledge, science, works written by children and young adults, art, games and entertainment, biographies, and electronic publications. Some of these genres are:

=== Ancient literature ===
- Nabāt Khānoomi
- Namaki
- The Amazing Stories of Shahnameh
- The Delightful Stories of one Thousand and One Nights 2
- Zahr-al Rabi, A book of sweet humor and comedy
- The Rolling Pumpkin
- Nokhodi
- The Sweet Fable of Darab Nama
- The Delightful Stories of one Thousand and One Nights 3
- Nizāmi Aroozi’s Four Articles

=== Fantasy books by Iranian authors ===
- The Distance that Grew Old
- The Memory Album
- The Story of the Stray Point
- Chichi the Crow
- Ashi Mashi - the Little Sparrow

=== Poems ===
- Behind the Scene in My Heart
- Whom Does God Miss?

== Awards ==
Zohreh Qaini, a specialist in children's literature, was nominated for the award in 2021, and Nader Musavi was nominated for the award in 2022.
