= Marzban-nama =

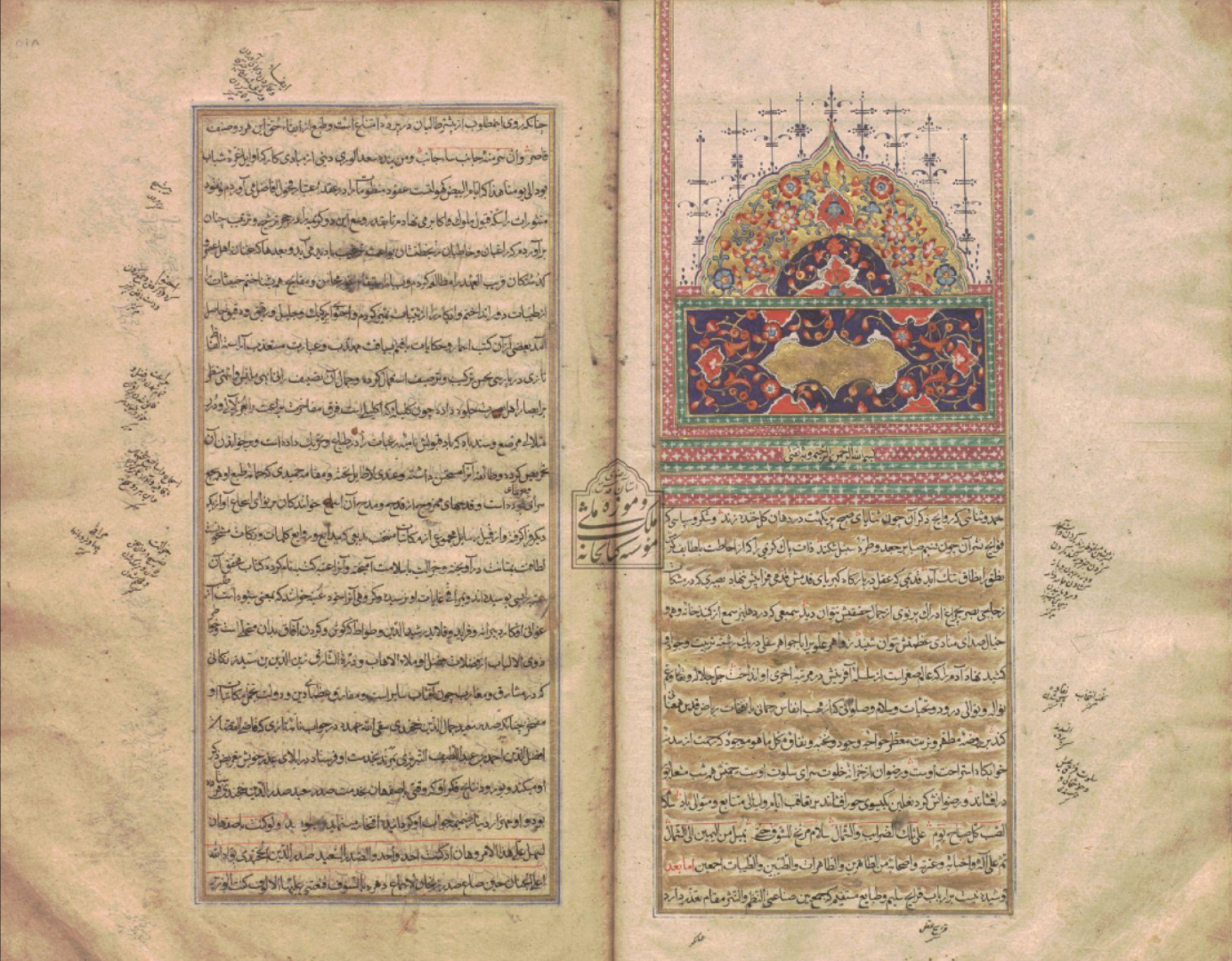
- Folio from a manuscript of the Marzban-nama stored in the Malek National Museum and Library, Tehran
- Author: Sa'ad al-Din Varavini
- Language: Persian
- Genre: Mirrors for princes
- Publication date: Early 13th-century

The Marzbān-nāma (Persian: مرزبان‌نامه, lit. 'Book of Marzban') is an early 13th-century Persian prose work. It consists of "various didactic stories and fables used as illustrations of morality and right conduct", and belongs to the "mirror for princes" literary genre. It was written in 1210–1225 by Sa'ad al-Din Varavini, under the patronage of Abu'l-Qasem Harun, the vizier of the Eldiguzid ruler (atabeg) Muzaffar al-Din Uzbek (r. 1210–1225).

The Marzbān-nāma was translated fully or as an abridgement into Turkish, Arabic, French and English. K. Crewe Williams notes that the Marzbān-nāma is said to have been based upon a non-extant precursor, which was written in the vernacular of Tabaristan (a historic region in northern Iran) around the 10th century, by the Bavandid ruler Al-Marzuban (r. 979–986).

As opposed to normal practice, the three illustrations found at the beginning of the earliest extant manuscript (dated 1299) were drawn before the text was written. The illustrations depict the Islamic prophet Muhammad, the author of the work and the patron.

== Manuscripts ==
Older extant manuscripts of the Marzbān-nāma include (per the Encyclopedia Iranica and the Grove Encyclopedia of Islamic Art & Architecture):

- Ms. 216 (Library of the Archaeological Museum, Istanbul), the only known manuscript with illustrations, dated 698/1299. It is the earliest known extant copy.
- OR 6476 (British Library, London, used in the collation of Qazvini), dated 8th/14th century, displays evidence of more than one copier.
- Ancien Fonds Persan 384 (Bibliothèque Nationale, Paris; also used in Qazvini’s collation), dated 9th/15th century.

== Sources ==
- Bloom, Jonathan M.; Blair, Sheila S., eds. (2009). "Illustration: Iraq and Iran, c. 1250–c. 1350". Grove Encyclopedia of Islamic Art & Architecture. Oxford University Press. ISBN 978-0195309911.
- Komaroff and Carboni, The Legacy of Genghis Khan: Courtly Art and Culture in Western Asia, 1256-1353. New York, The Metropolitan Museum, New Haven and London, Yale University Press, 2002, fig. 200.
- Williams, K. Crewe (2014). "MARZBĀN-NĀMA". In Yarshater, Ehsan (ed.). Encyclopædia Iranica (Online ed.). Encyclopædia Iranica Foundation.
