= Gıyaseddin Keyhüsrev =

Gıyaseddin Keyhüsrev was the name of three Anatolian Seljuk Sultans:

- Gıyaseddin Keyhüsrev I reigned during two different periods, the first time between 1192 and 1196, the second time between 1205 and 1211
- Gıyaseddin Keyhüsrev II reigned between 1237 and 1246
- Gıyaseddin Keyhüsrev III reigned between 1265 and 1282
