= İnce Minareli Medrese =

13th-century madrasa (and now museum) in Konya, Turkey

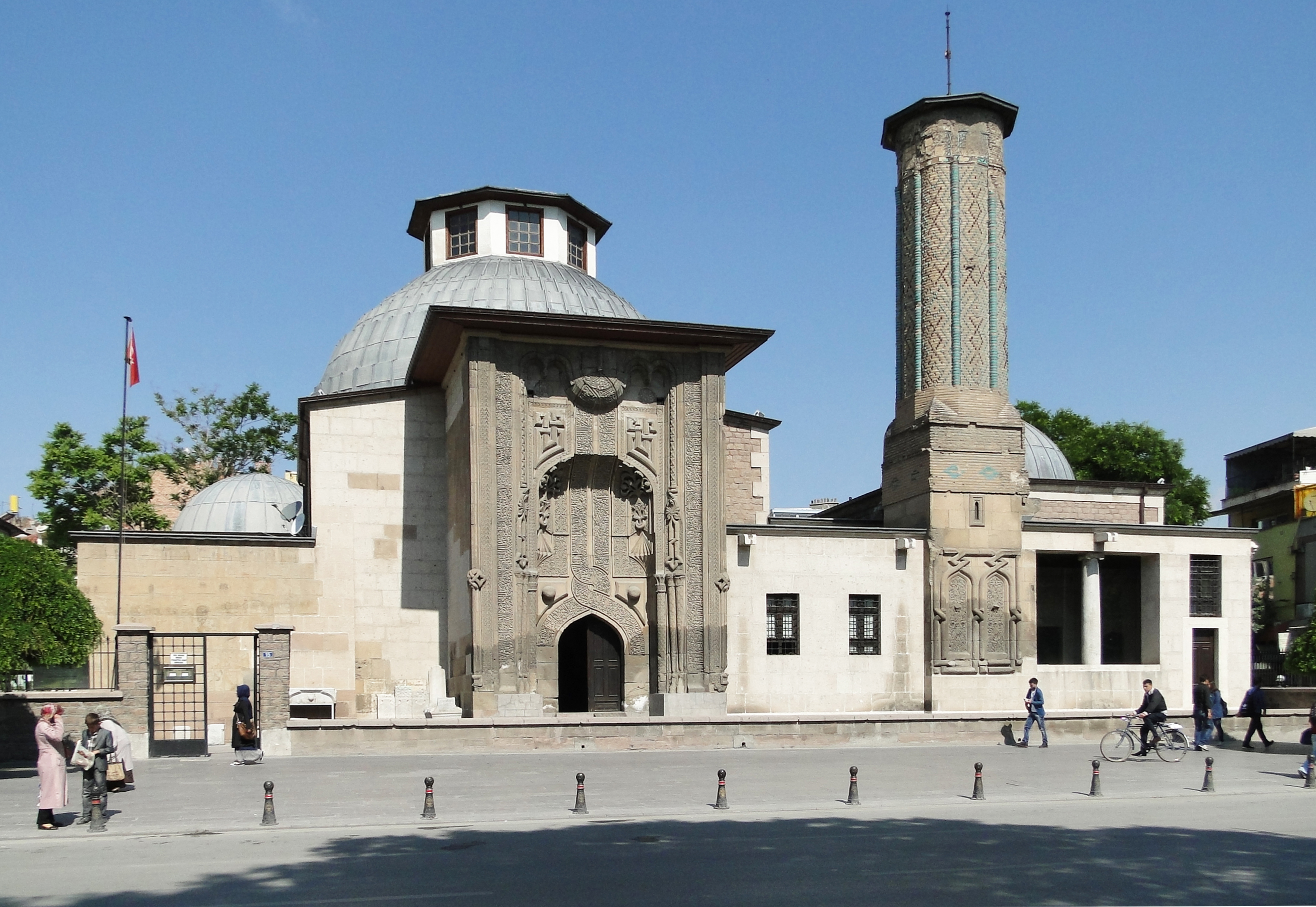

- Location in Turkey

Religion
- Affiliation: Islam
- District: Konya
- Province: Konya
- Region: Central Anatolia

Location
- Location: Konya, Turkey
- Coordinates: 37.872889°N 32.489982°E

Architecture
- Type: Madrasa
- Style: Seljuk
- Completed: 1279
- Minaret: 1

İnce Minareli Medrese (lit. 'Slender Minaret Madrasa') is a 13th-century madrasa (Islamic school) located in Konya, Turkey, now housing the Museum of Stone and Wood Art (Taş ve Ahşap Eserler Müzesi), noted for its ornate entrance, domed courtyard, ornamentally bricked minaret, partially destroyed in 1901, and exemplar Anatolian Seljuk architecture.

== History ==
The İnce Minareli Medrese was commissioned in 1265 by the Seljuk vizier Ṣāḥib 'Aṭā Fakhr al-Dīn 'Alī, who was one of was one of two major patrons of architecture in Konya in the decades after the city's recapture from the Mongols. Upon his death in 1285, he was buried in his "mosque complex" within the city.

== Architecture ==
=== Complex Layout ===
The İnce Minareli Medrese is built close to the old center of Seljuk rule, at the foot of the citadel hill in Konya. The complex of the medrese is approximately 23.60 meters by 20.30 meters, or about 77.4 feet by 66.6 feet. In the center of the rectangular complex is a dome-covered courtyard which is surrounded by the rooms of the medrese, or Islamic religious school, on the north, south and west sides. The student rooms are located on the north and south sides of the centrally-placed dome and the medrese's classrooms are located on the west side. On the east side of the courtyard is a single-domed mosque with the minaret with two balconies, or şerefes in Turkish, on the south-eastern corner. The courtyard includes a single iwan facing the entrance, or a courtyard space with barrel-vaulted halls and rectangular and square side chambers, which emulates an ancient Persian rectangular space layout that became a standard type during the era of Seljuk Anatolia.

Typical of medieval Islamic architecture, the integration of the mosque into the medrese's architectural plan is evidence of the complex's multitude of purposes as a religious place of worship and of teaching. The exterior of the complex is made of cut stone, the outer side walls are made of rubble and stone, and the interior uses brick for structural and ornamental purposes. The use of brick decoration was a common feature of Seljuk buildings due to its connections to traditional Anatolian brick architecture.

=== Portal and Facade ===
The portal of the building is surrounded by highly ornamented stonework which stretches up the entire facade. While other contemporary Seljuk constructions made use of muqarnas hoods above the entry, the İnce Minareli Medrese instead includes large stone banners of text. Sura 36 and Sura 110 are inscribed in prominent vertical bands of thuluth calligraphy that intertwine and separate just above the doorway. Geometric and vegetal designs likewise adorn the facade, taking the form of knots, branches, and leaves. Apart from displaying the stonework and script, the facade also conceals the layout of the interior spaces behind it. Within two rosettes framing the portal are inscriptions attesting to the building's architect, Kölük bin Abdullah, who also designed the Gök Medrese in Sivas as well as the nearby Sahip Ata Complex in Konya. Abdullah is hypothesized to have worked on a number of Ṣāḥib 'Aṭā Fakhr al-Dīn's commissions.

=== Dome ===
At the center of the courtyard is the centrally-planned, covered dome. Although central plans were common in late Seljuk architecture, the İnce Minareli Medrese diverged from previous centrally-planned courtyards with the addition of the covered dome space. The large central dome emulates pre-Seljuk Anatolian architecture, specifically earlier mosque plans and the standard Anatolian Byzantine church style.

The dome itself receives light by means of a lantern, which illuminates the covered courtyard space. It is supported by four triangular fan pendentives made of exposed brickwork. The side chambers of the dome are not decorated at all, which increases the striking aesthetic properties of the central space. The interior of the dome is covered in alternating turquoise and black tiles in geometric patterns that bear an inscription in kufic script.

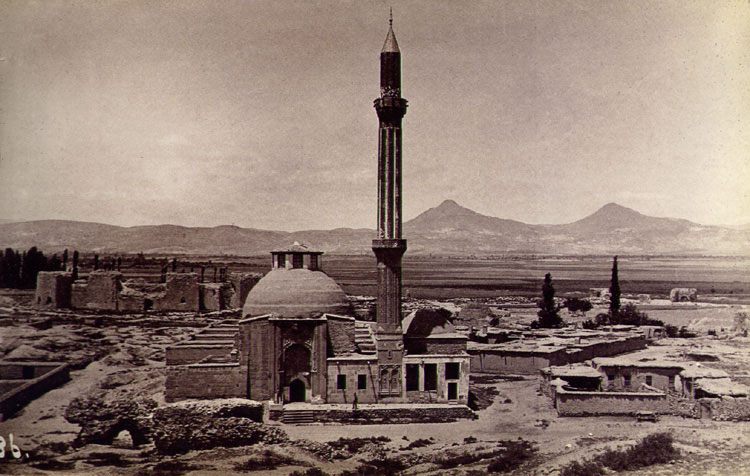
A view of the İnce Minareli Medrese from the citadel of Konya in 1884 (image from a photo collection originally published in 1901).

=== Minaret ===
The İnce Minareli Medrese's name refers to the structure's original extremely tall minaret, which once possessed two balconies. In 1901, however, the minaret was partially destroyed by a lightning strike. The lightning strike caused the minaret to fall on the complex's mosque, which destroyed its dome and resulted in subsequent repairs using concrete and glass. The minaret is located near the gateway of the dome. The base of the minaret is square shaped and built out of brick. As the base goes upward, the square shape gives way to a cylindrical form. Glazed bricks are strategically placed a slight distance apart in a cylindrical geometric pattern, generating an illusion of free-hanging materials. In addition, green tiles as well as geometric motifs decorate the outer portion of the minaret, creating a distinct Seljuk style of architecture and artwork. It was common practice for Seljuk buildings to be lined in glazed brick and ornamented with a decorative style.

== Gallery ==
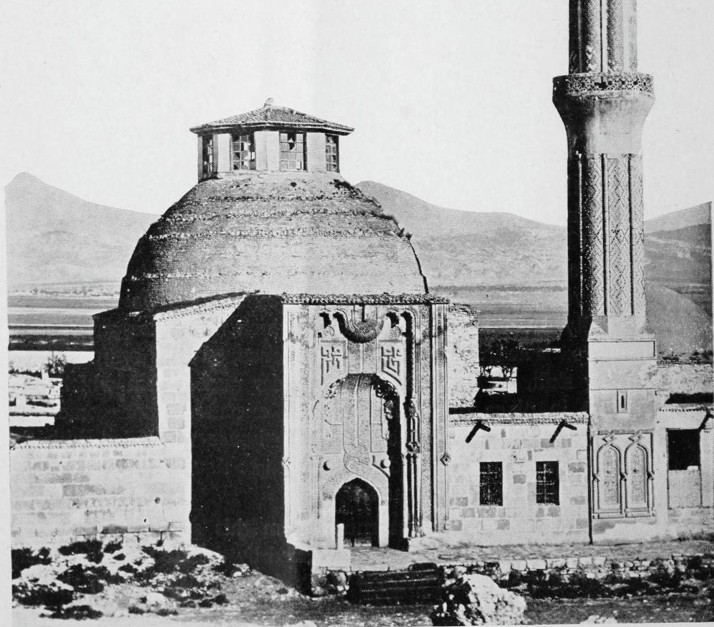
Old historical photo of İnce Minareli Medrese

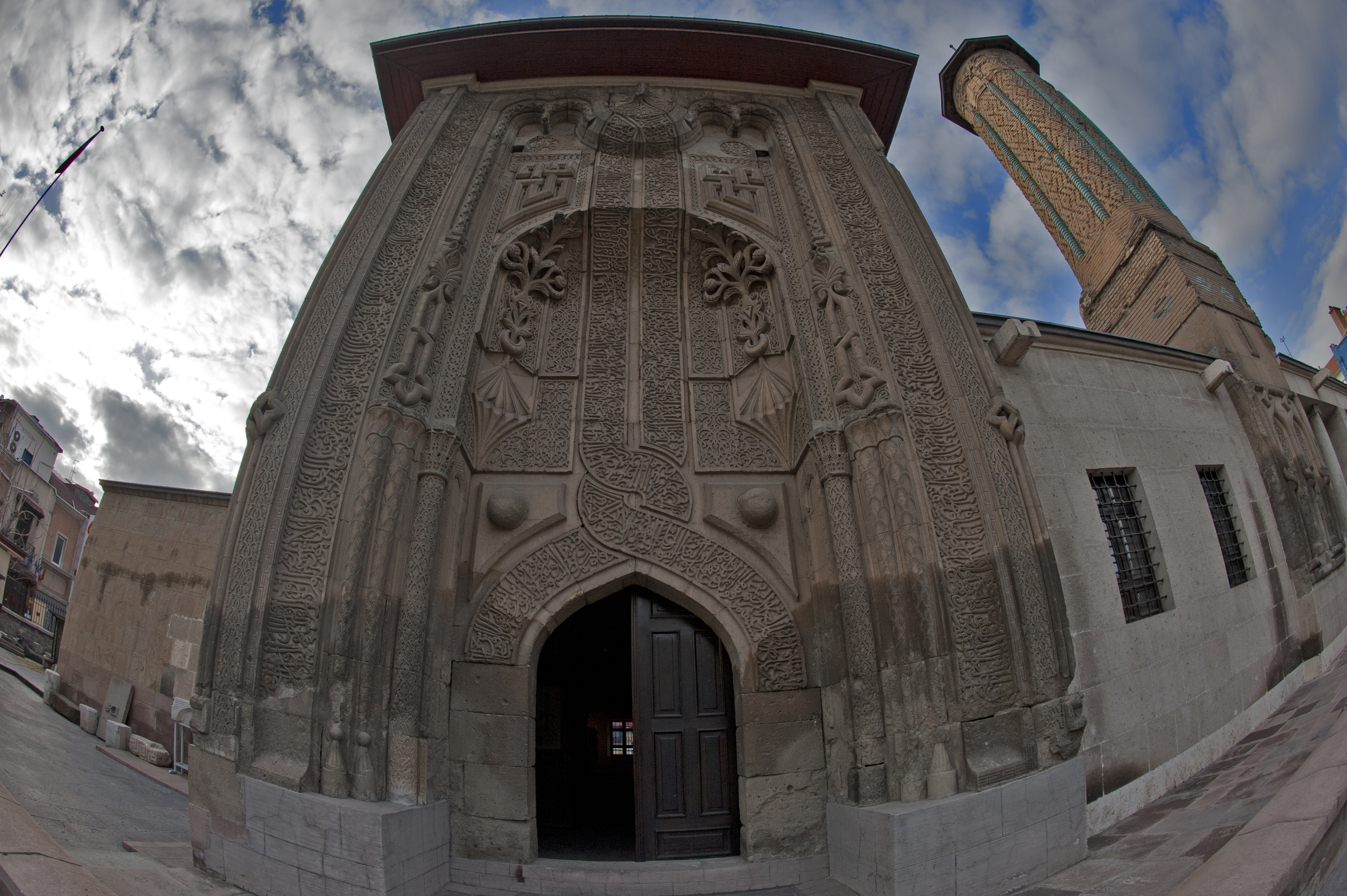
İnce Minareli Medrese Museum, exterior

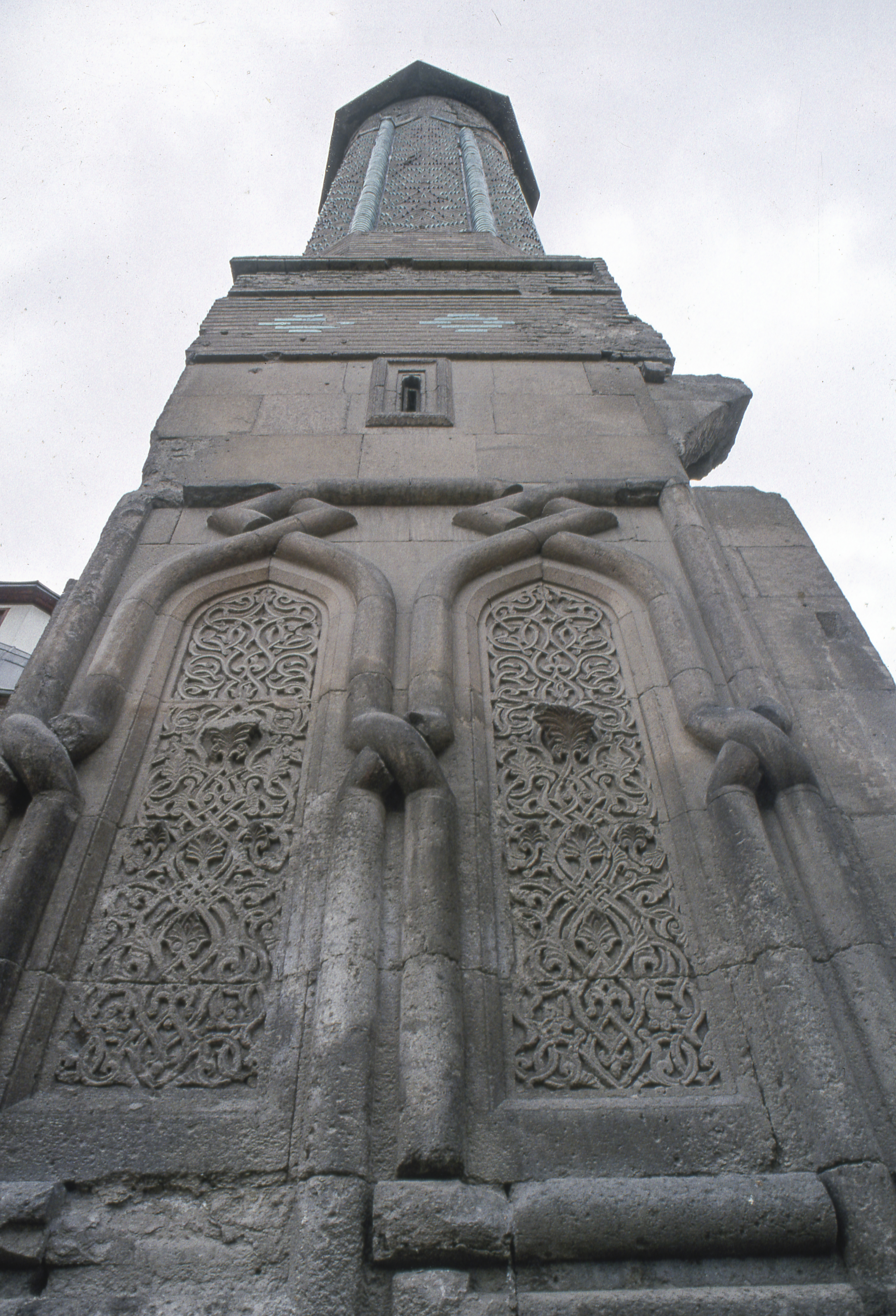
İnce Minareli Medrese Museum, exterior

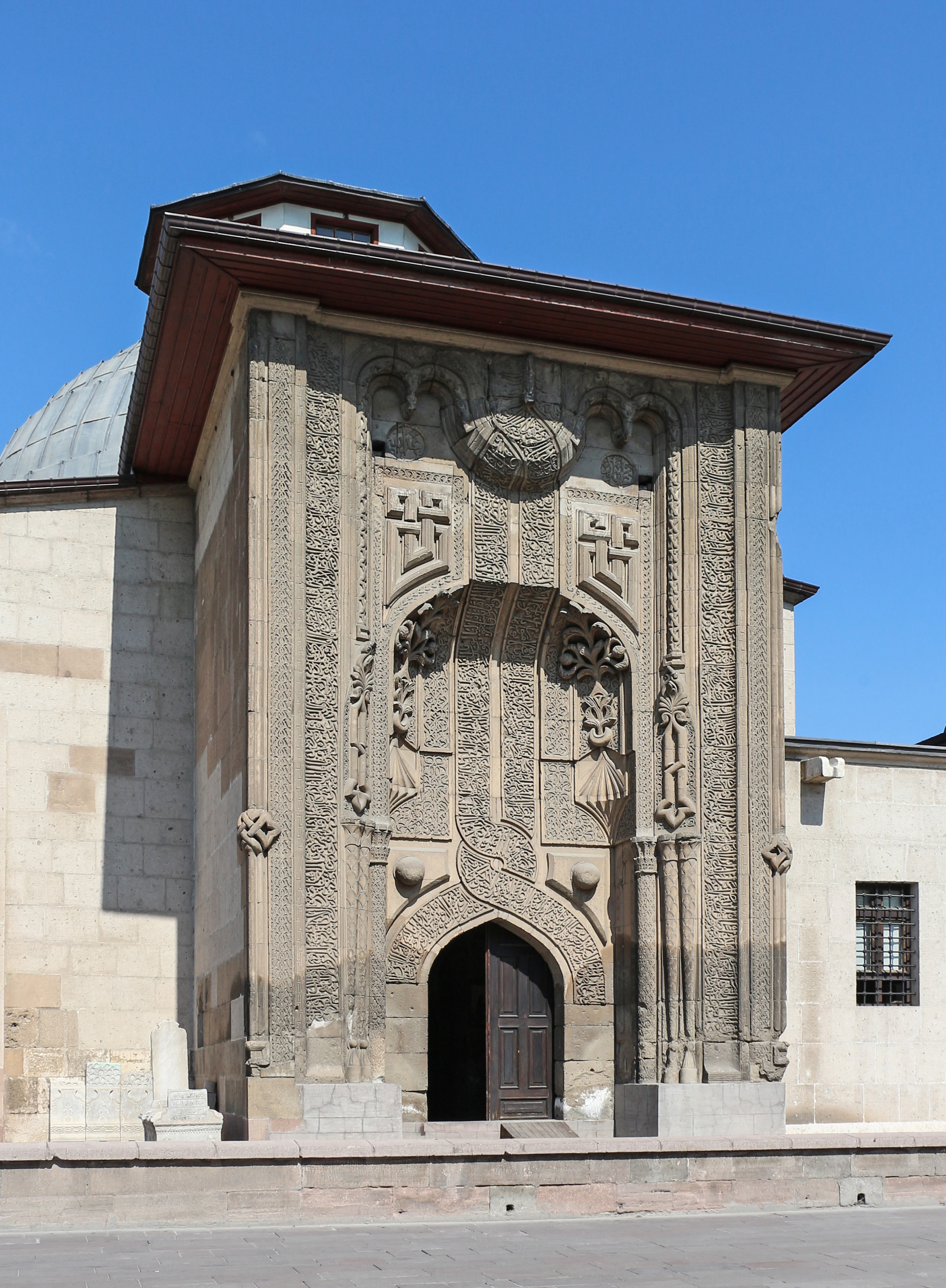
Detail of the facade

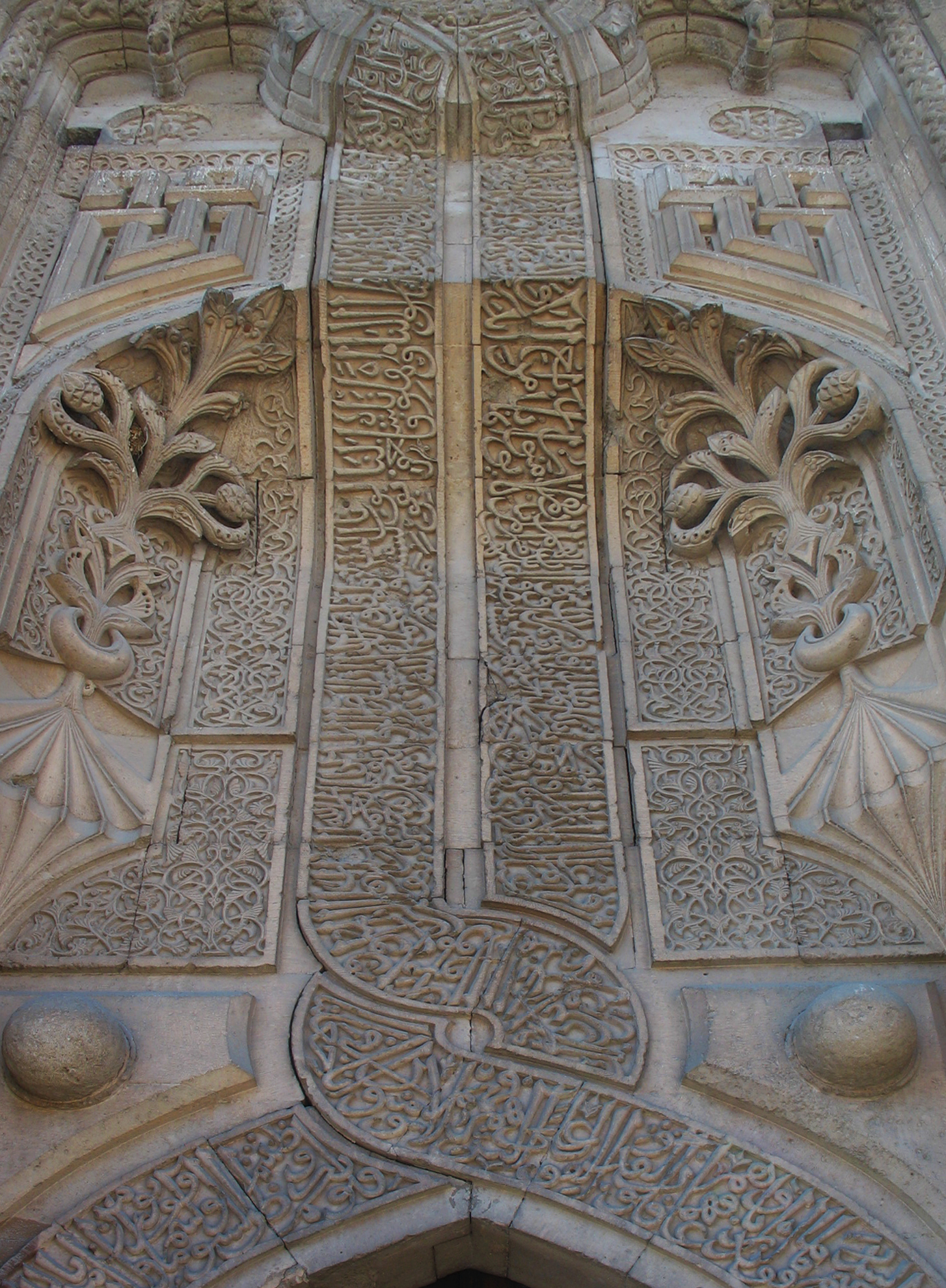
The highly ornamented stone facade of the entrance of the İnce Minareli Medrese

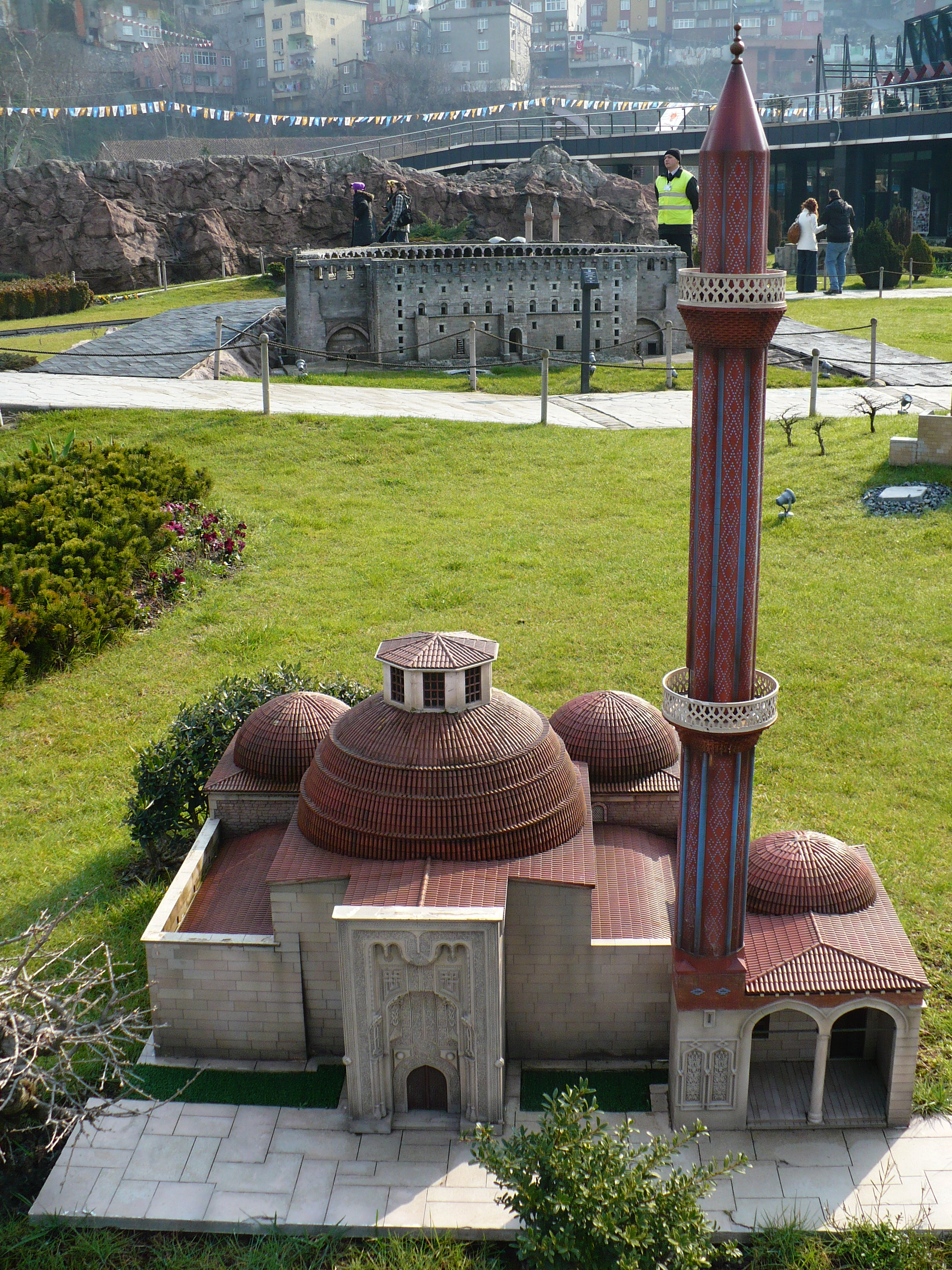
Model of the İnce Minareli Medrese, showing the original height of its minaret

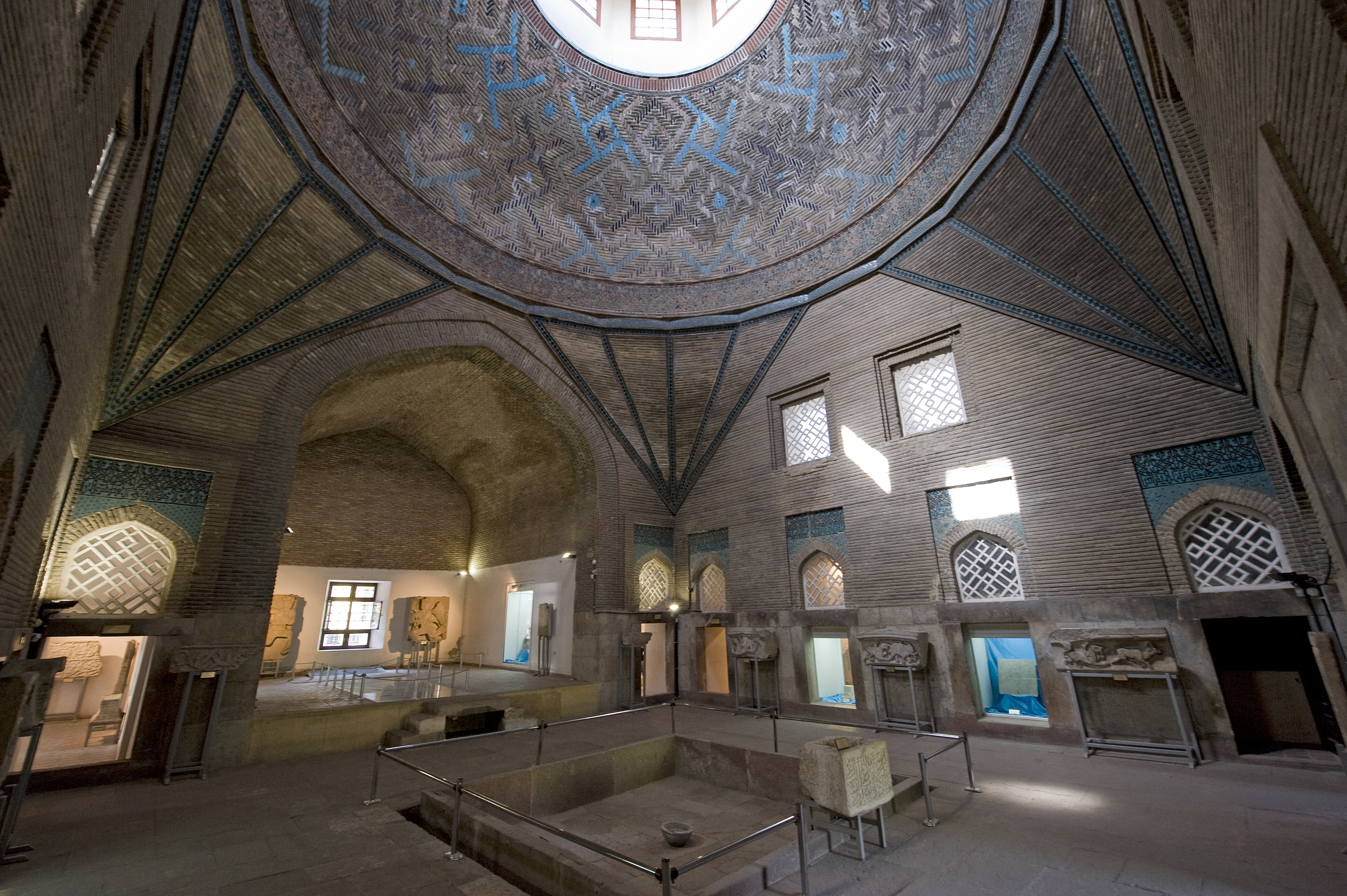
İnce Minareli Medrese Museum, central room

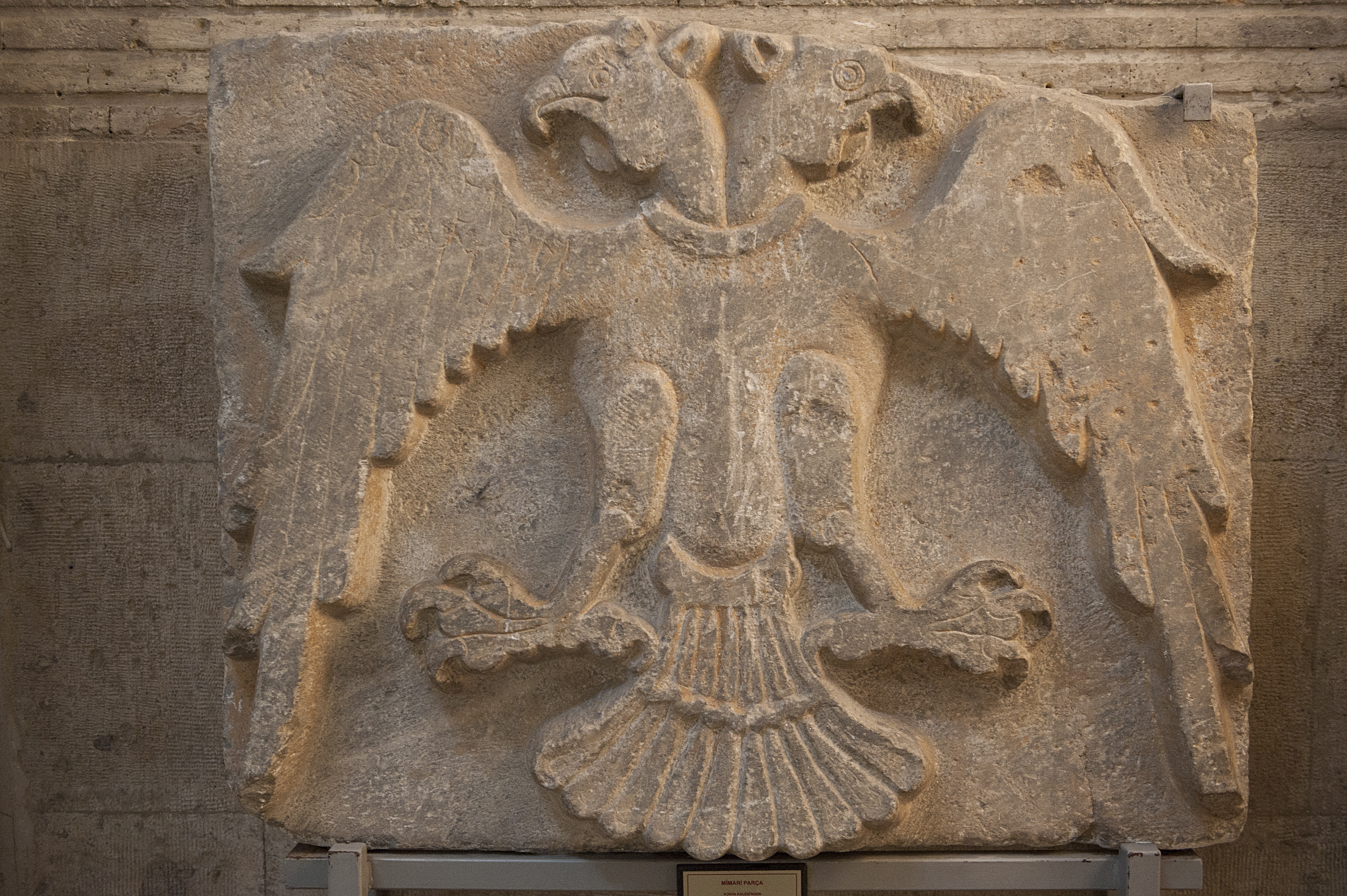
İnce Minareli Medrese Museum, double headed Anatolian Seljuk eagle

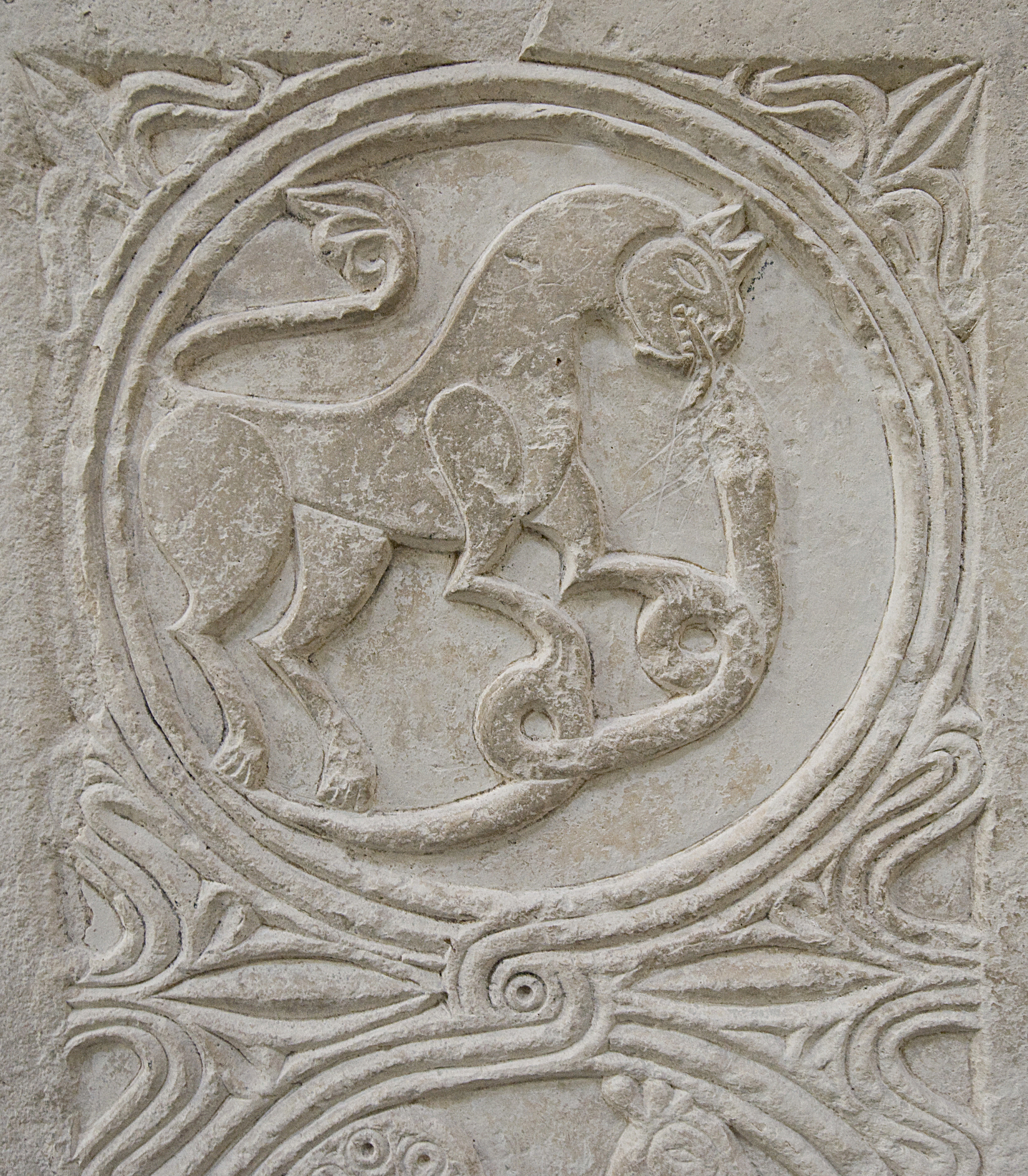
İnce Minareli Medrese Museum, imaginary animal relief

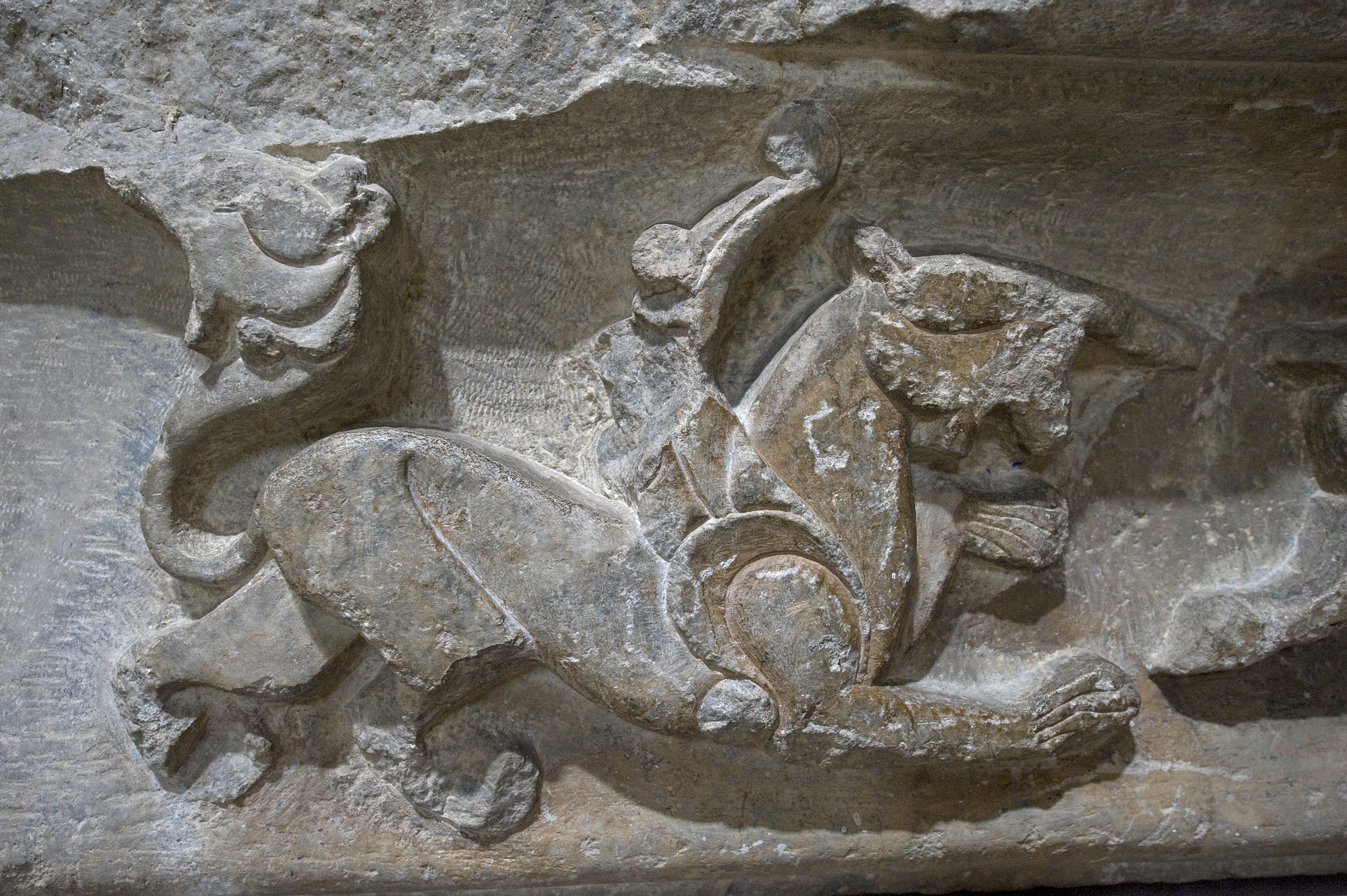
İnce Minareli Medrese Museum, Seljuk architectural fragment

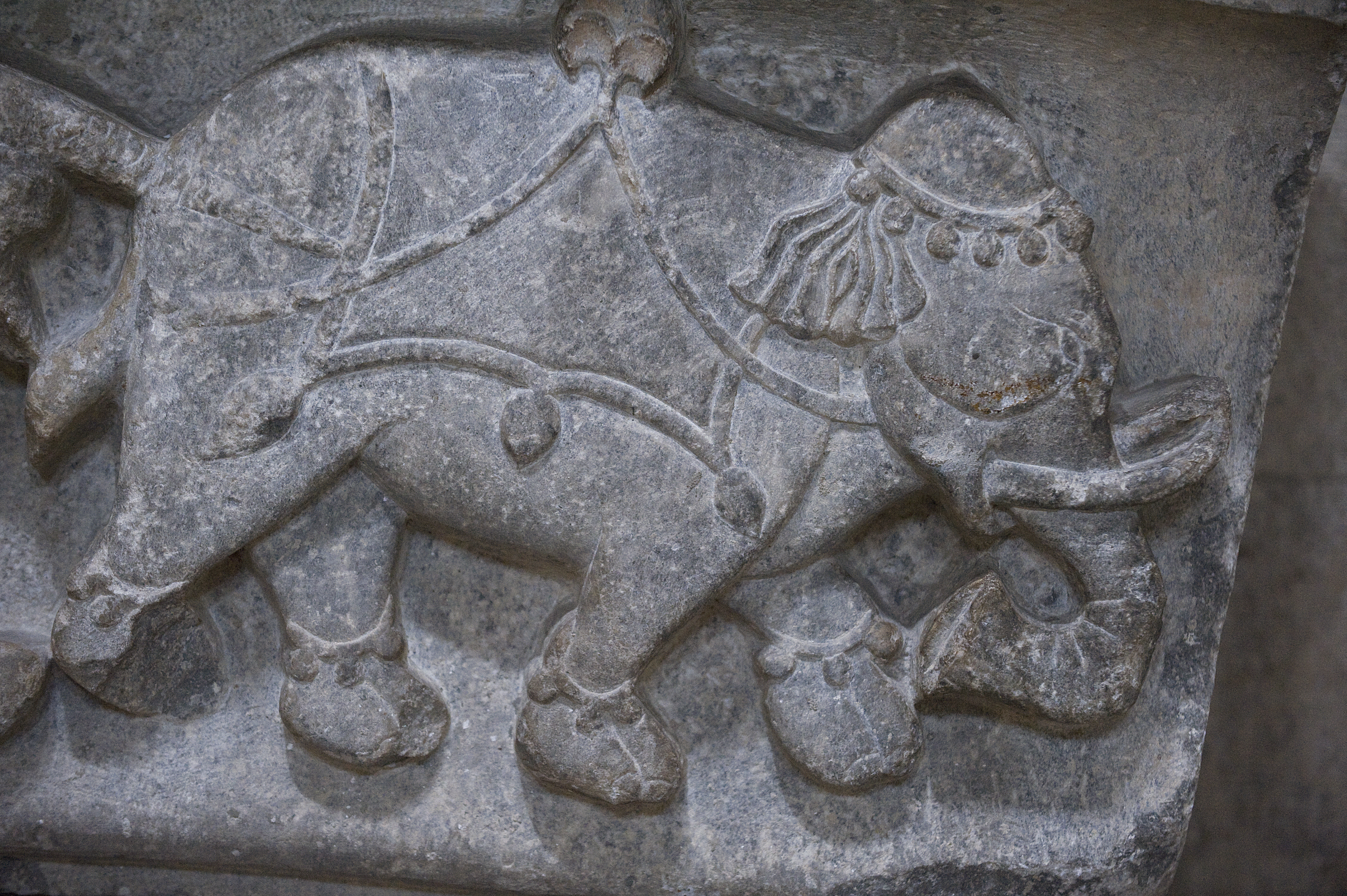
İnce Minareli Medrese Museum, Seljuk architectural fragment

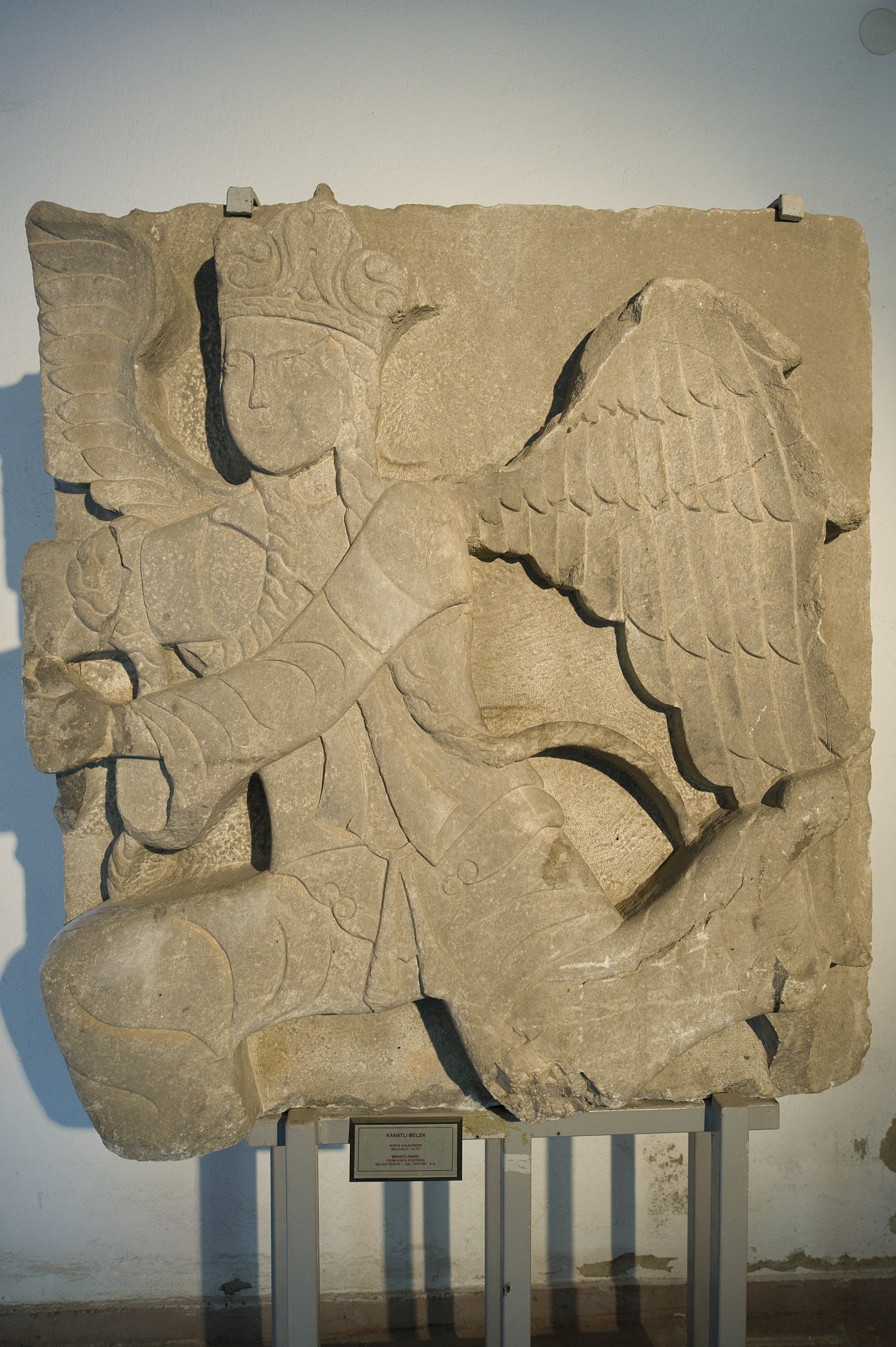
İnce Minareli Medrese Museum, Seljuk winged angel

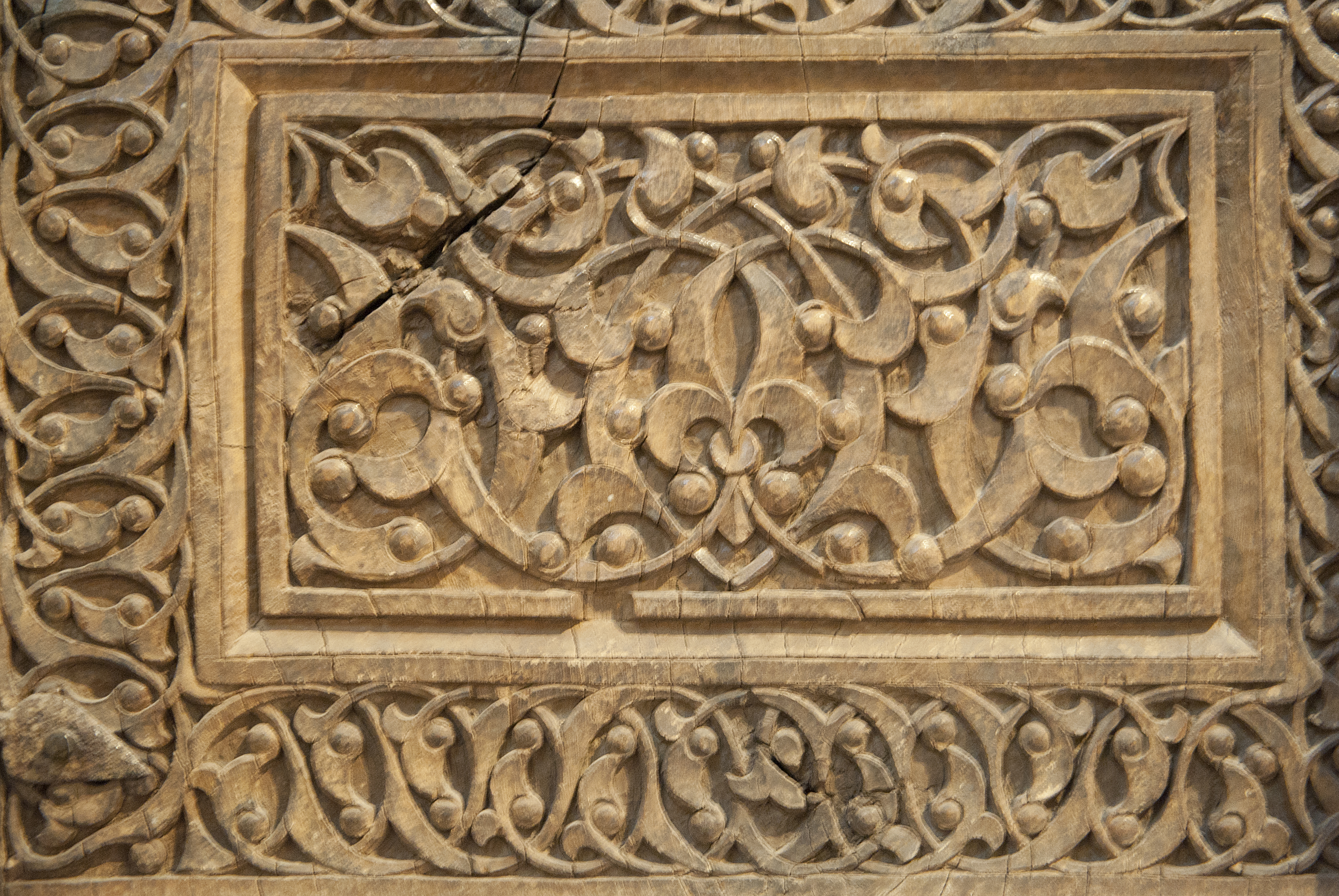
İnce Minareli Medrese Museum, Beykim Mescit detail

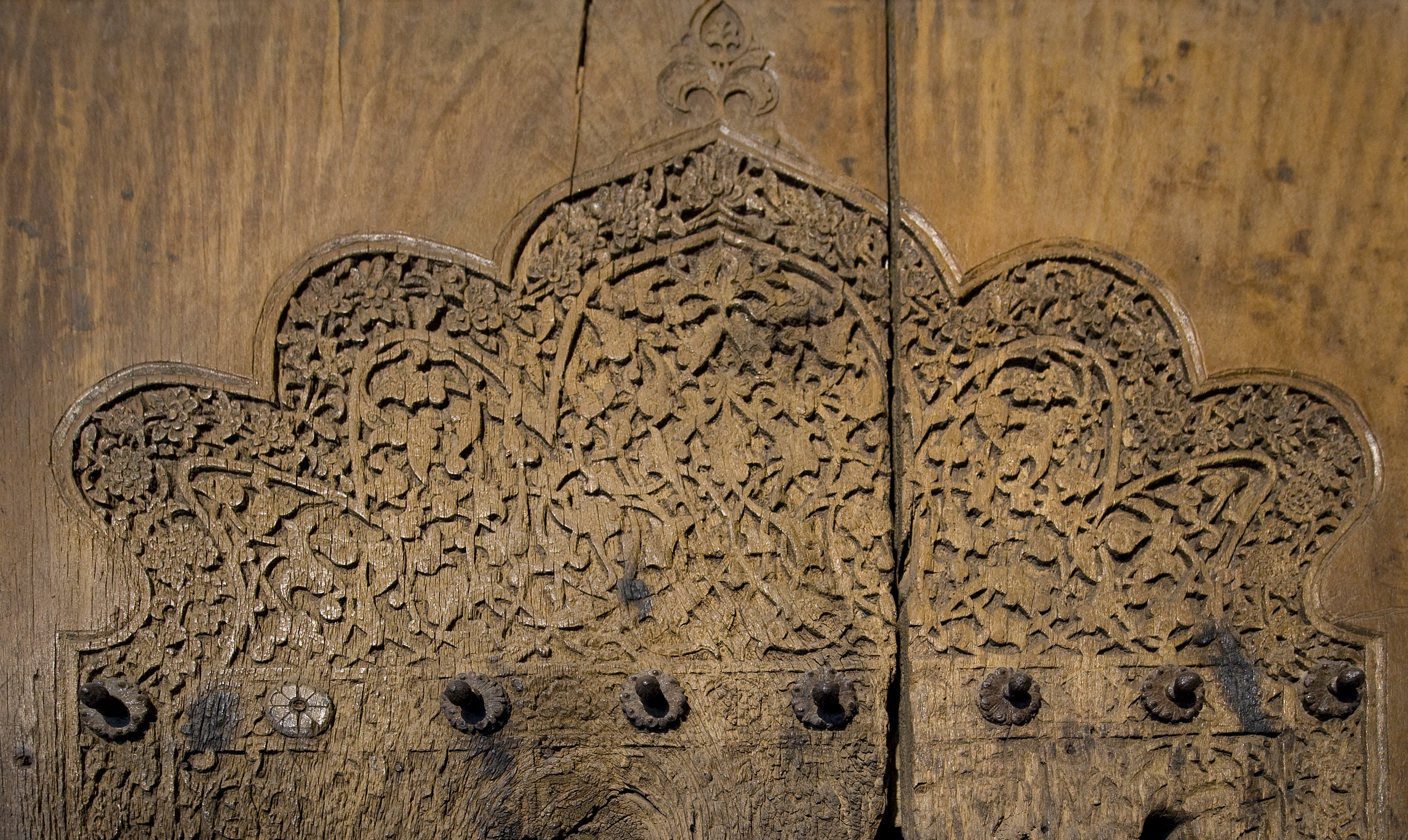
İnce Minareli Medrese Museum, Hasbey Dar'ül Huffazı door

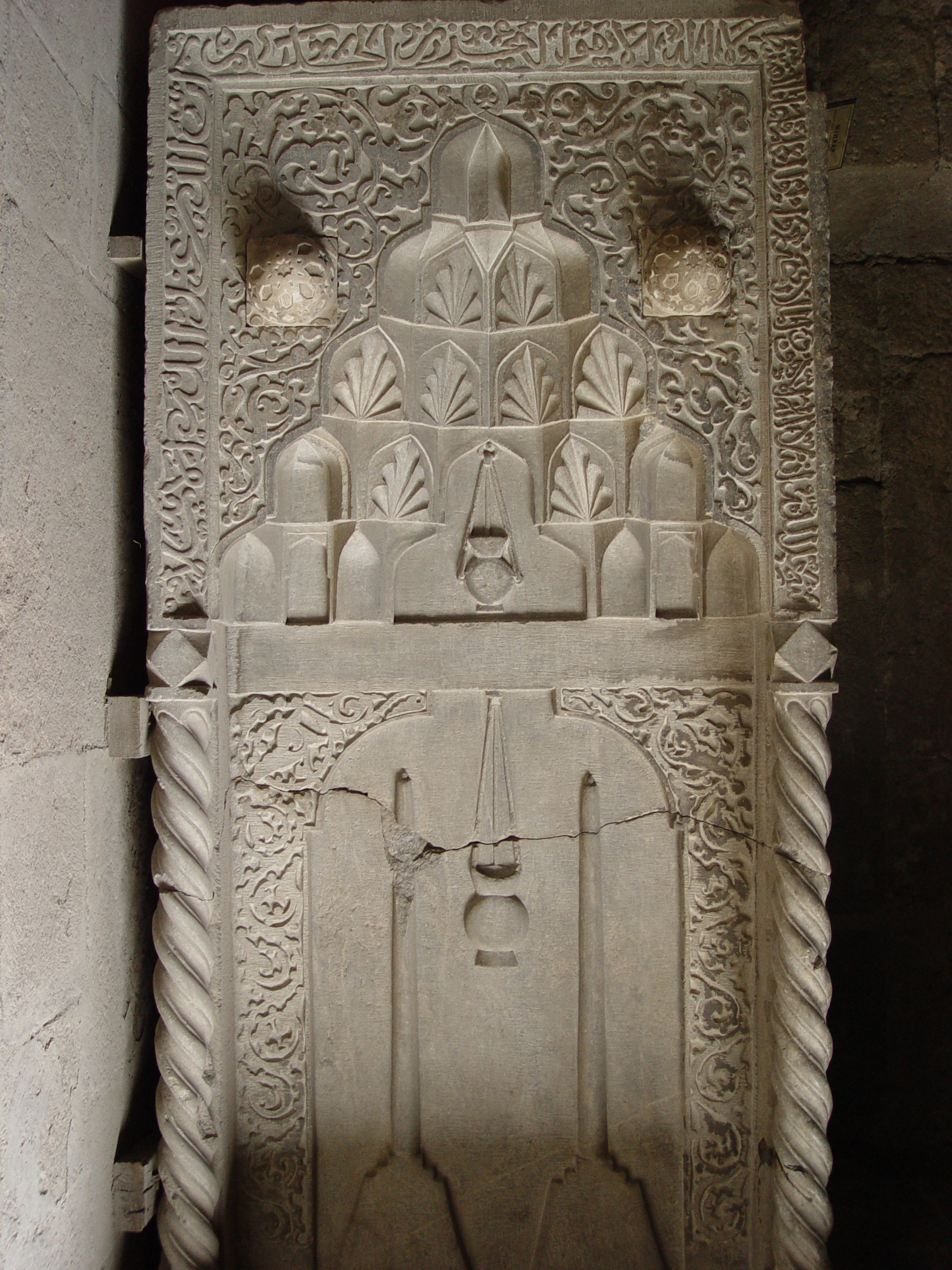
İnce Minareli Medrese Museum, mihrab of Ulri Sultan Mescit

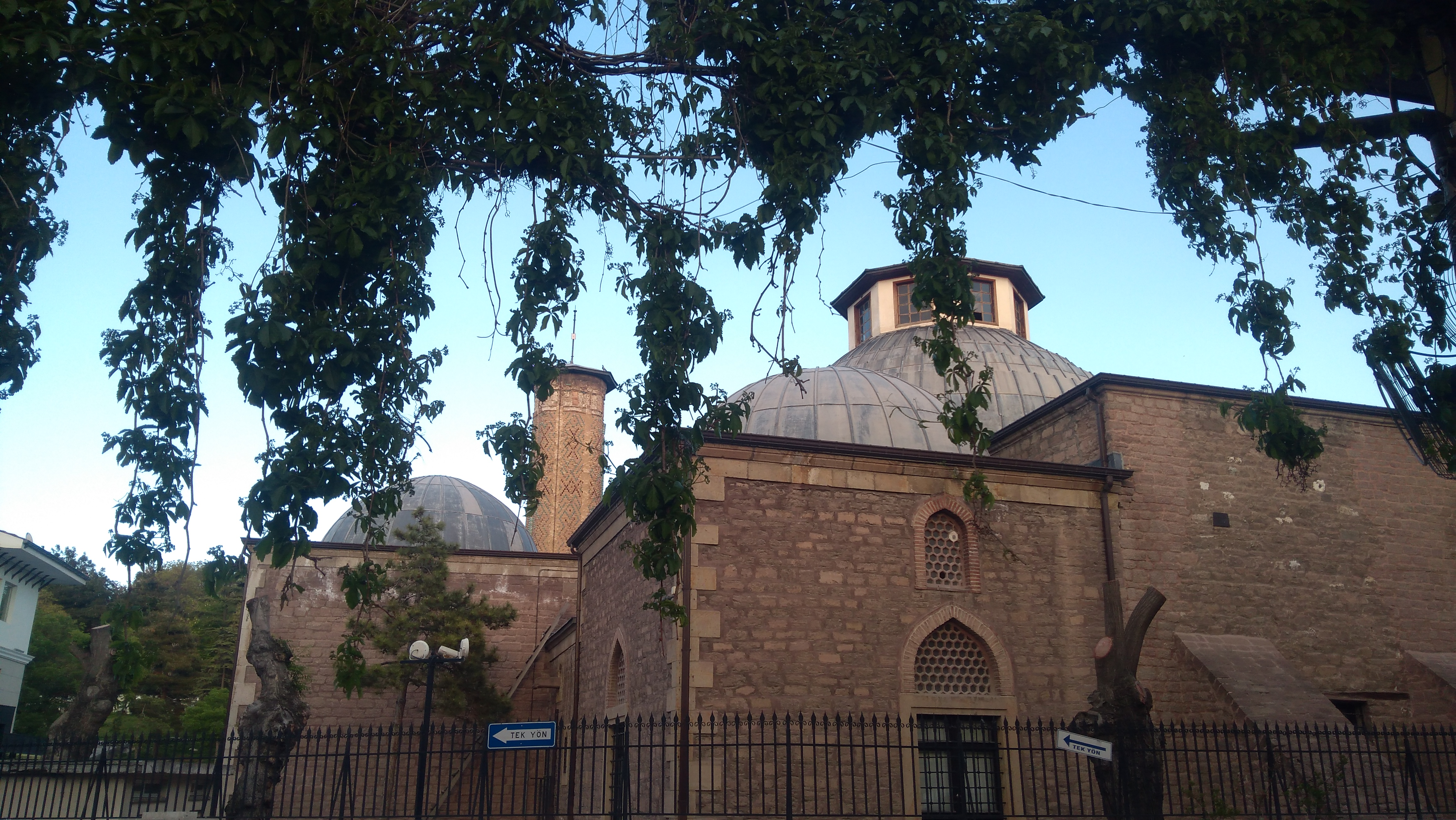
İnce Minareli Medrese Museum, view from the backyard
