= Mehmed I of Karaman =

Beg of Karaman from 1263 to 1277/9

Mehmed
- شمس الدین
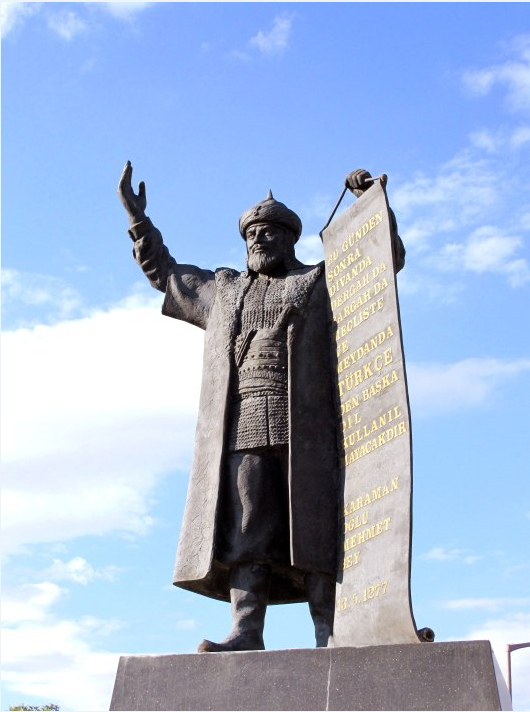

Beg of Karāmān
- Reign: 1261–1277
- Predecessor: Karim al-Din Karaman
- Successor: Güneri
- Born: 1246
- Died: 20 June 1277 or 30 May 1279 (aged 30/31); Mut, Beylik of Karaman
- House: Karamanid
- Father: Karim al-Din Karaman
- Mother: Daughter of Kaykhusraw II
- Religion: Sunni Islam

Mehmed I, Shams al-Din Mehmed Bey (Old Anatolian Turkish: محمد اول) or commonly known as Karamanoğlu Mehmed Bey (b. 1245 - 1246, Ermenek - d. June 20, 1277,1278 or 30 May 1279, Mut, Mersin). He was the eldest son of Karaman Bey and the third ruler of the Karamanids. He is known for initiating a rebellion against the Mongol-Seljuk rule and declaring Turkish as the official language in Anatolia on May 13, 1277. Karamanoğlu Mehmetbey University in Karaman was named after him.

== Early life ==
Meḥmed was the eldest son of Karim al-Dīn Ḳarāmān, the soubashi of the region around Ermenek, Mut, Silifke, Gülnar, and Anamur. Upon Ḳarāmān's death in 1263, Sultan of Rum Kilij Arslan IV arrested his children and brother, emir-i jandar Bunsuz. When Kilij Arslan died in 1266 and Muʿīn al-Dīn Parwāna assumed full power, the latter released Ḳarāmān's children, except for ʿAlī, who was kept in Kayseri.

== Joining the Rebellion ==
Meḥmed and his brothers joined Hatīroghlu Sharaf al-Dīn's revolt against the Mongols. Sharaf al-Dīn granted Mehmed the lands his father formerly ruled over and dismissed Badr al-Dīn Ibrāhīm from that position. Meḥmed further expanded his territory towards the Mediterranean coast and eliminated the Mongol force of 200 men in Ulukışla.

=== Battle of Göksu ===
The former subaşı of Kamerüddin-ili, Bedreddin Ibrahim (known as Khotanli Qadi-oghlu Bedr al-Din Ibrahim), launched a military campaign against Mehmed Bey out of revenge. In addition to his own forces, he was reinforced by a Mongol unit of 2,000 men commanded by Toku and Tadavun Noyan. Although Karamanoğlu Mehmed Bey initially offered to pay 100,000 dinars to the royal treasury, Bedreddin Ibrahim refused to turn back. In response, the Karamanids retreated into the mountainous regions and began to wear down the advancing Seljuk-Mongol army, inflicting heavy casualties.

The two forces finally met at the Göksu Pass, where the Karamanids inflicted a decisive defeat on the Seljuk-Mongol forces. The Karamanids captured substantial spoils and numerous prisoners. Bedreddin Ibrahim managed to save his life by taking refuge in a nearby fortress, which was subsequently placed under siege by the Karamanids.

== Vizierate of the Seljuks ==
=== Capture of Konya and enthronement of Siyavush ===
Mehmed Bey openly opposed the Seljuk Sultan Kaykhusraw III, who was ruling under Mongol suzerainty. Consequently, accompanied by Ala al-Din Siyavush (commonly known as Jimri), who claimed to be the son of the former Seljuk Sultan Kaykaus II, Mehmed Bey marched upon and besieged the Seljuk capital of Konya. At the time, only the regent of the realm, Emin al-Din Mikail, and Baha al-Din|Melik al-Sawahil Baha al-Din Bey were present in the capital to command its defense.

During the siege, Karamanoğlu Mehmed Bey sent an envoy to Emin al-Din Mika'il, declaring that he was accompanied by the rightful son of Sultan Kaykaus II, that trustworthy figures had authenticated his lineage, and that the defenders could send former royal tutors to verify his identity. However, his demand was rejected. In response, Mehmed Bey and his Turkmen troops launched a direct assault on Konya. Although the Seljuk forces within the city attempted to resist, they failed to offer substantial defense. The Turkmen forces set fire to the Atpazari and Chashnigir gates of the city, successfully breaching the defenses and entering Konya on 12 May 1277. While attempting to flee, Emin al-Din Mika'il was captured by the Karamanids, forced to reveal the locations of the royal treasury, and subsequently executed alongside Melik al-Sawahil Baha al-Din. Following the execution of the regent Emin al-Din Mikail, the citizens of Konya were pressured to recognize the reign of Siyavush, to which they eventually agreed. On 15 May 1277, Ala al-Din Siyavush was mounted on a horse, paraded around the city, and enthroned in a grand ceremony. Coins were minted and the khutbah was read in his name. Karamanoğlu Mehmed Bey assumed the position of vizier, and a royal council (divan) was convened following the ceremony.

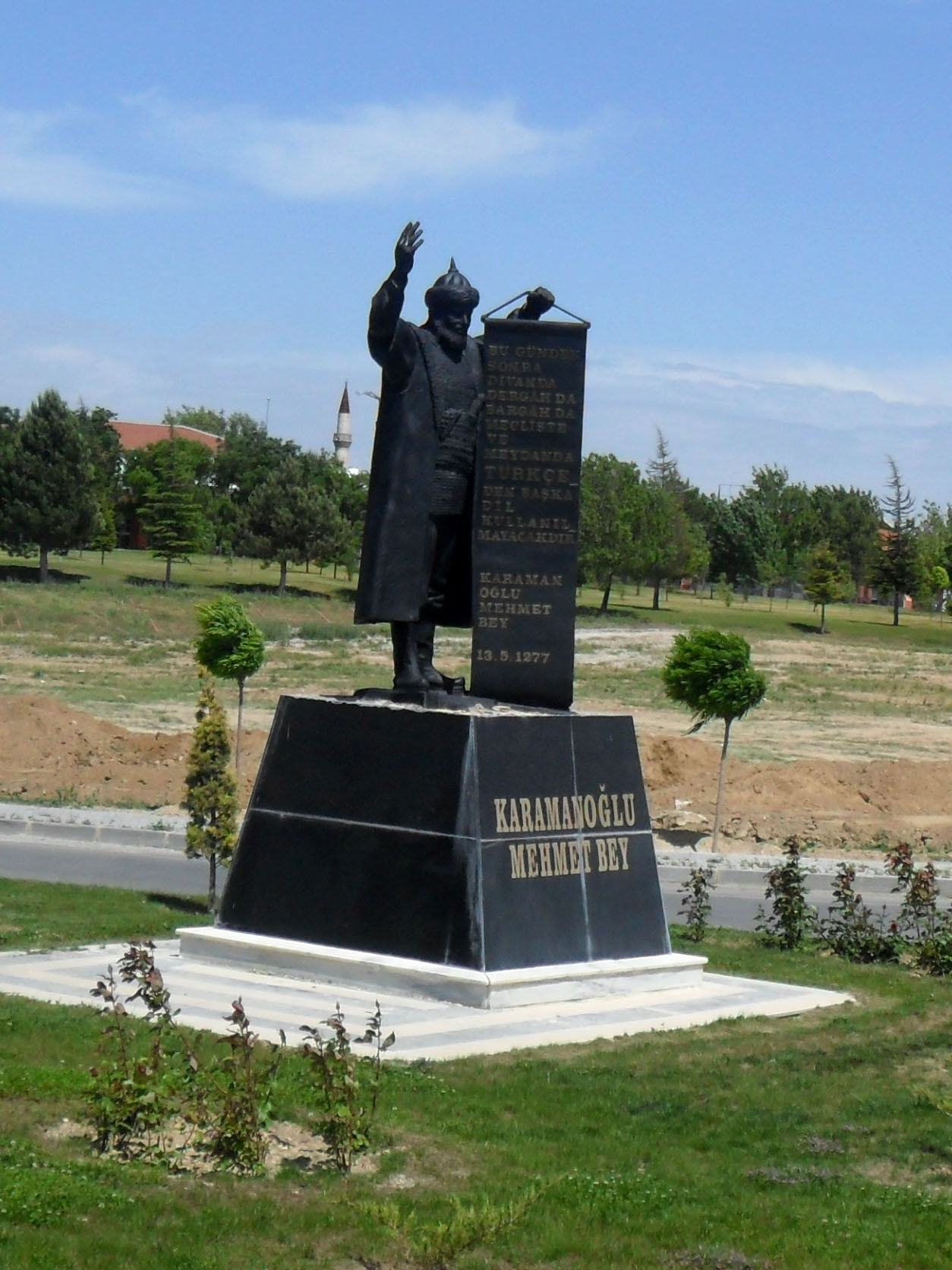
The statue of Mehmed I in Karaman

During this council, Mehmed Bey issued a famous edict declaring Turkish as the official language of administration and public life, replacing Persian and Arabic, which had previously been used in the palace and official correspondence. Furthermore, the use of any language other than Turkish was prohibited in all public spaces across the Seljuk realm. Following these political arrangements, Karamanoğlu Mehmed Bey was reappointed to the governorship of Kamerüddin-ili.

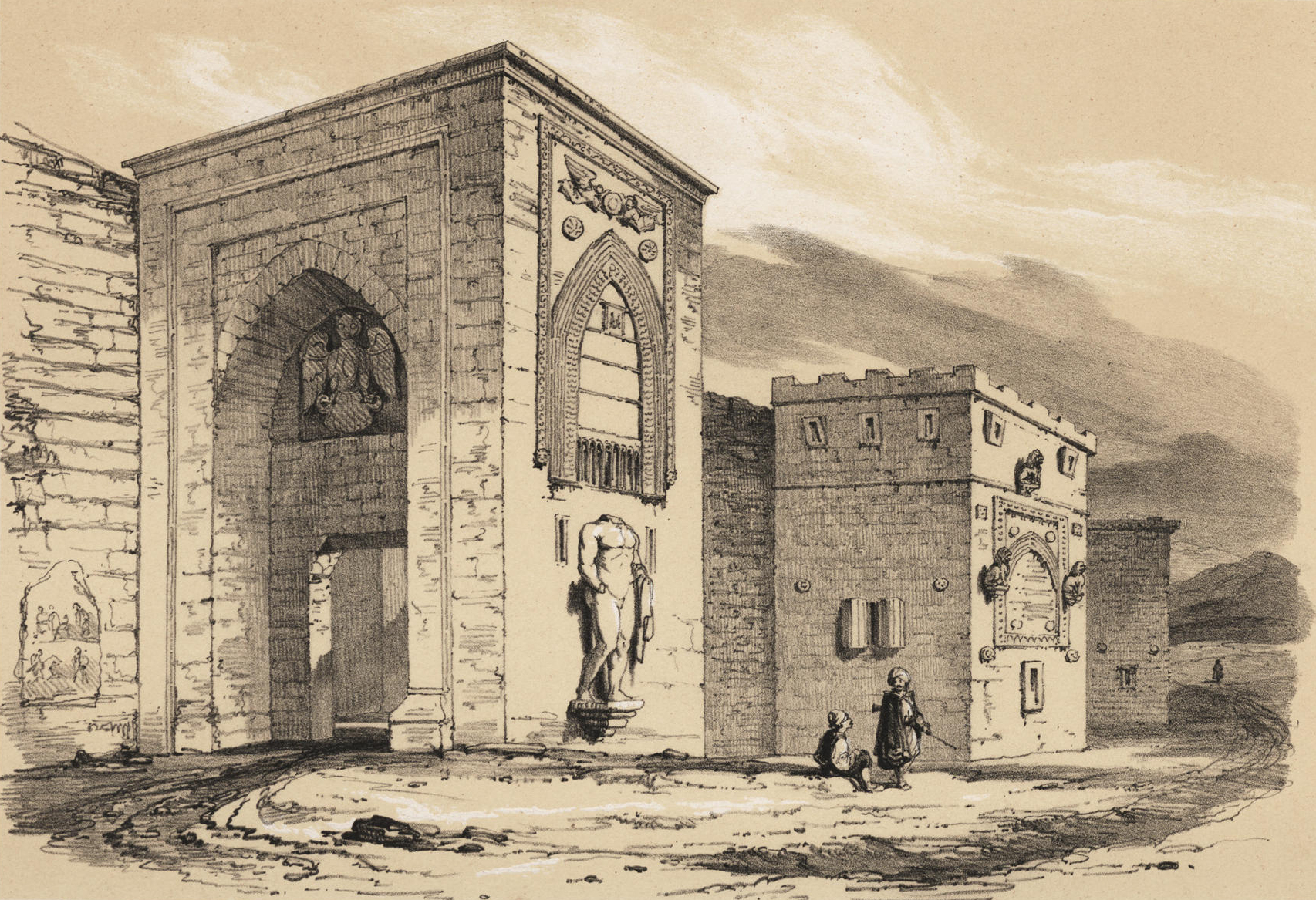
City walls of Konya

=== Battle of Değirmençayı ===
Upon learning of the execution of Emin al-Din Mikail and Melik al-Sawahil Baha al-Din, as well as the enthronement of Ala al-Din Siyavush by Karamanoğlu Mehmed Bey, the sons of Sahib Ata Fahreddin, Taceddin Hüseyin and Nusreddin Hasan, gathered a large army by distributing fifty thousand dirhams to the Germiyanid Turkmens and marched against Mehmed Bey and Siyavush. While celebrations were still ongoing in Konya, news arrived that Sahib Ata's sons were advancing toward the city, prompting Mehmed Bey to march out of Konya to engage them.

The two forces eventually met at the Değirmençayı locality near Akşehir, separated by a stream flowing between them. Mehmed Bey initially attempted to ride his horse into the stream, but one of his Turkmen soldiers held his reins, advising him to wait and observe. Confident in his forces, Taceddin Hüseyin took his spear in hand and charged into the stream. Mehmed Bey also rode into the stream to confront him, resulting in a duel in which Taceddin Hüseyin fell into the water. The Turkmen forces then decapitated him on the spot. Seeing Taceddin's death, the Germiyanid Turkmens and their allies panicked and fled the battlefield, resulting in a decisive victory for Mehmed Bey, who captured substantial spoils. Following this victory, Mehmed Bey besieged Afyonkarahisar; however, when the siege proved unsuccessful, he returned to Konya alongside Ala al-Din Siyavush.

== Late years and Death ==
However, his overall tenure in Konya lasted for 37 days. Hearing news of the approaching Mongol Empire, Mehmed and Jimri left Konya. Sahib Ata pursued them along with the Mongol army. Mehmed sent Jimri away from the region and traveled to the vicinity of Mut to observe the Mongol army. There, the Mongols set an ambush, leading to a clash in which Mehmed lost his life alongside two of his brothers and a cousin. Their severed heads were brought to Konya. He was succeeded by his brother Güneri.

== Firman ==
Mehmet is known as a devotee of the Turkish language. During his brief term as a vizier, he issued a firman dated 13 May 1277:

Şimden girü hiç kimesne kapuda ve divanda ve mecalis ve seyranda Türki dilinden gayri dil söylemeye.

From now on nobody in the palace, in the divan, council and on walks speak no language other than Turkish.

== Legacy ==
Karamanoğlu Mehmetbey University in Karaman is named after him.

== See also ==
- Firman of Karamanoğlu Mehmet Bey

== Bibliography ==
- Sümer, Faruk (1978). "Ḳarāmān-Og̲h̲ullari̊". In van Donzel, E.; Lewis, B.; Pellat, Ch. & Bosworth, C. E. (eds.). The Encyclopaedia of Islam, Second Edition. Volume IV: Iran–Kha. Leiden: E. J. Brill. ISBN 978-90-04-05745-6. OCLC 758278456.
- Sümer, Faruk (2003). "Mehmed Bey, Karamanoğlu". TDV Encyclopedia of Islam, Vol. 28 (Mani̇sa Mevlevîhânesi̇ – Meks) (in Turkish). Istanbul: Presidency of Religious Affairs, Centre for Islamic Studies. pp. 445–446. ISBN 978-975-389-414-2.

Regnal titles
Preceded by Karaman Bey	Bey of Karaman; 1261–1277	Succeeded by Güneri
