= Firman of Karamanoğlu Mehmet Bey =

Mehmet Bey's firman was the decree of Mehmet I of Karaman (Karamanoğlu Mehmet), a vizier of Suljuks, declaring that the official language of Seljuks was Turkish. Mehmet Beg or Mehmet Bey of Karaman (Turkish: Karamanoğlu Mehmet Bey), also known as Shams al-Din Mehmed Beg was the third ruler of the Karamanids. His father was Karaman Bey.

Mehmet Fuat Köprülü suggested that the government officials, who had been educated under the influence of the Persian culture, had used the Persian language in their state's official business and the strong compulsion of using Persian as official language had lasted until a Karamanid lord, Mehmed Bey, invaded Konya.

Agop Dilaçar, who is known for his works on the Sun Language Theory, claimed that Mehmed Bey may have declared Turkish the official language of the state. According to Dilaçar, in his firman dated 13 May (15 May ?) 1277, Mehmed Bey ordered that:

"From this day forward, in the council, in the dervish lodge, in the court, in the assembly, in the square, no language but Turkish must be spoken".

After his failed rebellion in Ankara, Mehmed Bey died in the fighting against Seljuq-Mongol troops.

== See also ==
- Old Anatolian Turkish language
- Jimri
