= Doğrugöz =

Doğrugöz Eğrigöz
- Neighbourhood
- Location in Turkey Doğrugöz (Turkey Central Anatolia)
- Coordinates: 38°21′N 31°27′E
- Country: Turkey
- Province: Konya
- District: Akşehir
- Elevation: 1,000 m (3,300 ft)
- Population (2022): 3,306
- Time zone: UTC+3 (TRT)
- Area code: 0332

Doğrugöz (formerly Eğrigöz) is a neighbourhood of the municipality and district of Akşehir, Konya Province, Turkey. Its population is 3,306 (2022). Before the 2013 reorganisation, it was a town (belde).

== Geography ==
The town is 5 kilometres (3.1 mi) at the east of Akşehir. It is situated between a mountain range and a partially dried up lake. It is about 3.5 kilometres (2.2 mi) north east of Sultan Mountains and 14 kilometres (8.7 mi) south of Lake Akşehir.

== History ==
The vicinity of the town was probably inhabited during the Roman Empire era. Beginning by the Turkish domination in the 12th century, a han (a type of caravanserai) was built in the present location of the town. First inhabitant of the town was a certain Ali Baba who was responsible in running the han. Soon a village was established. The earliest names of the village were Eğriöz and Eğrigöz. After the event of Cimri (attempted coup) in 1277 the population of the village increased by the newcomers.

The village was declared township in 1959 and the town was renamed as Doğrugöz in 1983.

== Economy ==
Most of the town's agricultural area is composed of fruit orchards. The most important crops are cherries and sour cherries.
