= Jimri =

Pretender to the Sultanate of Rum

Ala al-Din Siyavush
- Sultan

Sultan of Rum (pretender)
- Reign: 1277
- Predecessor: Kaykhusraw III
- Successor: Kaykhusraw III
- Vizier: Mehmed
- Died: 1277
- Spouse: a Daughter of Kilij Arslan IV
Names
- Ala al-Din Siyavush Jimri

Jimri (Turkish: Cimri) was a pretender to the Sultanate of Rum, promoted by the Turkmen in the chaos after Baibars’ invasion of Mongol-dominated Anatolia in 1277. He was executed the following year. The pretender’s formal name, ‘Ala al-Din Siyavush, appears on his few coins, but the sources almost invariably refer to him by the derogatory nickname Jimri, or “the Miser”.

Following Baibars' withdrawal from Anatolia, the Mamluks’ Turkmen allies, the Karamanids, were encouraged by their successes against the Mongols and sought their own successor to the Seljuq throne. They felt that the serving sultan, Kaykhusraw III, was too much a tool of the Mongol overlords, since his youth and virtual captivity by the Mongols’ agents in Anatolia made him an inappropriate focus for local and specifically Muslim aspirations. The logical candidate was the deposed sultan Kaykaus II who, despite his exile in the Crimea, remained popular among the Turkmen. With Kaykaus II absent, the Karamanids introduced a proxy ruler, commonly known as Jimri, whom they declared the son of the exiled sultan. With the support of the Eshrefid and Menteshid, the Karamanids then seized Konya and established Jimri as Sultan of Rum. He was supplied with the superficial trappings of power, including a parasol pillaged from the tomb of Kayqubad the Great, who had ruled the then prosperous Sultanate of Rum half a century before. Jimri married a daughter of Kilij Arslan IV and named the Karamanid chief Mehmed Bey vizier at the prompting of his supporters.

The Mongol khan Abagha arrived in Anatolia too late to confront the Mamluks; he found instead widespread rebellion among the Turkmen, with Jimri as their nominal leader. The khan established himself in Kayseri, a city recently abandoned by Baibars, where he took revenge on the neighboring Turkmen. Mongol control of Konya was restored, the Karamanids eventually defeated, and Mehmed Bey and his brothers killed. With his mentor dead and Turkmen power in central Anatolia at a low point, Jimri escaped to Afyonkarahisar where he organized further resistance. In time, the Mongol vizier of Rum and guardian of the young Kaykhusraw III, Fakhr al-Din Ali, to whom the khan had given the region in fief, reestablished his authority. Jimri was captured and burned at the stake; his corpse was then flayed, stuffed with straw, and set upon a donkey which toured the cities of Anatolia as a warning to the Turkmen.

The Jimri affair, like the Baba Ishak uprising of thirty years before, is significant in that it demonstrates a growing Turkmen ascendancy in Anatolia. (see Babai Revolt) Jimri, though a puppet of the Karamanids, succeeded in uniting much of Turkish Anatolia against a foreign occupier. The chancellery established in his name was the first in Anatolia to use Turkish as its official language.

== See also ==
- Doğrugöz

== Sources ==
- Claude Cahen, Pre-Ottoman Turkey: a general survey of the material and spiritual culture and history, trans. J. Jones-Williams (New York: Taplinger, 1968), 289–92.
- Stephen Album, Checklist of Islamic Coins, 2nd edition (1998), p. 62.
