= Karamanoğlu Mehmetbey University =

Public university in Karaman, Turkey

Coordinates: 37.1779°N 33.2550°E

Karamanoglu Mehmetbey University
- Karamanoğlu Mehmetbey Üniversitesi
- Motto: Not ordinary, but in the desired university
- Type: Public
- Established: 2007
- Rector: Prof. Dr. Mehmet Gavgalı
- Academic staff: 753
- Students: 18253
- Location: Karaman, Turkey
- Campus: 43908 acres (1,776.926 m2); Urban
- Website: Official website

Karamanoğlu Mehmetbey University (Turkish: Karamanoğlu Mehmetbey Üniversitesi) is a public university in Karaman. The university is named after Shams al-Din Mehmed, the ruler of Karamanids principality during the late 13th-century.

== History ==
Karamanoğlu Mehmetbey University (KMU) is one of seventeen new universities which were established in 2007 by the Turkish Government. However the university's history dates back the Karaman Vocational School which was established as a part of Selcuk University in 1987. Several other academic units of KMU were established between 1991 and 1997 as a part of Selçuk University including Ermenek Vocational School in 1991, Karaman Faculty of Economics and Administrative Sciences and Vocational School of Health Services in 1992, Kazım Karabekir Vocational School in 1994, Health School of Health Science in 1996, and School of Physical Education and Sports in 1997. In 2006 and 2007, Faculty of Literature and Faculty of Kamil Özdağ Science were established as a part of Selçuk University.

All these academic units, which operated under the name of Selçuk University, have transferred to the KMU on 29 May 2007 that is the official establishment date of the KMU.

Karamanoğlu Mehmetbey University, which is currently among the important universities in Turkey with over 17 thousand students, 53 undergraduates, 67 associate degrees and 63 postgraduate (Master and Doctorate degrees) programs and over 1000 academic and administrative staffs, offers important contributions to the higher education community with its extensive campus, laboratories and conference rooms with international standards, modern library, social and sportive facilities. KMU contributes significantly the science especially in the research fields of Turkish language, clean energy, medical technology, food and agriculture Moreover, it aims to be a favorite higher education institution of people in its region by developing a brotherhood relationship with Balkans, Middle East and African countries.

== Academic Units ==
- Graduate School/Institute of Social Sciences
- Graduate School/Institute of Sciences
- Graduate School/Institute of Medical Sciences
- Faculty of Literature
- Faculty of Economics and Administrative Sciences
- Kamil Özdağ Faculty Of Science
- Faculty of Engineering
- Faculty of Medicine
- Faculty of Medical Sciences
- Faculty of Sport Sciences
- Faculty of Islamic Sciences
- Ahmet Keleşoğlu Faculty of Dentistry
- Faculty of Education
- Faculty of Art, Design and Architecture
- Scientific Research Project Center
- Continuing Education Application and Research Center
- Woman Research Application and Research Center

== Notable alumni ==
- Taha Akgül, Olympic, World, and European champion Turkish freestyle wrestler
- Soner Demirtaş, European champion Turkish freestyle wrestler

== Presidents/Rectors ==
President/Rector	From	Until
Prof. Dr. Sabri Gökmen	2007	2017
Prof. Dr. Mehmet Akgül	2017	2021
Prof. Dr. Namık Ak	2021	2022

== See also ==
- List of universities in Turkey
- Karaman
