= Sahib Ataids =

Turkish polity

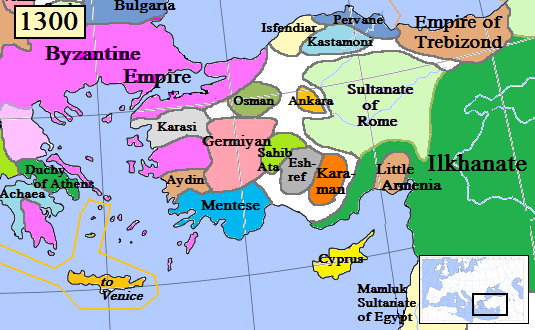
Sahib Ataids in 1300

Sahib Ataids (Modern Turkish: Sâhipataoğulları or Sâhipataoğulları Beyliği) was a Turkish Anatolian beylik (principality) centred in Kara Hisar-i Sâhib (Afyonkarahisar) and founded by one of the last viziers of the Seljuk Sultanate of Rûm, Fakhr al-Din Ali, also known as Sâhib Ata. The beylik was founded c.1275 and absorbed by the neighbouring Germiyanids in 1341. The Sâhipataoğulları left important works of architecture.

== Rulers ==
Bey	Reign	Notes
Taceddin Hüseyin Nusreddin Hasan	1275–1277	Co-Rulers
Şemseddin Mehmed	1277–1287	
Nusreddin Ahmed	1287–1341	
