= Kaykhusraw III =

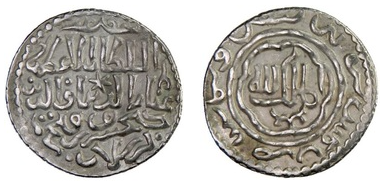
- Rare dirham minted around 1265-1284 in the name of Kaykhushraw III

Sultan of Rum
- Reign: 1266–1284
- Predecessor: Kilij Arslan IV
- Successor: Mesud II
- Born: c. 1259–1263
- Died: 1284 (aged 20–25)
- Issue: Fatima Khatun
Names
- Ghiyāth ad-Dīn Kaykhusraw bin Qilij Arslān
- House: House of Seljuq
- Father: Kilij Arslan IV

Kaykhusraw III (Old Anatolian Turkish: كَیخُسرو سوم, Turkish: Gıyâseddin Keyhüsrev) or Ghiyāth ad-Dīn Kaykhusraw bin Qilij Arslān (Persian: غياث الدين كيخسرو بن قلج ارسلان; c. 1259-1263 – 1284) was between two and six years old when in 1265 he was named Seljuq Sultan of Rûm. He was the son of Kilij Arslan IV, the weak representative of the Seljuq line who was controlled by the Pervane, Mu’in al-Din Suleyman.

== Reign (1265-1284) ==
Mu’in al-Din Suleyman, empowered by the Mongol khan Abagha, had Kilij Arslan IV executed in 1266. The young Kaykhusraw became no more than a figurehead and played no part in the events of his reign, which were dominated first by the Pervane, the Mongol vizier of Rum and Fakhr al-Din Ali.

In 1277, following the chaos of Mongol-dominated Anatolia after the invasion of Mamluk Sultan Baibars and his defeat of the Mongols at the Battle of Elbistan, the Karamanids under Shams al-Din Mehmed managed to capture Konya, briefly installing Jimri as a puppet ruler of the Sultanate of Rum.

In 1283 Kaykhusraw was co-opted by the Mongol Kangirtay into a revolt against the Ilkhan sovereign Ahmed. Kaykhusraw was executed for his involvement in the rebellion in March 1284.

Kaykhusraw III was the last Seljuk sultan buried in the dynastic mausoleum at the Alaeddin Camii in Konya.

== The throne of Kaykhusraw III ==
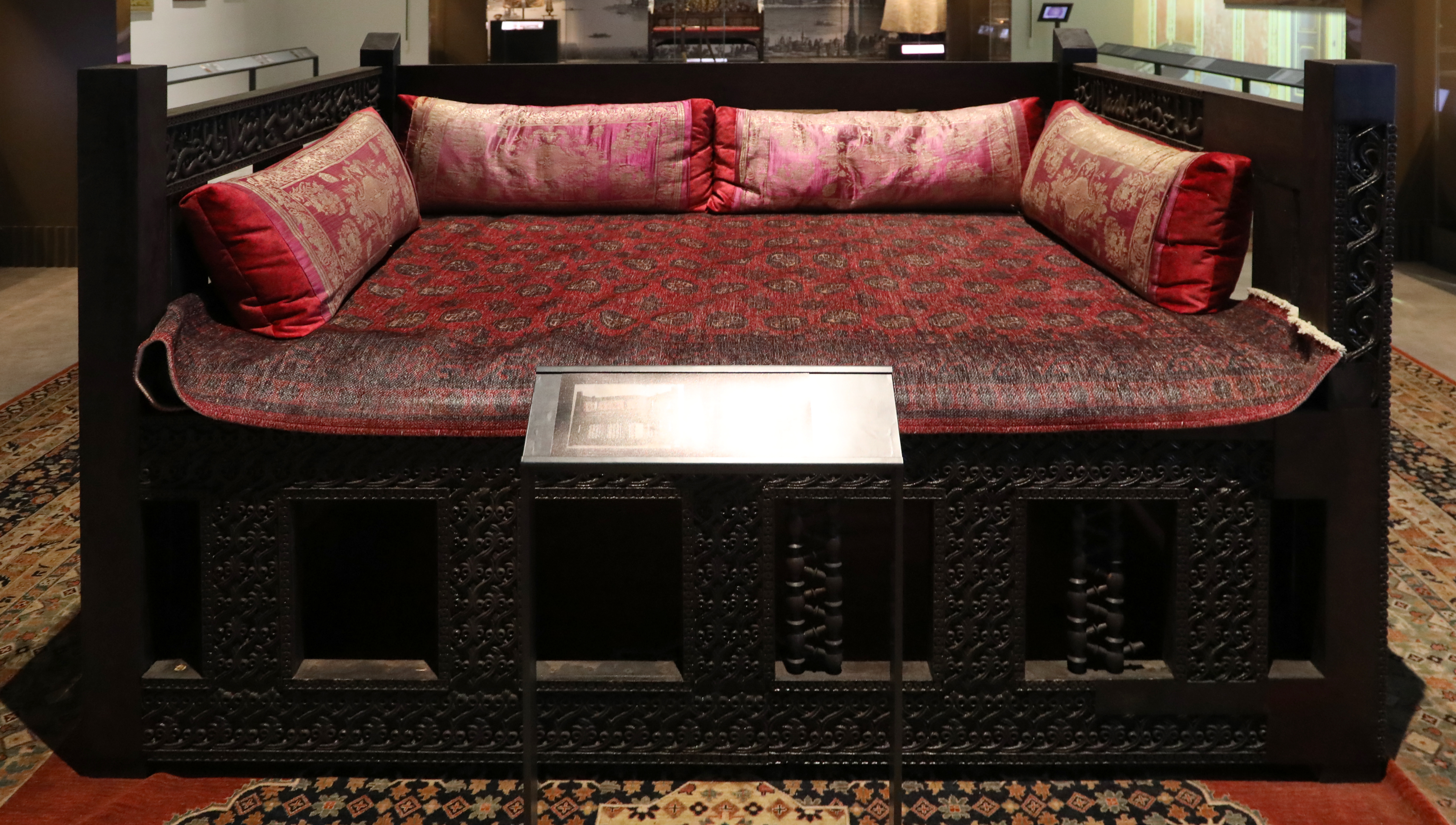
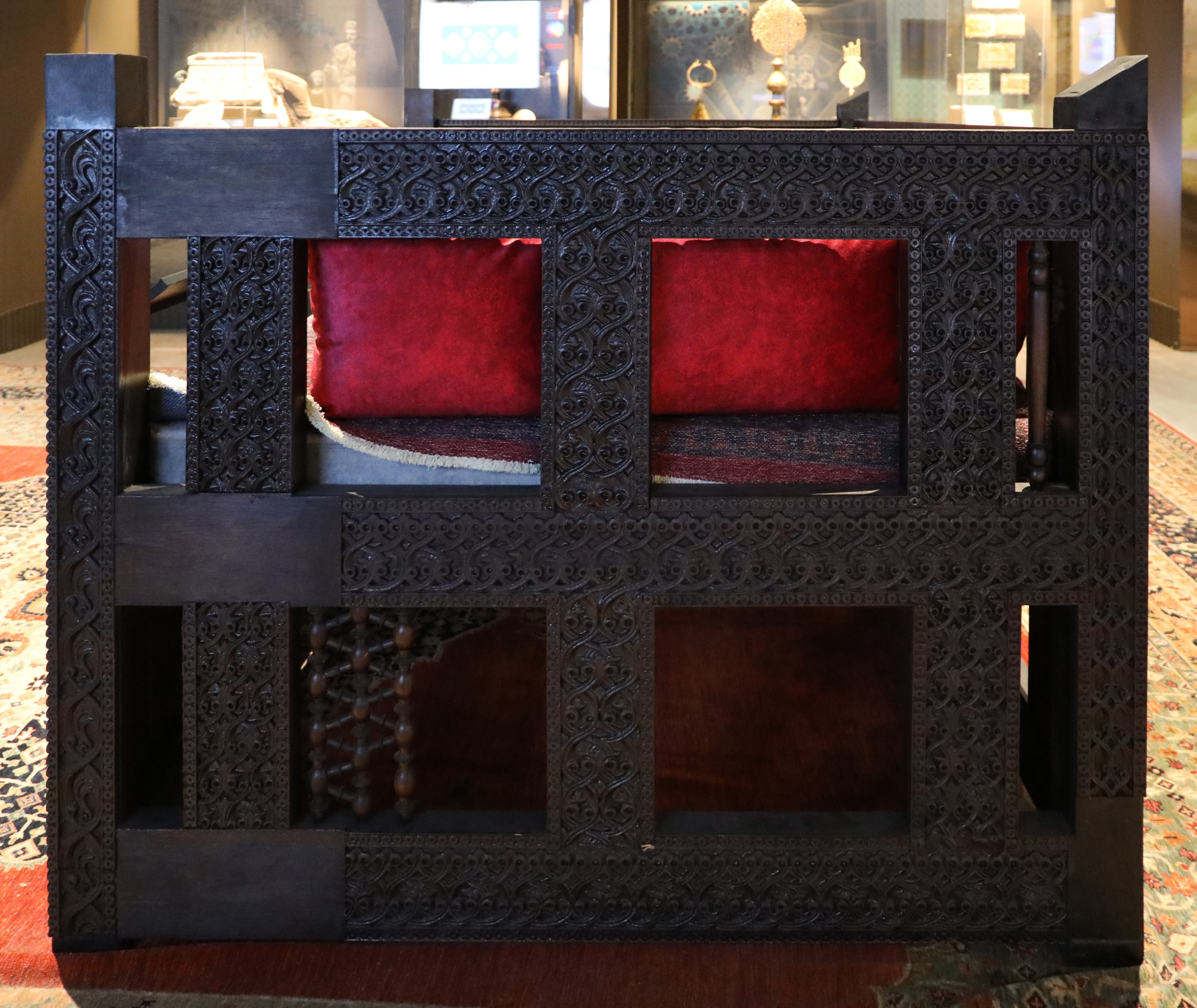
The wooden throne associated with Kaykhusraw III (1265-84). Ethnography Museum of Ankara.

His throne, a fine example of Seljuq woodcarving, survives in the Ethnography Museum of Ankara. It was previously housed in the Kızıl Bey Camii in Ankara.

== Manuscripts ==
A manuscript is known by Naṣīr al-Dīn Muḥ bin Ibrāhīm, who lived at the court of Ġīyās̱ al-Dīn Kay H̱usraw III. The manuscript is dated to 1272-1273 CE. It is a collection of works in prose and in verse, with miniatures.

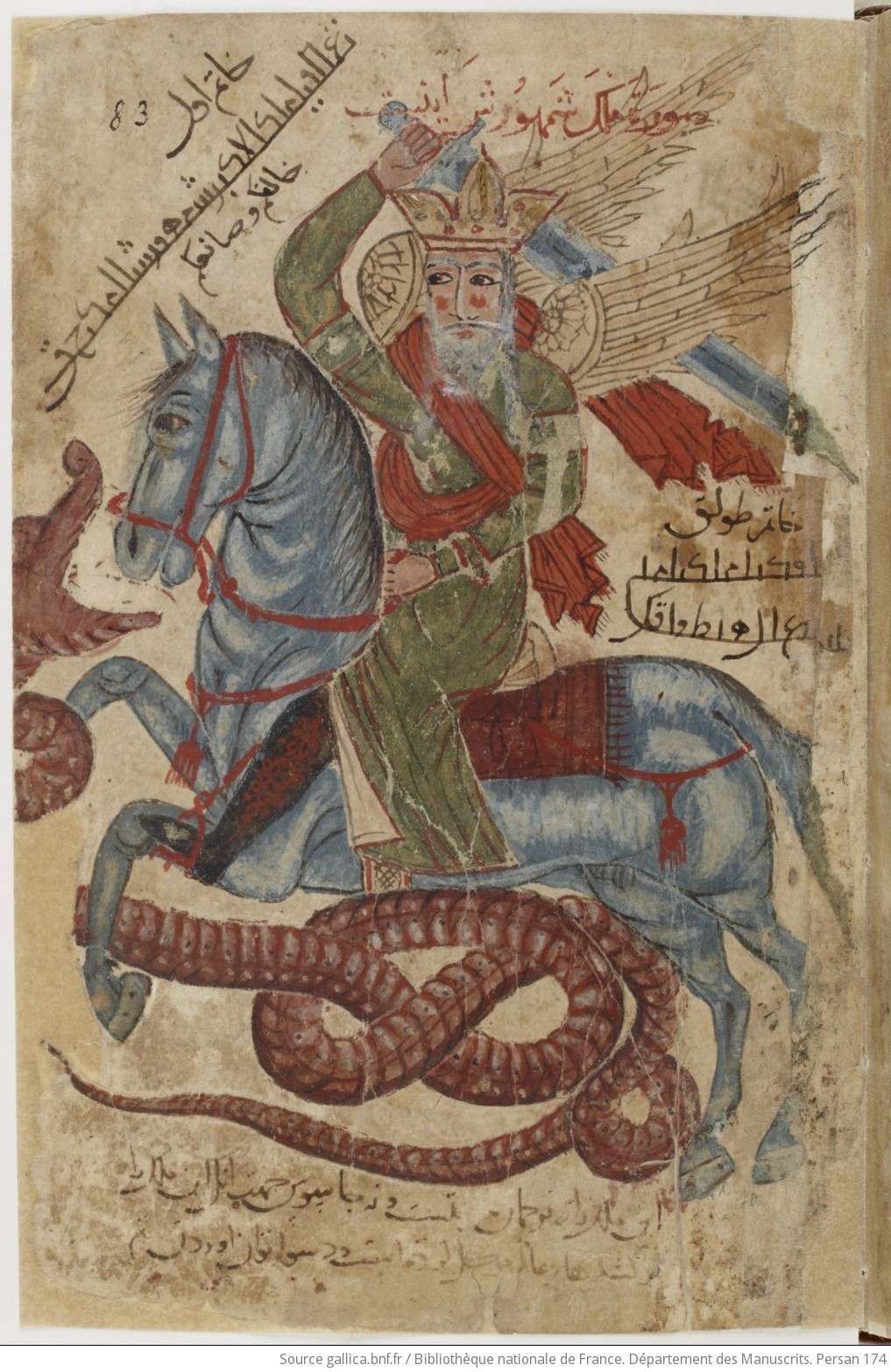
Daqāʾiq al-Ḥaqāʾiq; Kitāb-i Mūʾnis al-ʿAvārif, Folio 83r

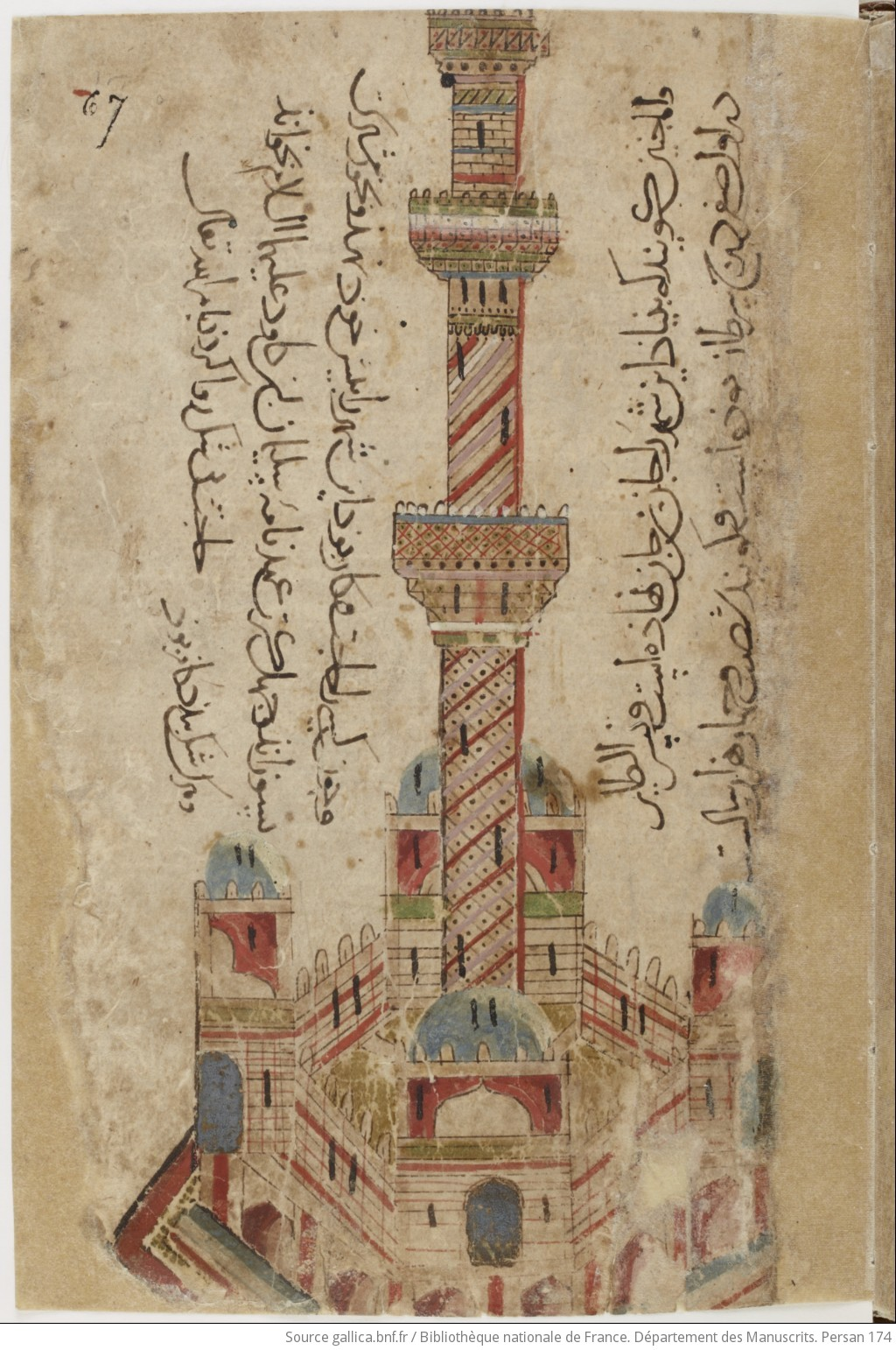
Daqāʾiq al-Ḥaqāʾiq; Kitāb-i Mūʾnis al-ʿAvārif, Folio 67r

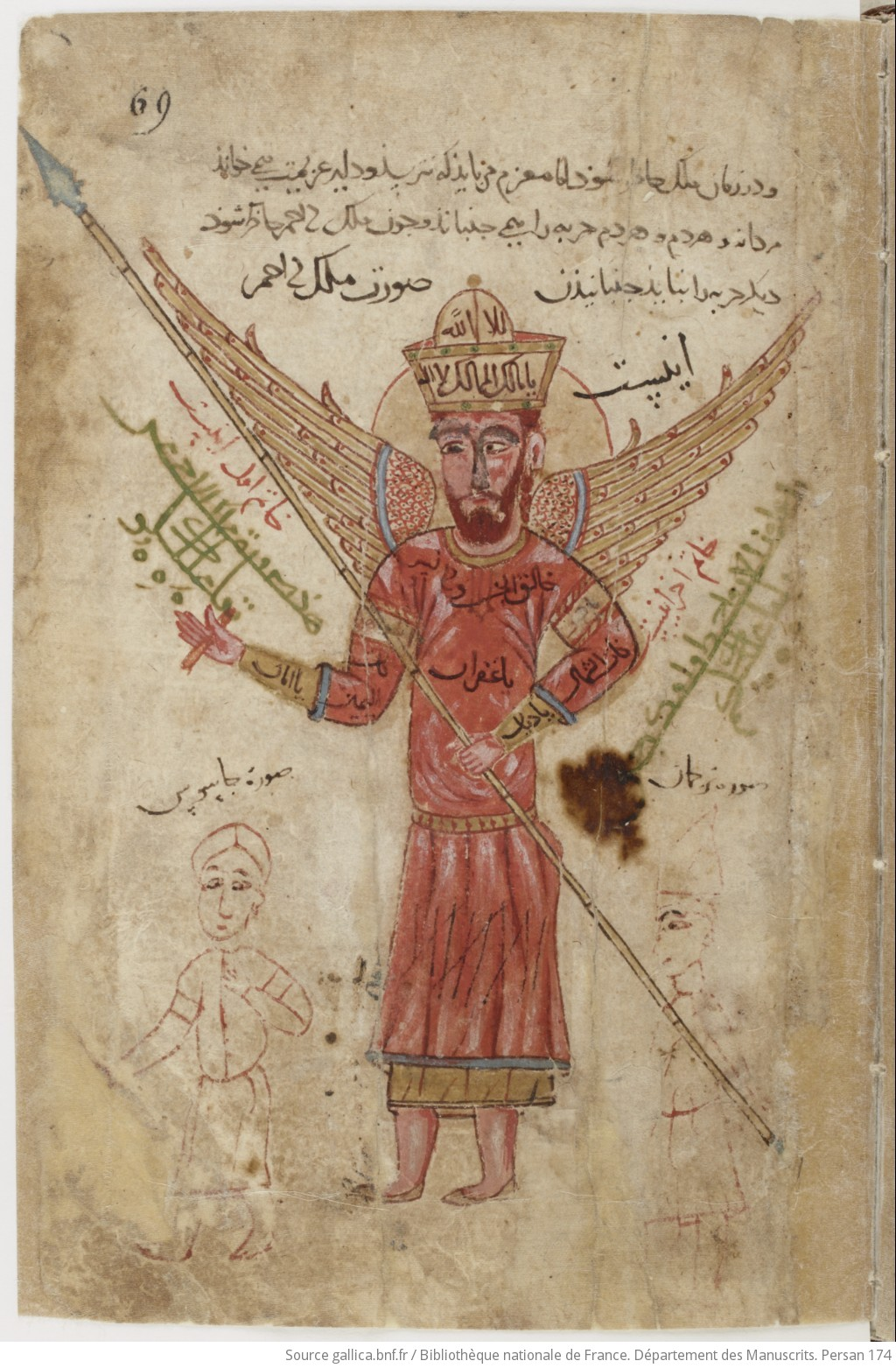
Daqāʾiq al-Ḥaqāʾiq; Kitāb-i Mūʾnis al-ʿAvārif, Folio 69r

== Sources ==
- Claude Cahen, Pre-Ottoman Turkey: a general survey of the material and spiritual culture and history, trans. J. Jones-Williams, (New York: Taplinger, 1968) 284 ff.
- Blue Guide: Turkey (London: A&C Black, 1995) 602.

Preceded by Kilij Arslan IV	Sultan of Rûm; 1266–1284	Succeeded by Mesud II
