= Firman =

Royal mandate or decree

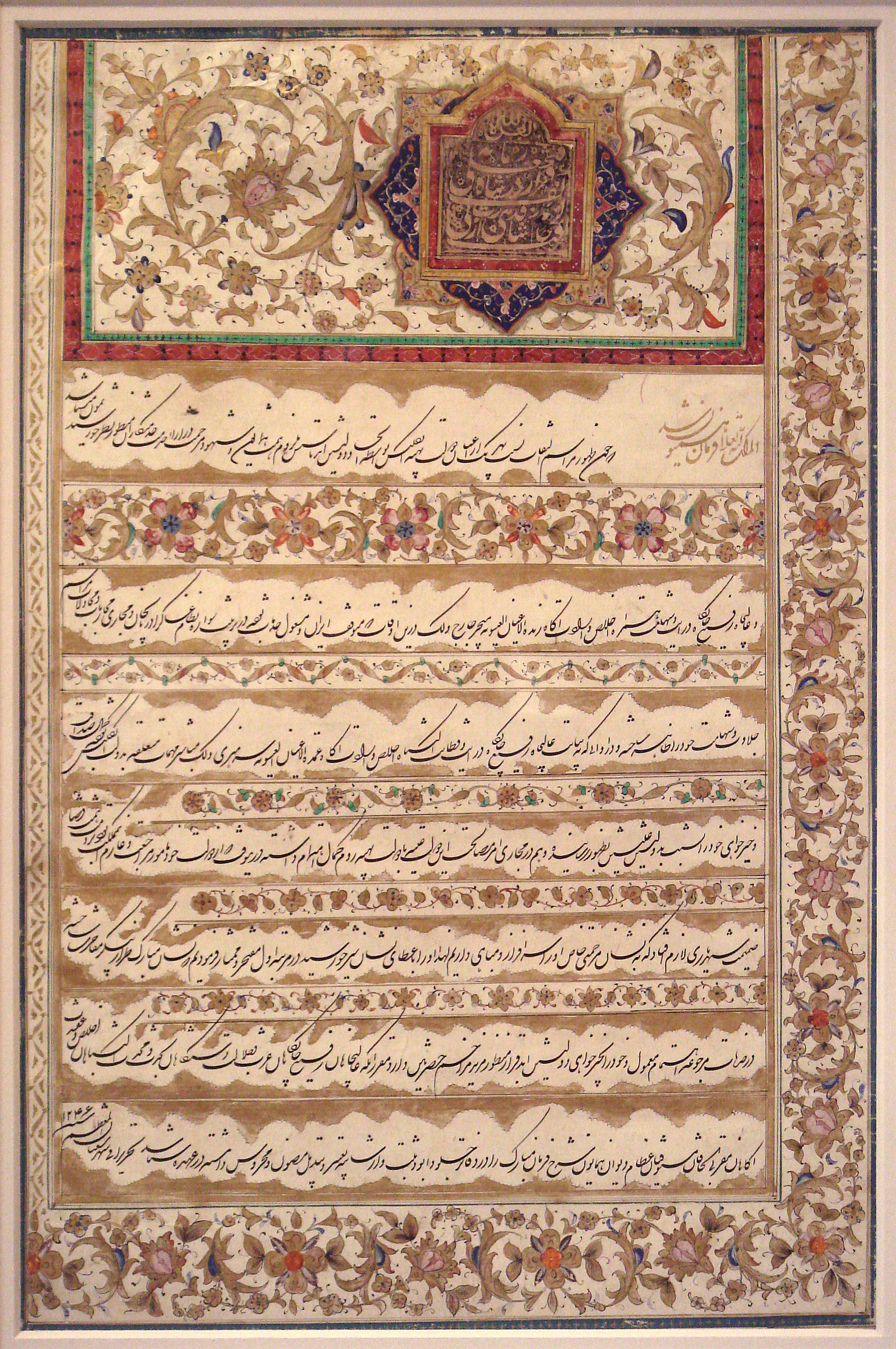
A Fat'h Ali Shah Qajar firman in Shekaste Nastaliq script, January 1831

A firman (Persian: فرمان, romanized: farmān; Turkish: ferman), at the constitutional level, was a royal mandate or decree issued by a sovereign in an Islamic state. During various periods such firmans were collected and applied as traditional bodies of law. The English word firman comes from the Persian farmān meaning "decree" or "order".

== Etymology ==
Farmān is the modern Persian form of the word and descends from Middle Persian (Pahlavi) framān, ultimately from Old Persian framānā (fra = "fore"). The difference between the modern Persian and Old Persian forms stems from "dropping the ending ā and insertion of a vowel owing to the initial double consonant". This feature (i.e. fra-) was still used in the Middle Persian form. The Turkish form of the word farmān is fermān, whereas the Arabized plural form of the word is farāmīn.

== Origins of firmans in the Ottoman Empire ==
In the Ottoman Empire, the Sultan derived his authority from his role as upholder of the Shar'ia, but the Shar'ia did not cover all aspects of Ottoman social and political life. Therefore, in order to regulate relations and status, duties, and the dress of aristocracy and subjects, the Sultan created firmans.

== Organization ==
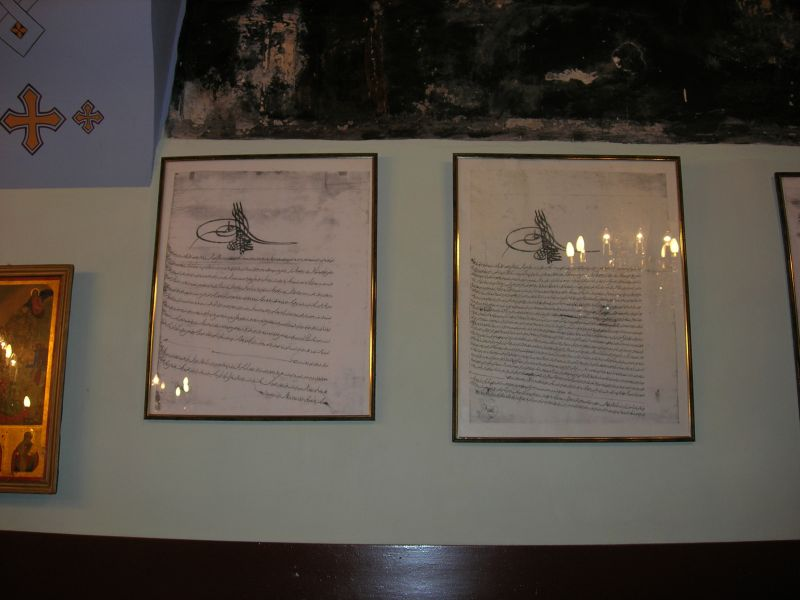
Firmans of Mehmed II and Bayazid II – kept at the Church of Saint Mary of the Mongols in Istanbul – which granted the ownership of the building to the Greek community

Firmans were gathered in codes called "kanun". The kanun were "a form of secular and administrative law considered to be a valid extension of religious law as a result of the ruler's right to exercise legal judgement on behalf of the community."

When issued by the sultan in the Ottoman Empire, firmans' importance was often displayed by the layout of the document; the more blank space at the top of the document, the more important the firman was.

== Examples of Ottoman firmans ==
=== Firman of Murad (26 October – 23 November 1386) ===
In this firman, Sultan Murad I recognises a decree created by his father Sultan Orhan (c. 1324–1360). He gives the monks (Christian) all they owned during his father's reign, ordering that no one can oppress them or claim their land.

=== Firman of Mehmed the Conqueror (30 August 1473) ===
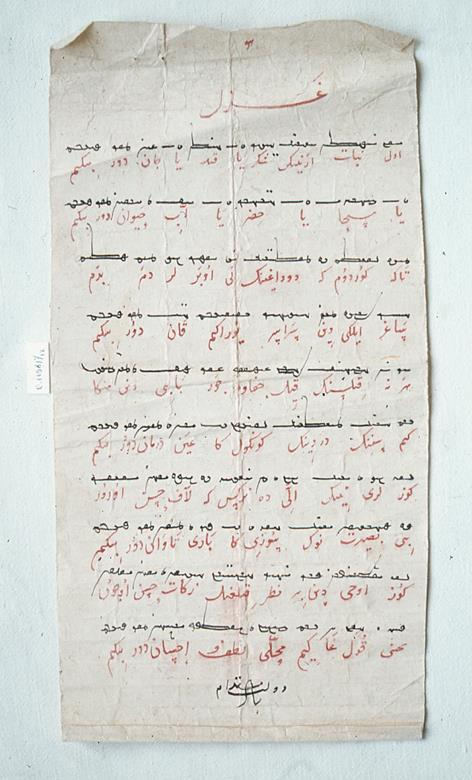
Mehmed the Conqueror's bilingual (Ottoman and Chagatai) Fetihname (Declaration of conquest) after the Battle of Otlukbeli.

Following the defeat of Uzun Hasan, Mehmed the Conqueror took over Şebinkarahisar and consolidated his rule over the area. From Şebinkarahisar he sent a series of letters announcing his victory, including an unusual missive in the Uyghur language addressed to the Turkomans of Anatolia.

The decree (yarlık) had 201 lines and was written by Şeyhzade Abdurrezak Bahşı on 30 August 1473:

Completed when Karahisar was reached on the date of eight hundred and seventy eight, 5th day of the month Rebiülahir, the year of the Snake.

=== Firman of Mehmed IV (1648–1687) ===
In this firman, the monks of Mount Athos report that the administrative officials charged with the collection of taxes come at a later date than they are supposed to and demand more money than the value assessed. They also make illegal demands for additional food supplies.

== Other firmans ==
One of the most important firmans governing relations between Muslims and Christians is a document kept at the Saint Catherine's Monastery on the Sinai Peninsula in Egypt. This monastery is Greek Orthodox and constitutes the autonomous Sinai Orthodox Church. The firman bears the hand print of Muhammad, and requests the Muslims do not destroy the monastery for God-fearing men live there. To this day there is a protected zone around the monastery administered by the Egyptian government, and there are very good relations between the 20 or so monks, mainly from Greece, and the local community there.

Firmans were issued in some Islamic empires and kingdoms in India such as the Mughal Empire and the Nizam of Hyderabad. Notable were Emperor Aurangzeb's various firmans.

== Other uses ==
The term "firman" was used by the archeologist/novelist Elizabeth Peters for official permission from the Egyptian Department of Antiquities to carry on an excavation. A similar authority was cited by Austen Henry Layard for excavations at Nimrud which he mistakenly believed was Nineveh.

In the Old Yishuv Court Museum is held a firman for the 1890 opening of the printing business of Eliezer Menahem Goldberg, Jerusalem resident. The firman was translated into Hebrew from Turkish by Advocate Yosef Hai Fenizil, and shows that the business was located in Rehov Hayehudim and had permission to undertake printing in Turkish, Arabic, Hebrew, English, German, French and Italian.

The Yazidis refer to the many attempts to eradicate their people as firmans, from the orders given by regional governments. They believe themselves to be on the 74th firman.

== Gallery ==
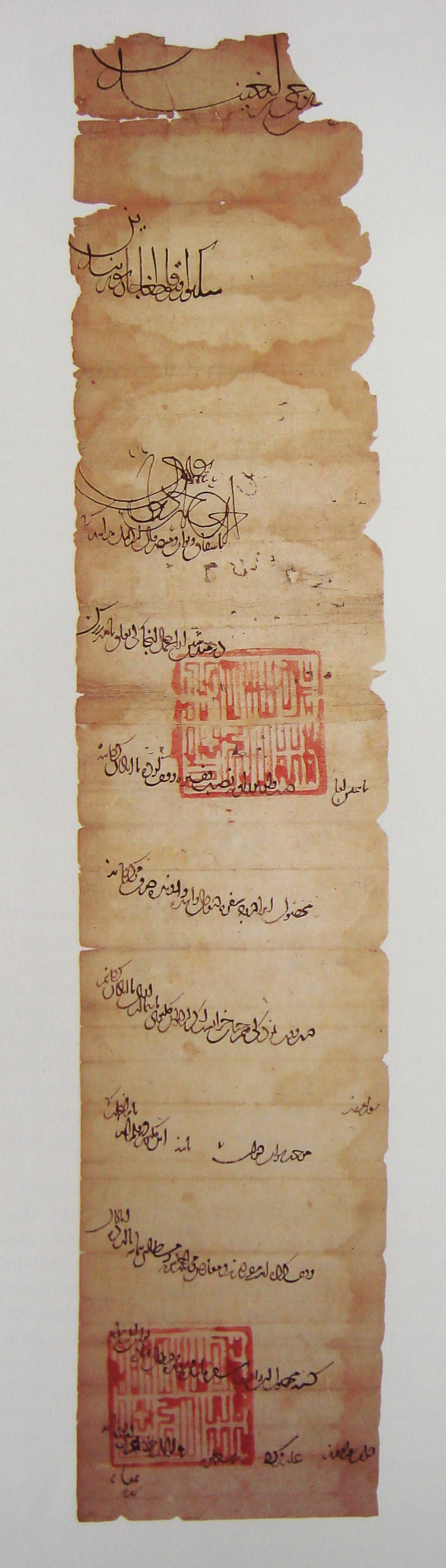
Firman of Sadr al-Din Zanjani, vizier of ilkhan Gaykhatu, dated Jumada II 692/June 1292. Art and History Collection on loan to the Arthur M. Sackler Gallery

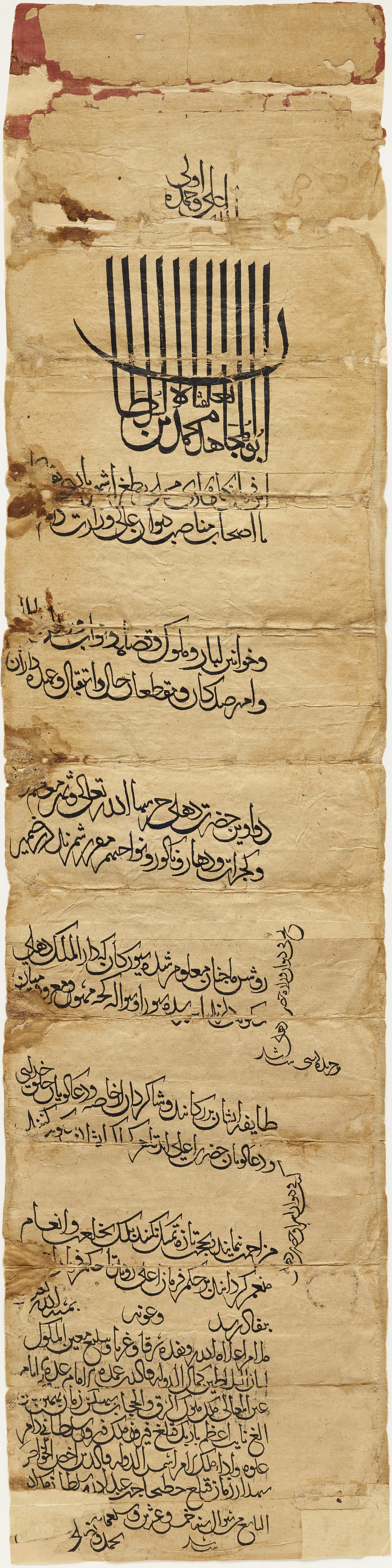
Firman of Muhammad bin Tughluq dated Shawwal 725 AH/September–October 1325. Keir Collection

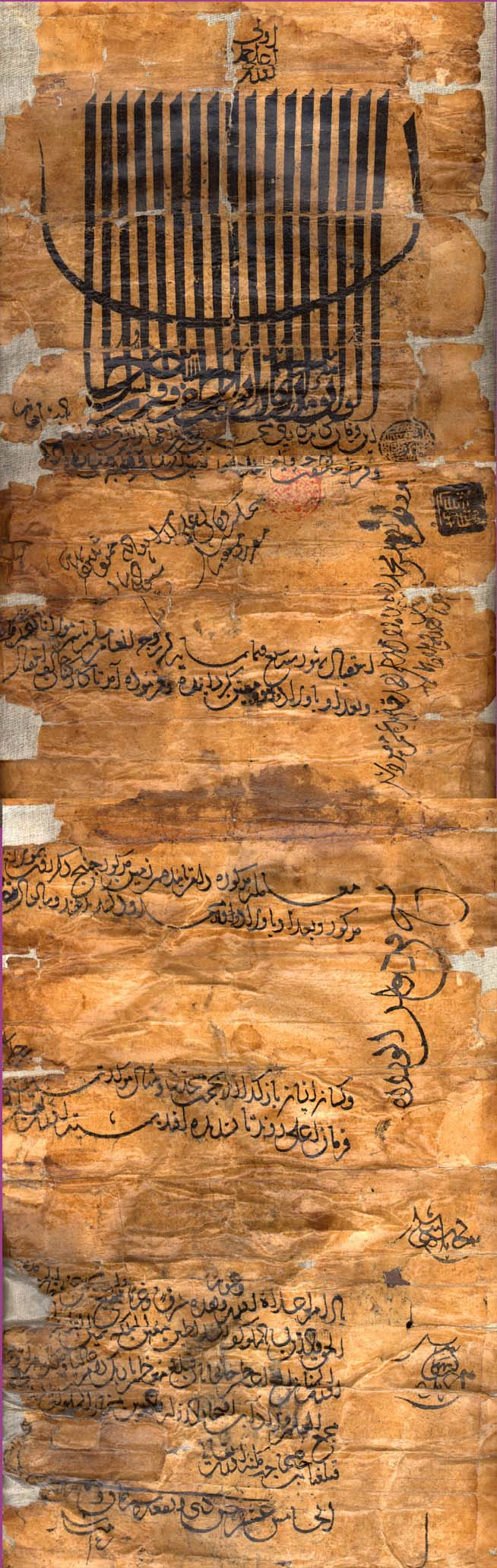
Firman of Taj ud-Din Firuz Shah of the Bahmani Sultanate dated 1405–06. Andhra Pradesh State Archives

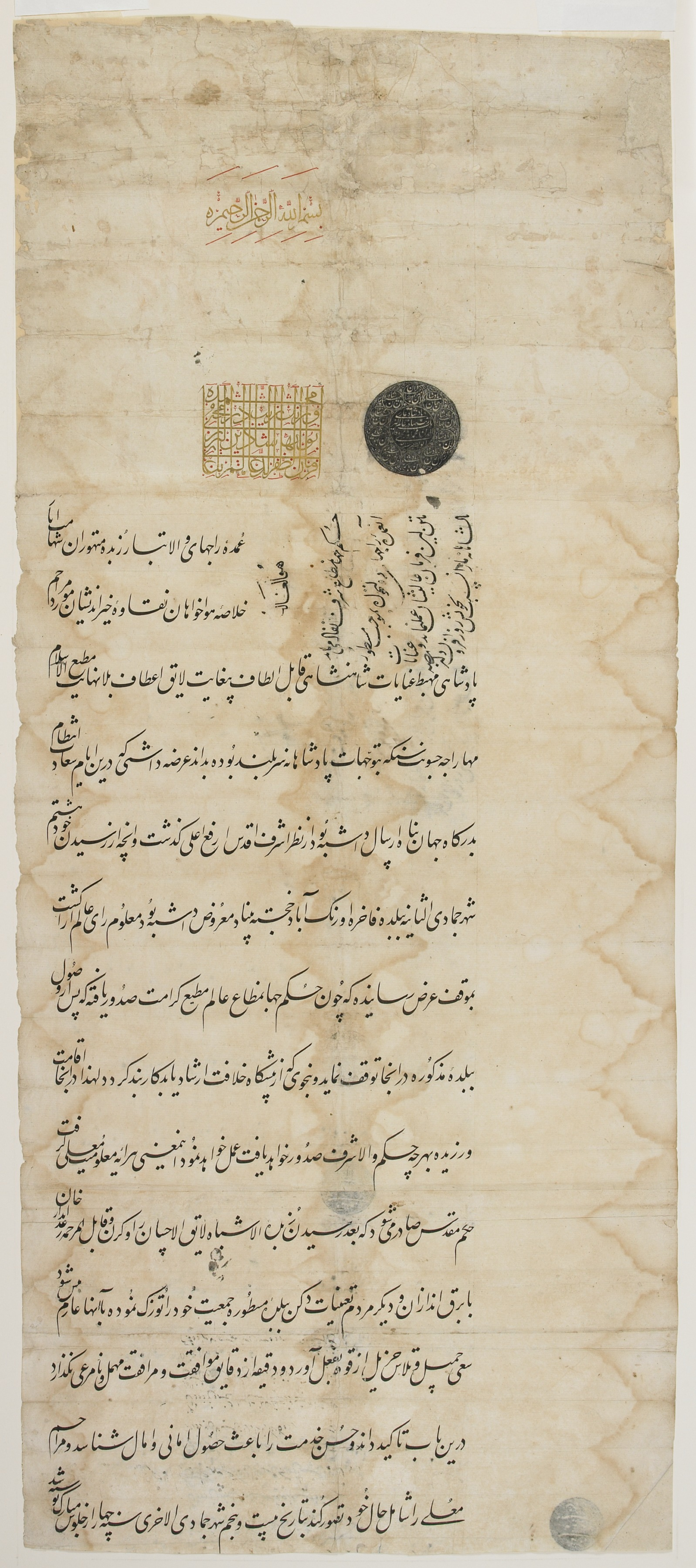
Firman of Aurangzeb dated 25th Jumadi II of 1072 AH/15 February 1662. Arthur M. Sackler Gallery

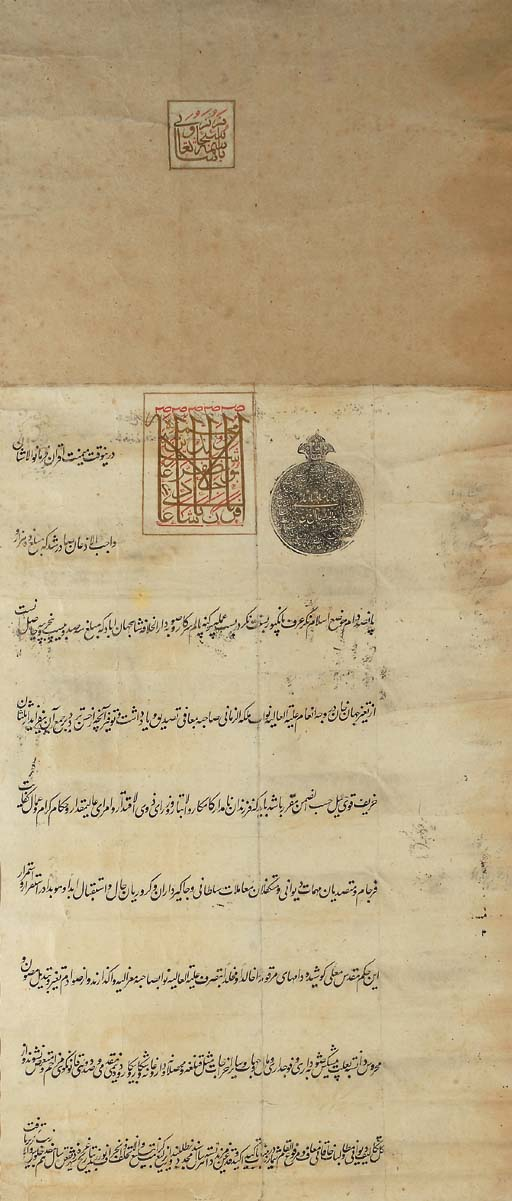
A firman issued by the Mughal Emperor Shah Alam II

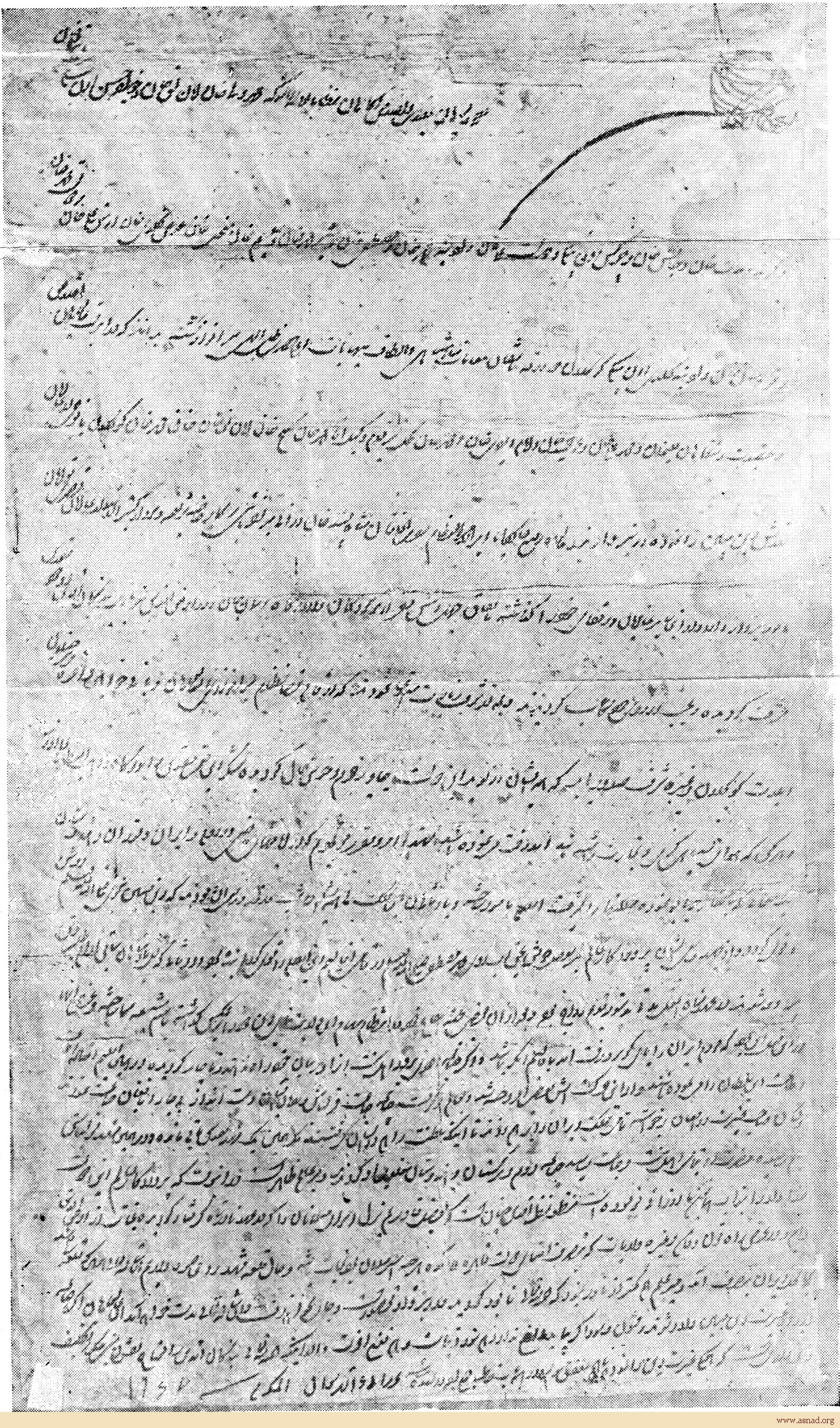
A firman issued by Ahmad Shah Durrani, the founder of the Durrani Empire

== See also ==
- Firman of Karamanoğlu Mehmet Bey
- Firman of Mahbub Ali Khan
- Waqf
- Decree of Muharram
