= Sâhib Ata =

Sultanate of Rum official

Grand Vizier Sahip Ata
- صاحب اتا فخر الدين علي
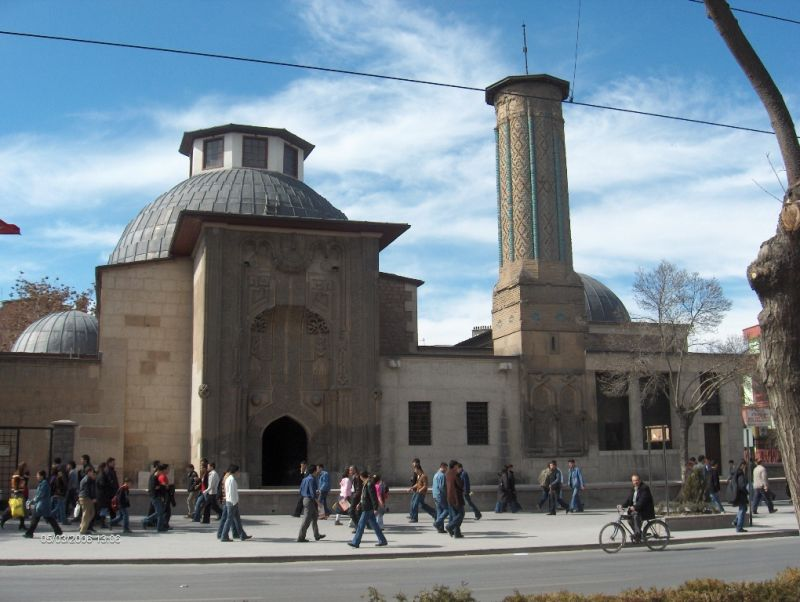
- The Sahip Ata Mosque complex in Konya, built by Sahip Ata.

Grand Vizier of the Sultanate of Rum
- In office 1259–1288
- Monarchs: Kaykaus II; Kilij Arslan IV; Kaykhusraw III; Mesud II
- Preceded by: Mu'in al-Din Parwana

Personal details
- Died: 22 November 1288 Akşehir, Konya, Sultanate of Rum
- Resting place: Sahip Ata Complex, Konya
- Occupation: Statesman, Vizier

Fakhr al-Din Ali, better known as Sâhib Ata or Sâhip Ata, was a vizier of the Sultanate of Rum who held a number of high offices at the court of the Sultanate of Rum from the 1240s until his death in 1288. He was the son of Hüseyin el-Konevî, a member of an established family settled in Konya. The earliest recorded official role of Sahib Ata Fakhr al-Din Ali in the Anatolian Seljuk State was that of amir-i dad (chief justice). He was the dominant personality in Anatolia after the death of the Mu'in al-Din Parwana in 1277. His sons, Taj al-Din Husayin and Nasir al-Din Hasan, were killed in 1277 during a battle against the Karamanid forces led by Mehmed I. of Karaman. He established numerous charitable foundations in cities across the Sultanate of Rum. Facing difficulties due to the heavy tax demands of the Ilkhanid ruler, Sahib Ata returned to Konya from Tabriz in ill health. He died shortly after, on 22 November 1288, in the village of Nadir near Akşehir, and was buried in his tomb in Konya.

Fakhr al-Din's sons, the Sahib Ataids, established a short-lived principality centered in Afyonkarahisar, which the neighboring Germiyanids absorbed ca. 1341.

== Monuments ==
Fakhr al-Din left many architectural monuments. In 1271 he funded the construction of the Gök Medrese in Sivas.
