= Hatuniye Complex =

Külliye in Tokat, Turkey

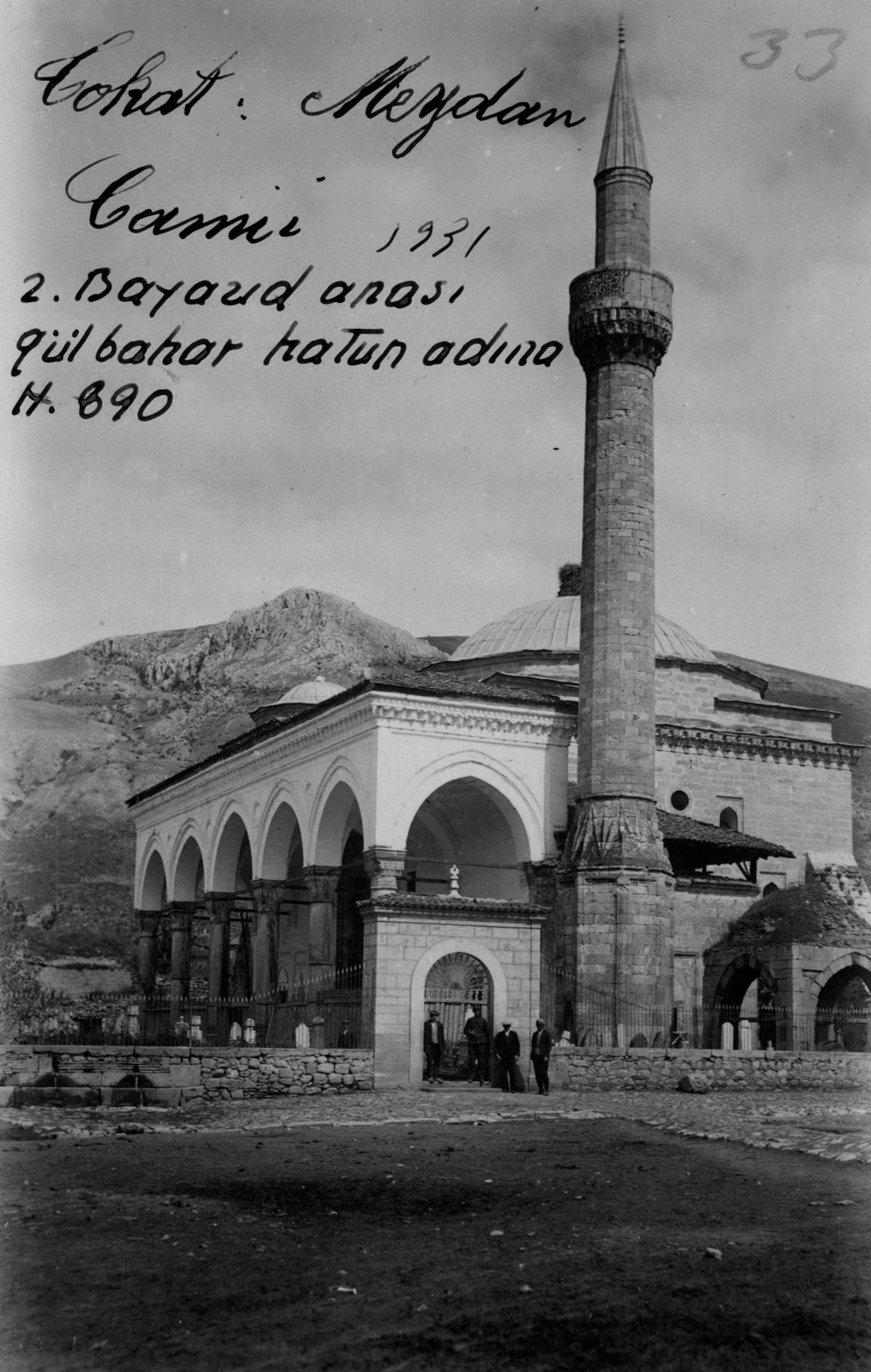
Hatuniye Mosque and madrasa

Hatuniye Complex (Turkish: Hatuniye Külliyesi) is a historical külliye, an Islamic religious complex, located in the city center of Tokat, Turkey. Its 1485 construction was ordered by Ottoman Sultan Bayezid II in honour of his mother, Gülbahar Hatun. Its facilities include a mosque, an imaret, and a medrese. At present, the mosque is used for prayer and other religious services, while the rest of the complex is open to visits by tourists and the public in general.

== Gallery ==
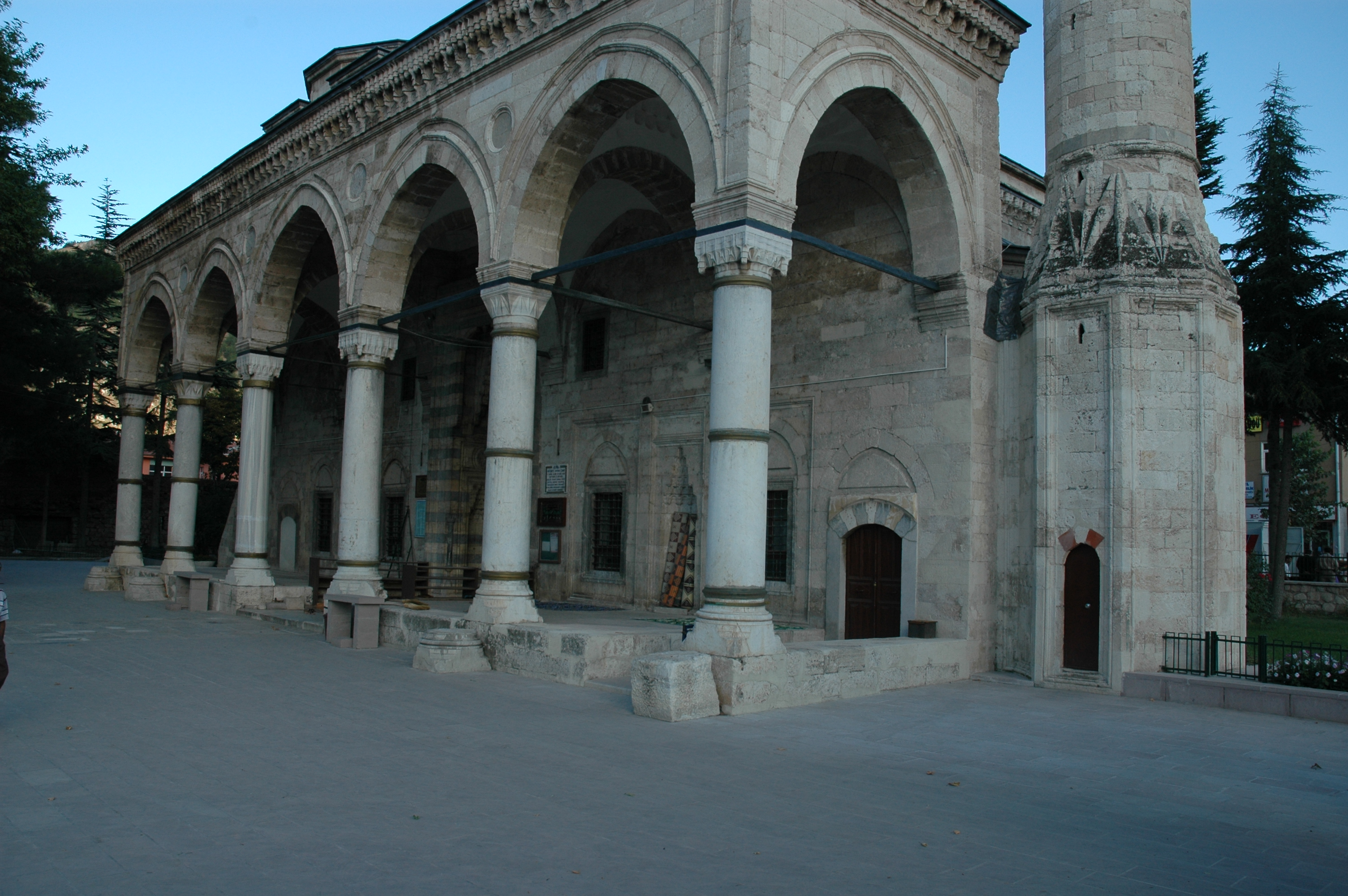
Tokat Hatuniye Mosque Front

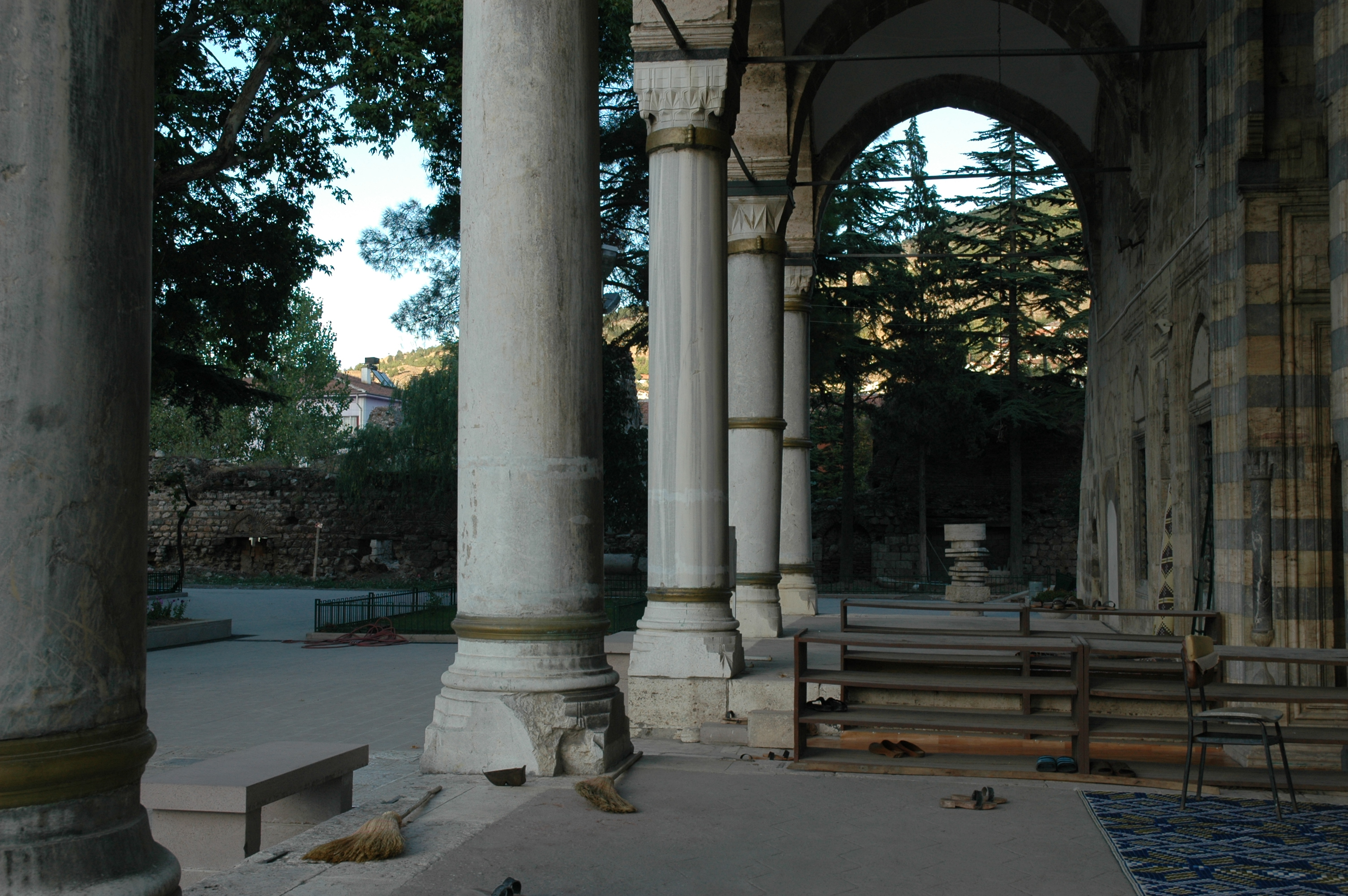
Tokat Hatuniye Mosque Son cemaat area

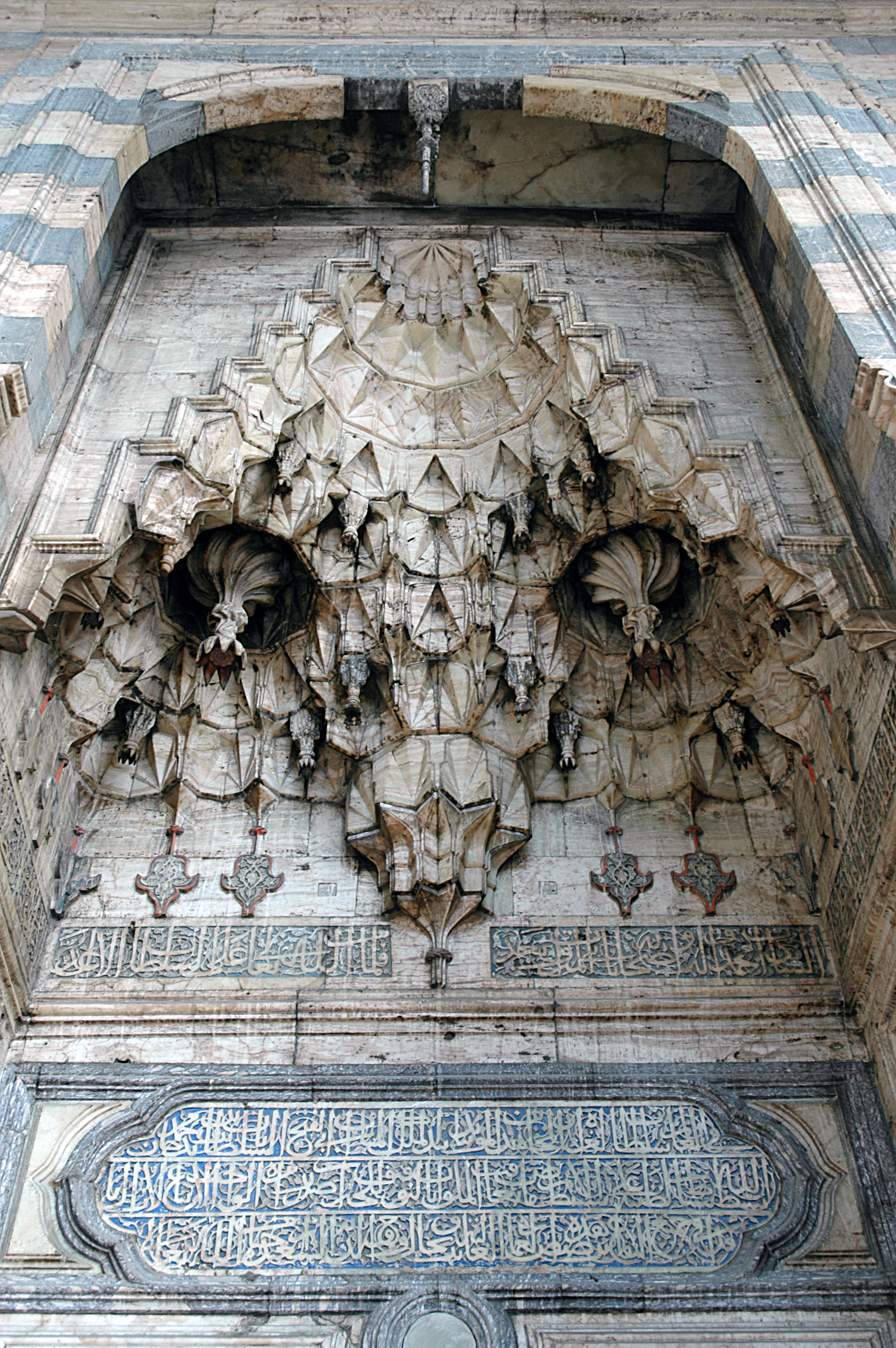
Tokat Hatuniye Mosque Muqarnas above entrance

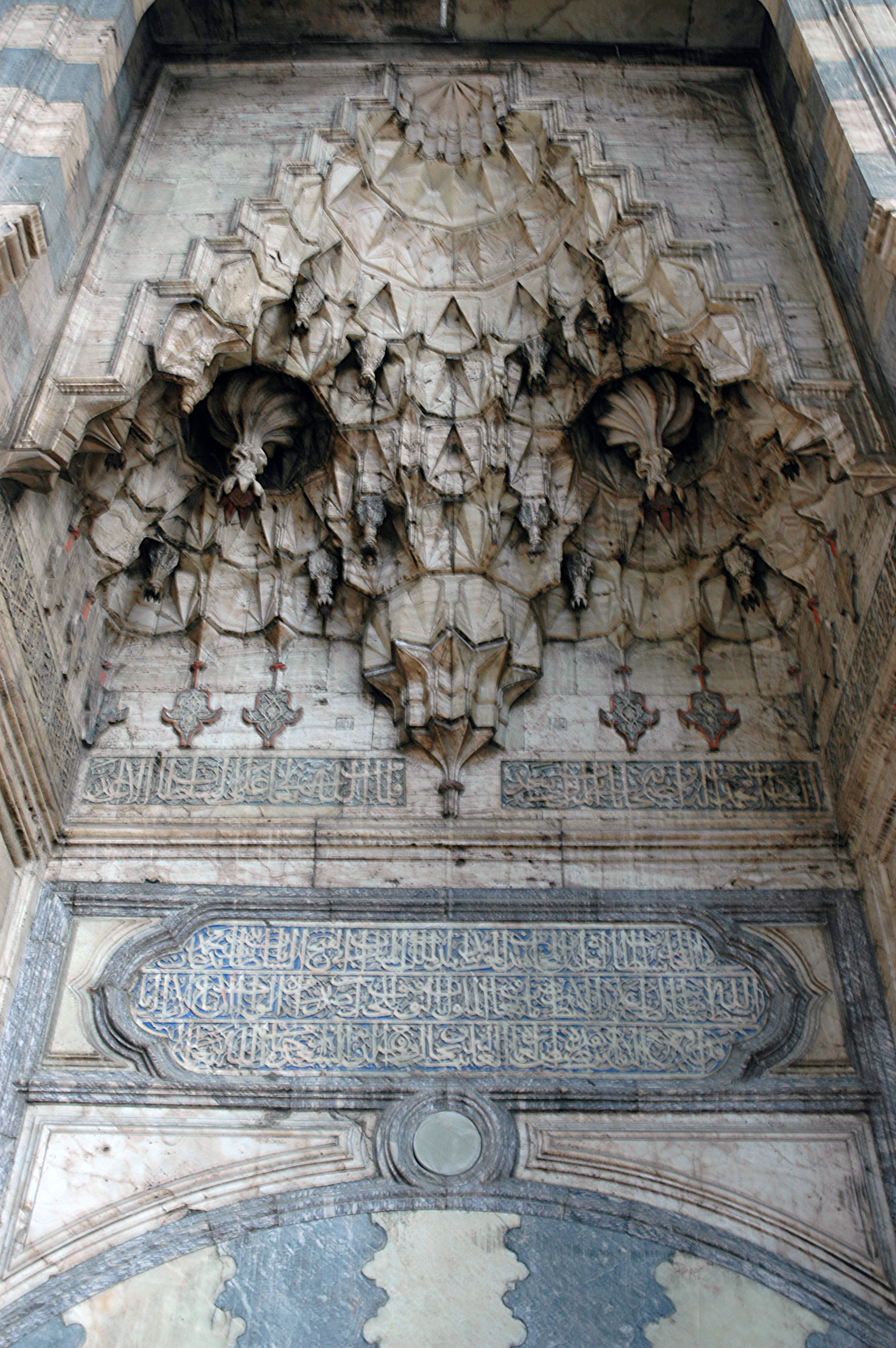
Tokat Hatuniye Mosque Muqarnas above entrance

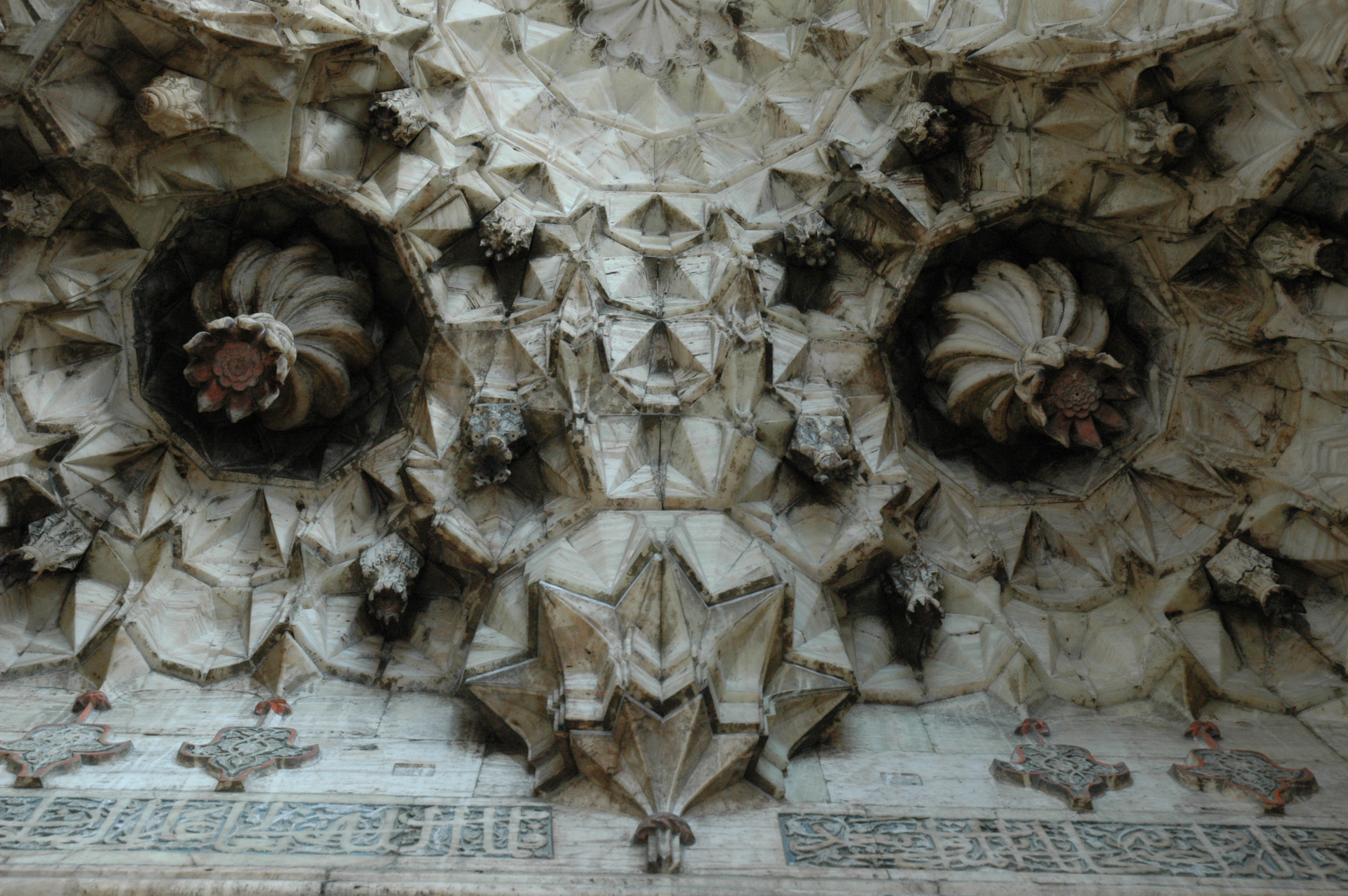
Tokat Hatuniye Mosque Muqarnas above entrance close up

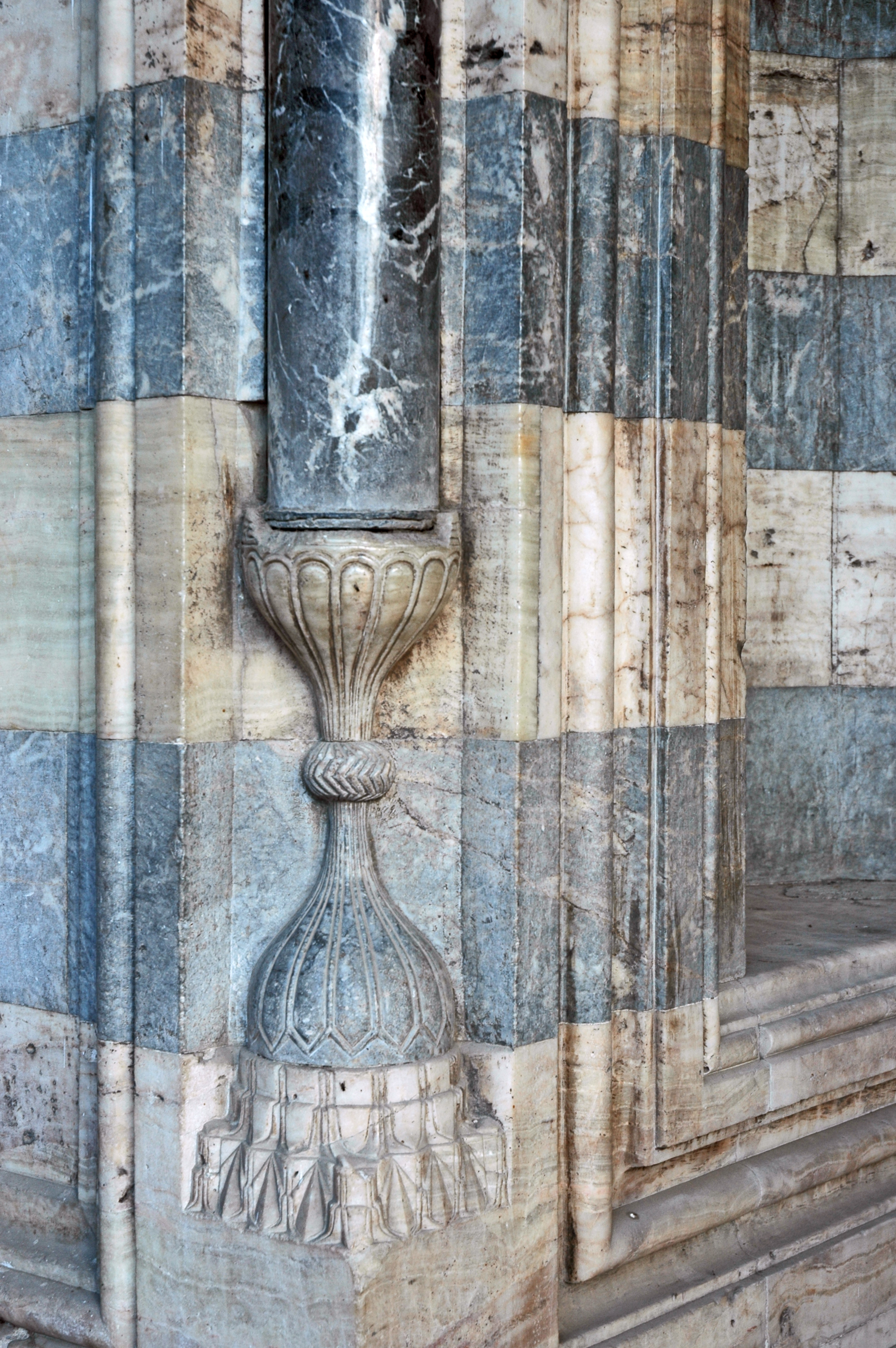
Tokat Hatuniye Mosque Decoration at entrance

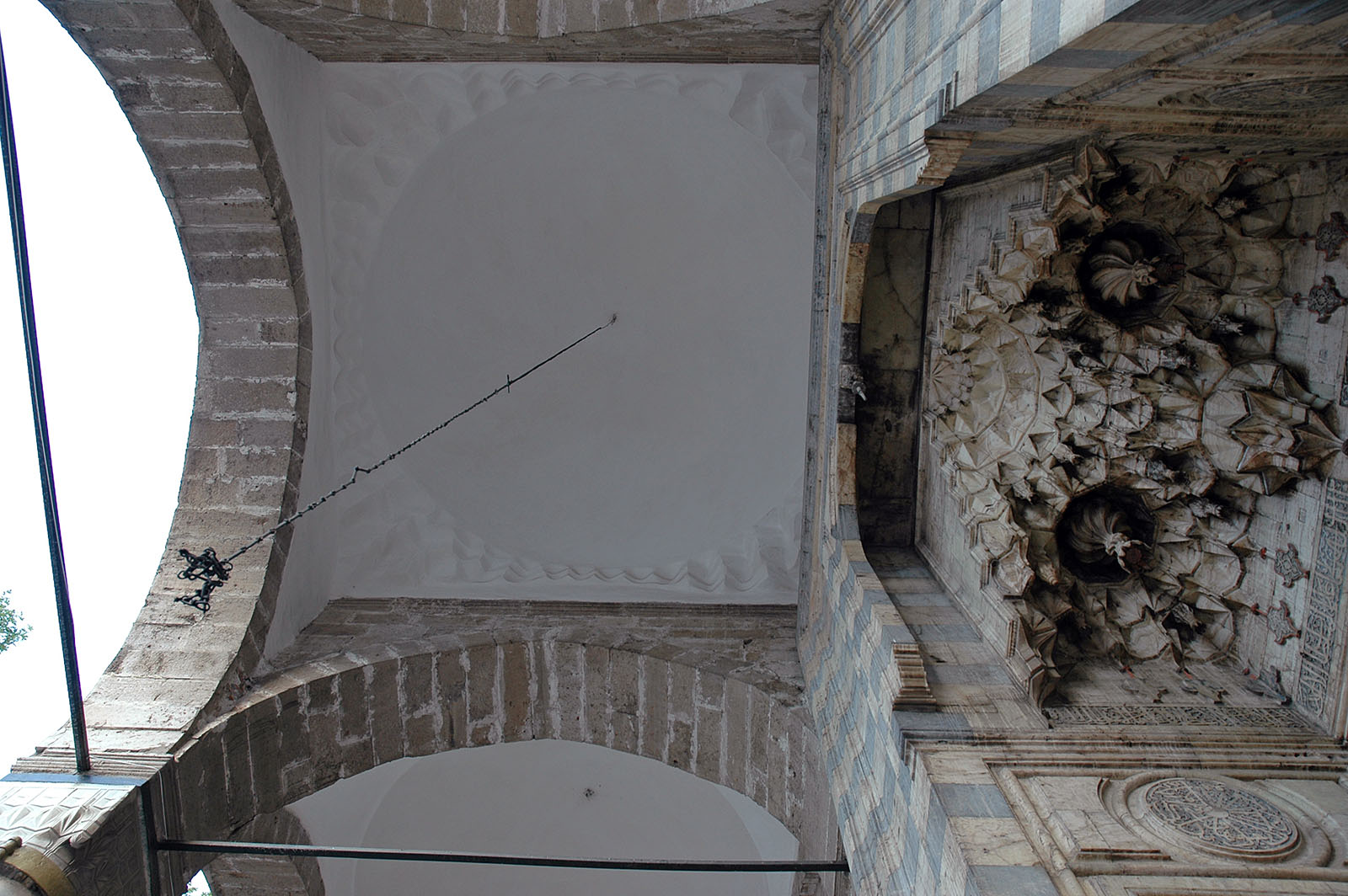
Tokat Hatuniye Mosque Muqarnas and dome above entrance

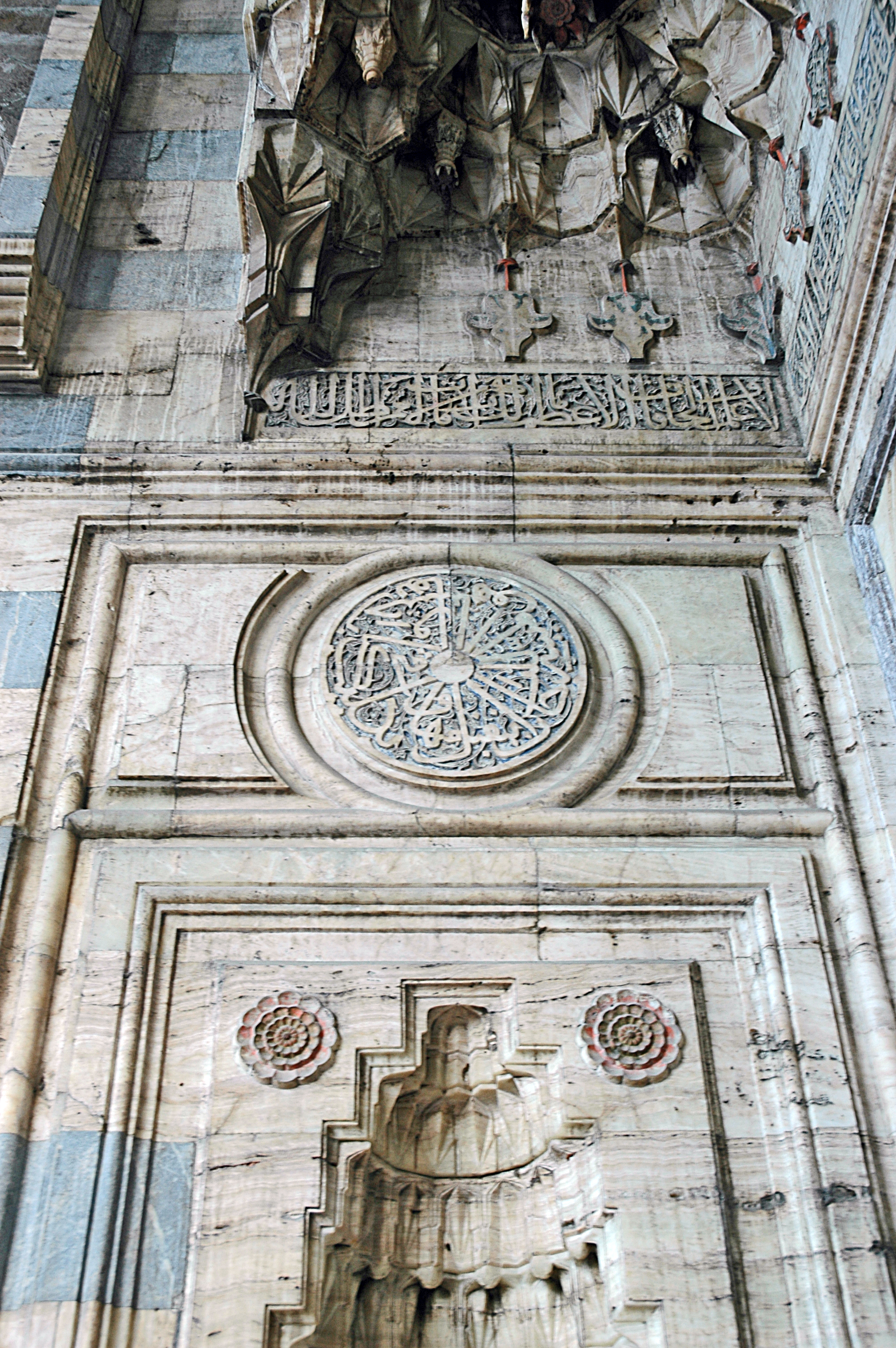
Tokat Hatuniye Mosque Side of entrance

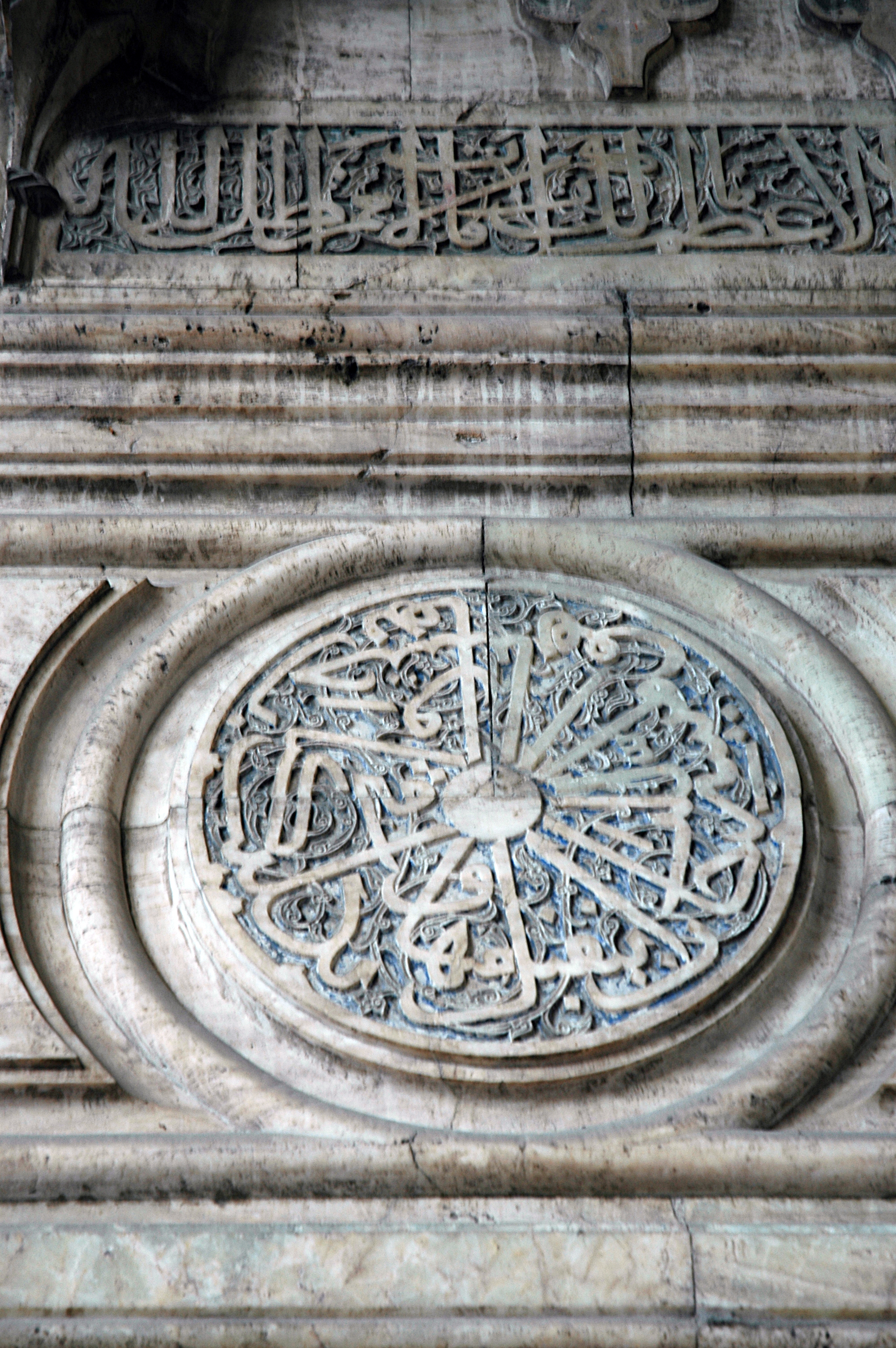
Tokat Hatuniye Mosque Decoration to side of entrance

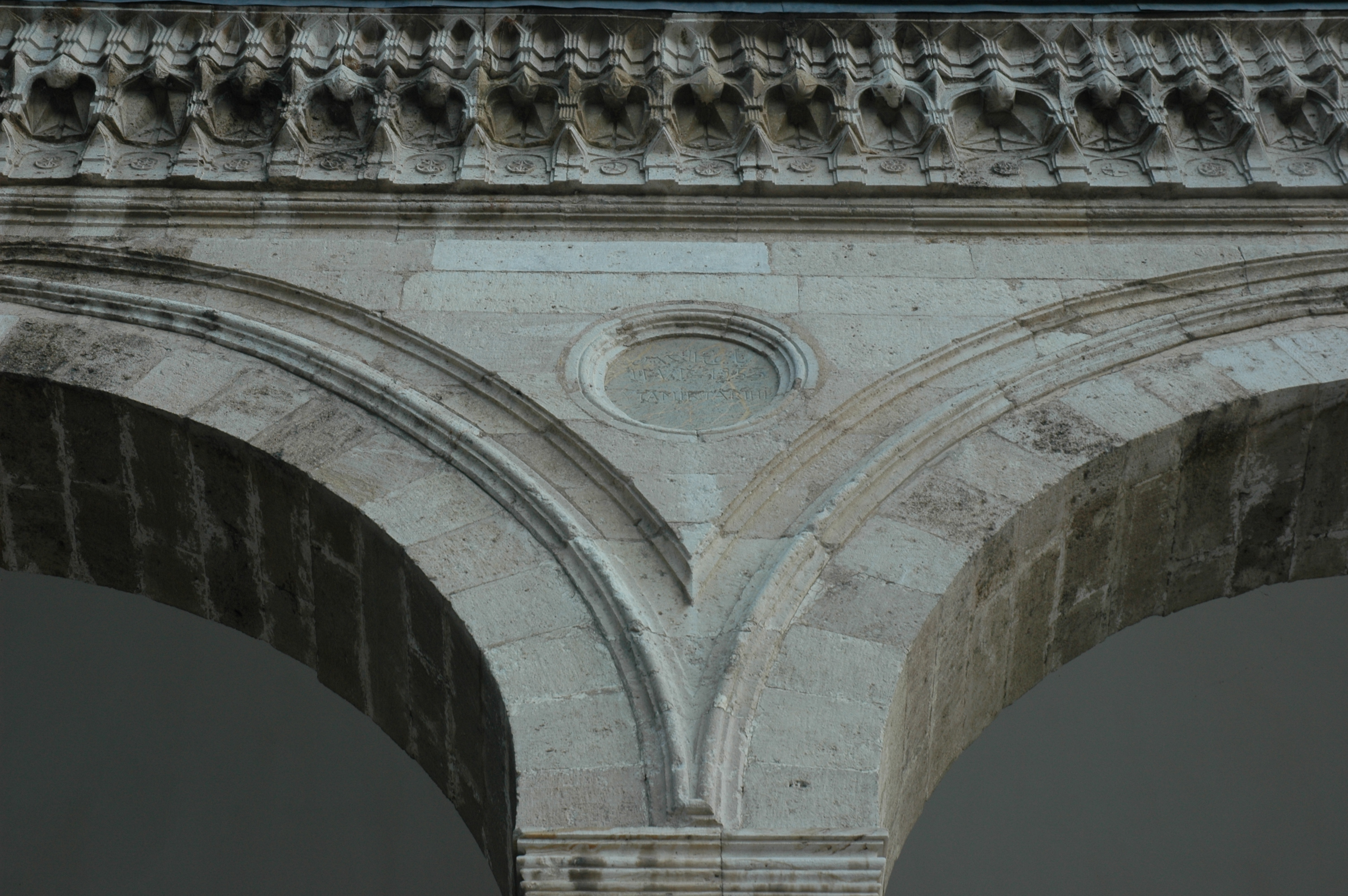
Tokat Hatuniye Mosque Decoration along front

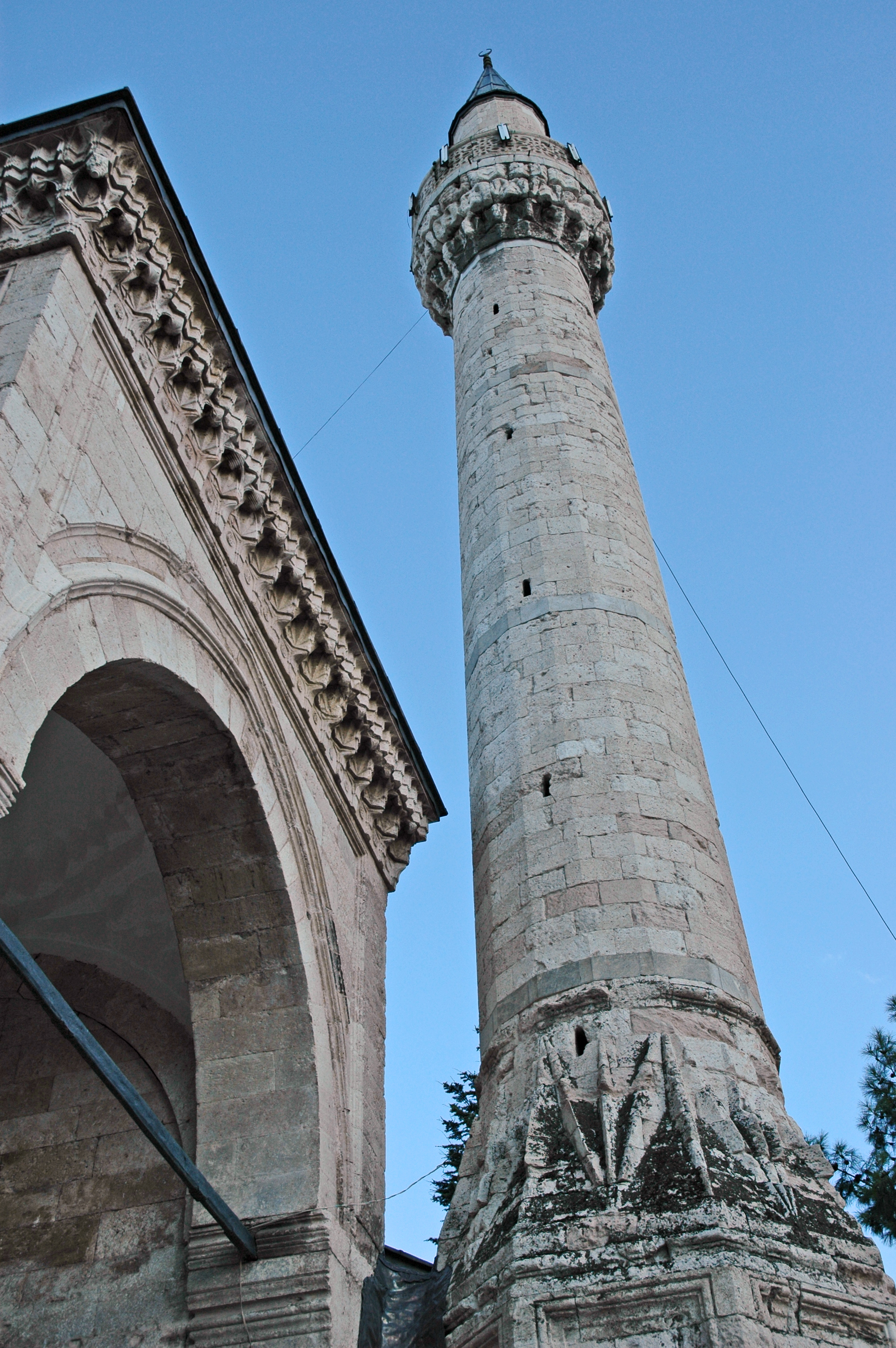
Tokat Hatuniye Mosque Minaret

== See also ==
- Hatuniye Medrese
