= Hatuniye Medrese =

Madrasa in Karaman, Turkey

Coordinates: 37.1829°N 33.2115°E

Hatuniye Medrese Hatuniye Medresesi
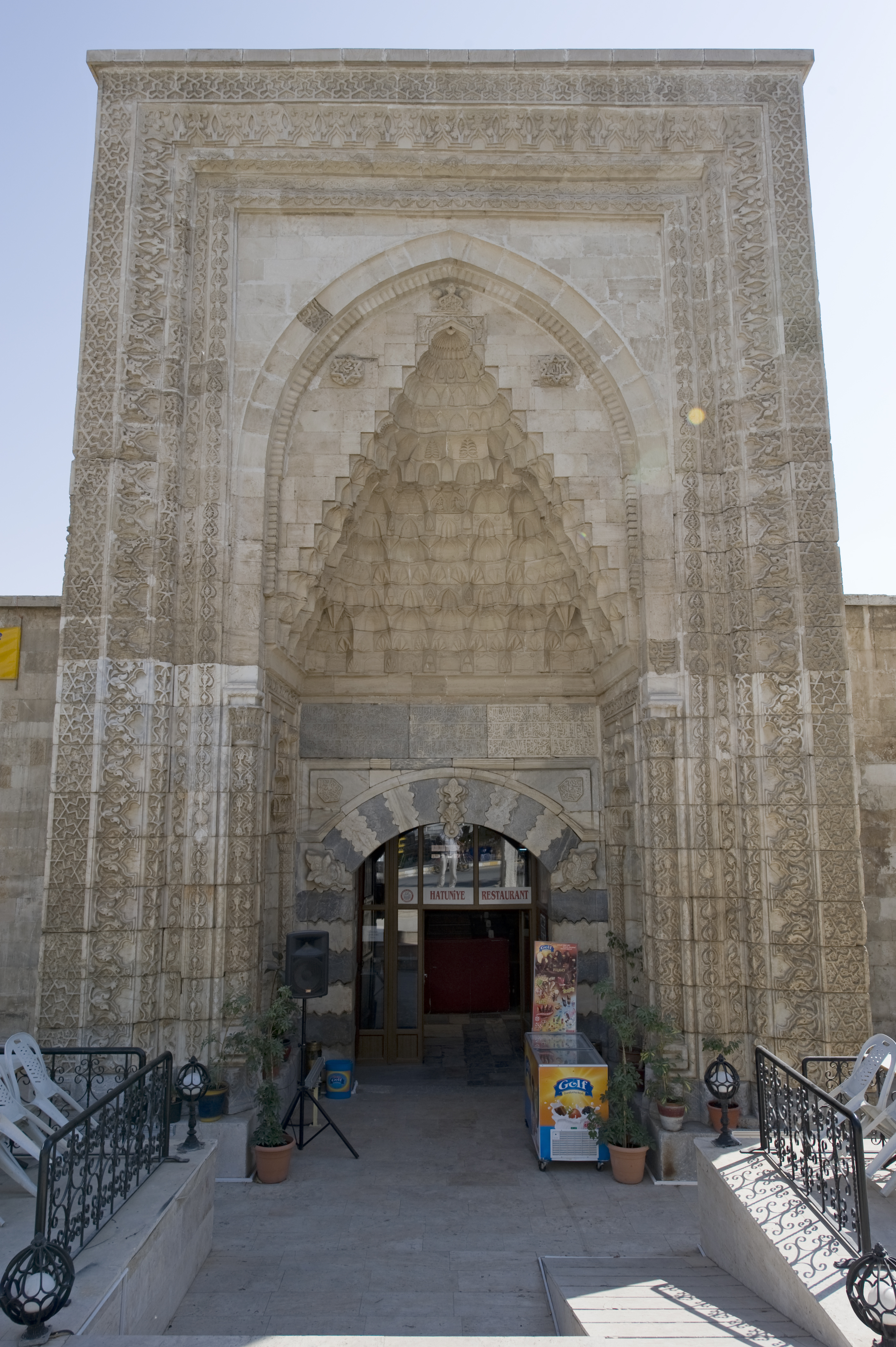

Religion
- Affiliation: Islam

Location
- Location: Karaman, Karaman Province, Turkey

Architecture
- Architect: Numanoğlu Hoca Ahmed
- Type: Civil
- Style: Islamic, Ottoman architecture
- Completed: c. 1382

Hatuniye Medrese (Turkish: Hatuniye Medresesi), is a historical medrese in Karaman, Turkey, built in the 14th century. The like-named Hatuniye Külliyesi in Tokat is a century younger, and refers to another woman.

== History ==
Ottoman Sultan Murat Hüdavendigar's daughter Sultan Hatun, wife of Karamanoğlu Alaattin Bey, ordered the construction in 1382. The architect of the Medrese is Numanoğlu Hoca Ahmed (Hodja Ahmed, son of Numan), according to the kitabe (inscription) of the building.

The building is made of cut stone from around Karaman and the main gate (portal) from marble.

== Gallery ==
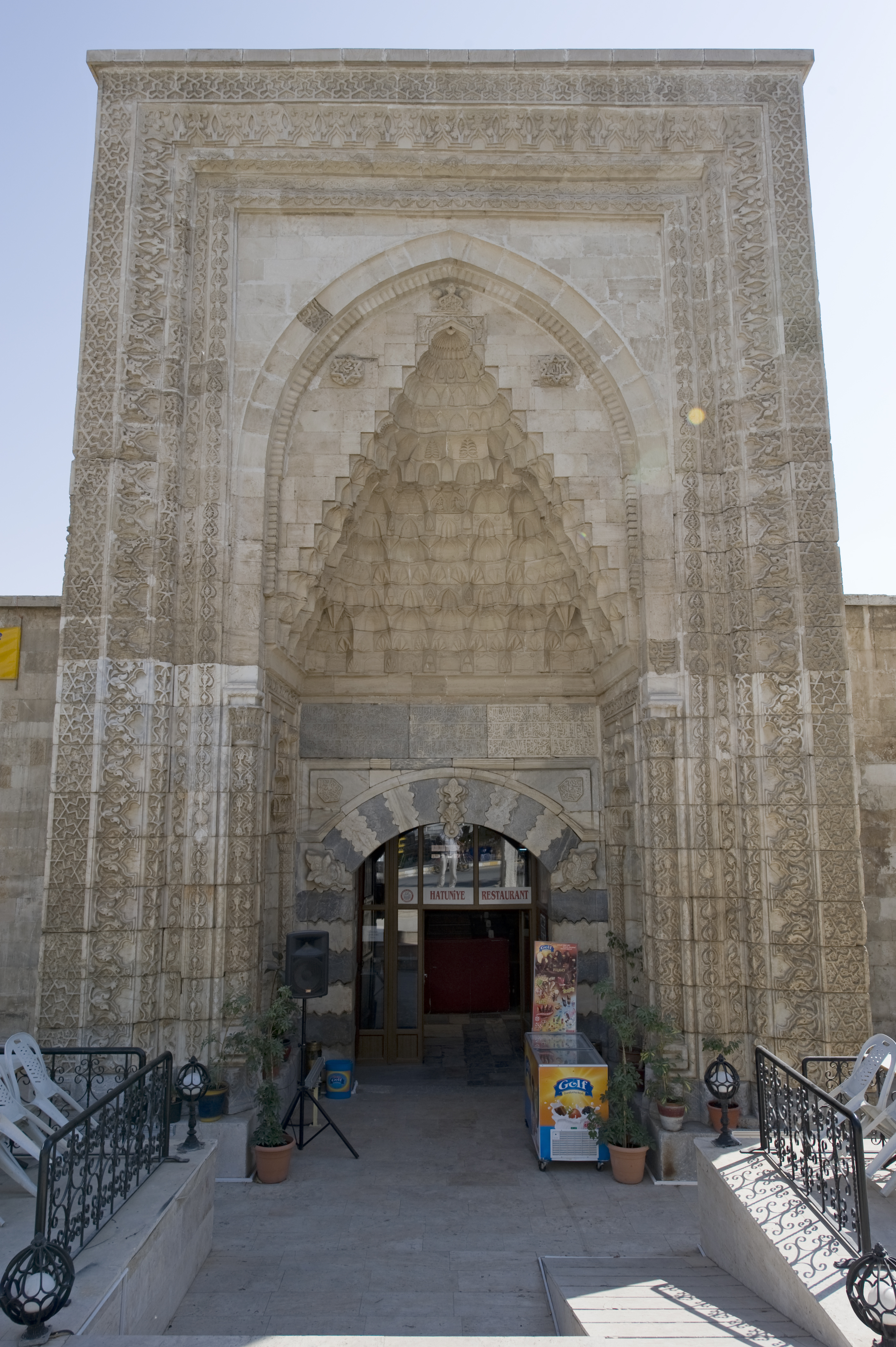
Hatuniye Medrese ‘Taşkapı’ (stone gatehouse)

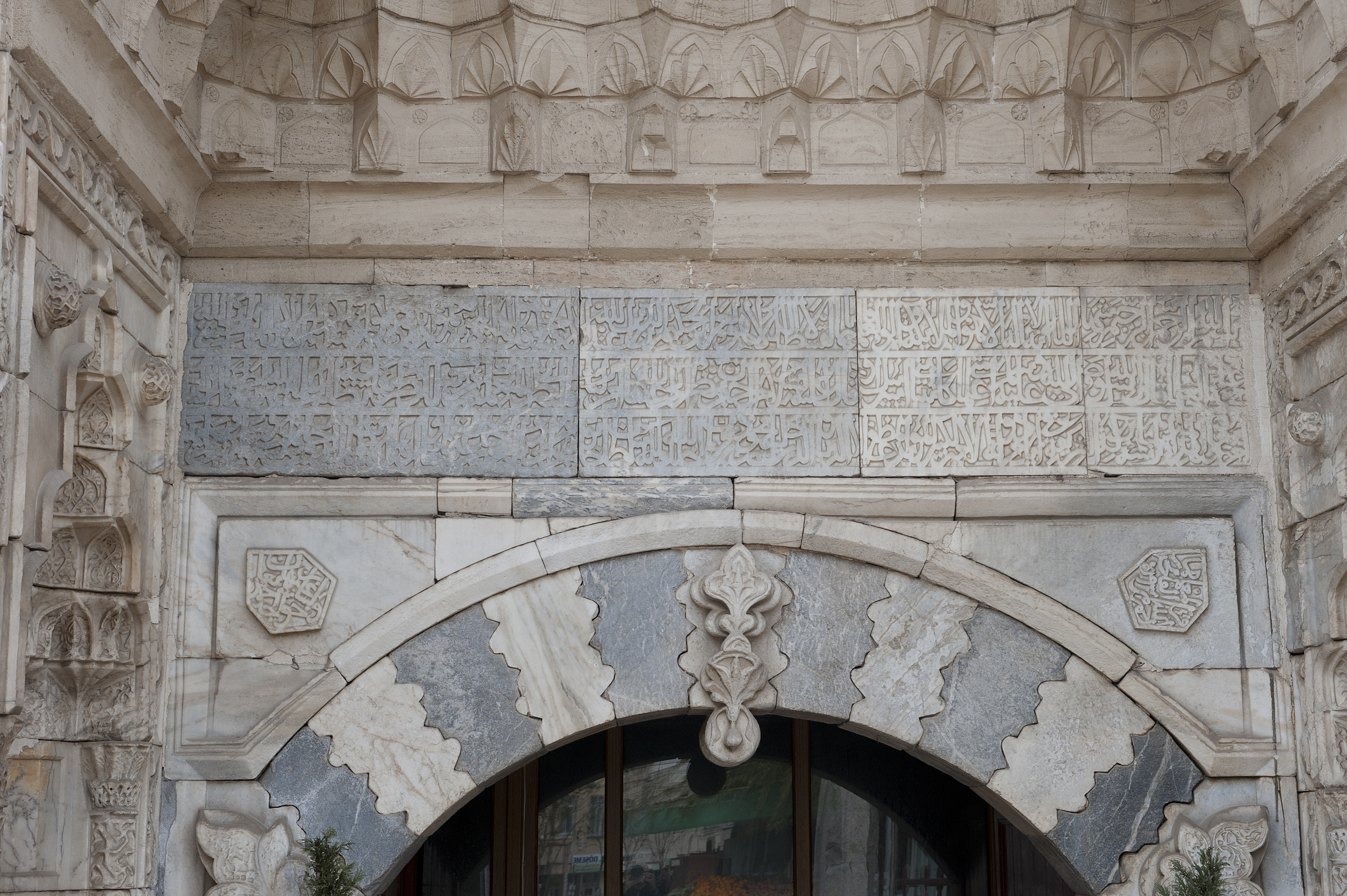
Hatuniye Medrese Detail ‘Taşkapı’ (stone gatehouse)

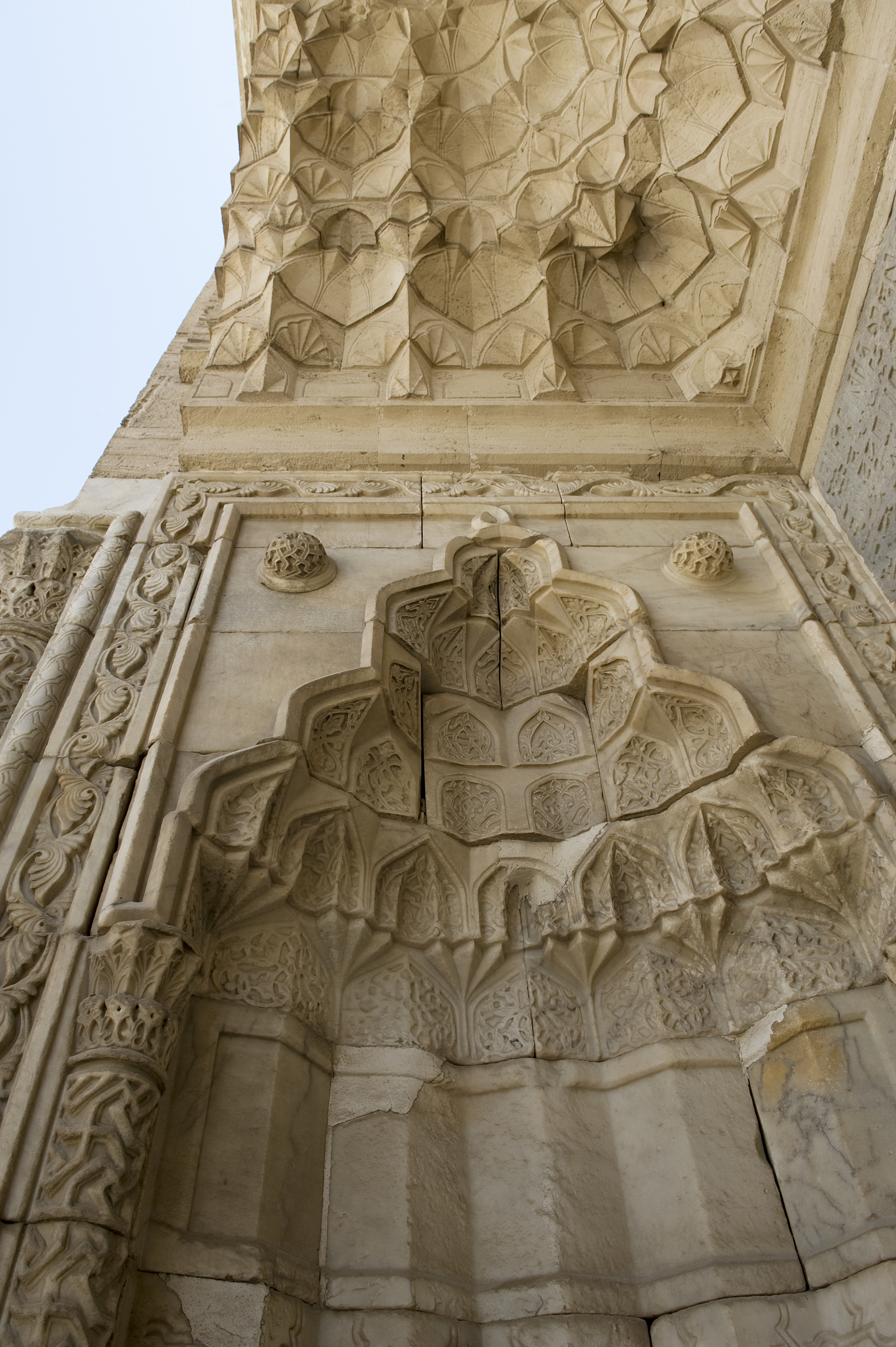
Hatuniye Medrese Detail ‘Taşkapı’ (stone gatehouse)

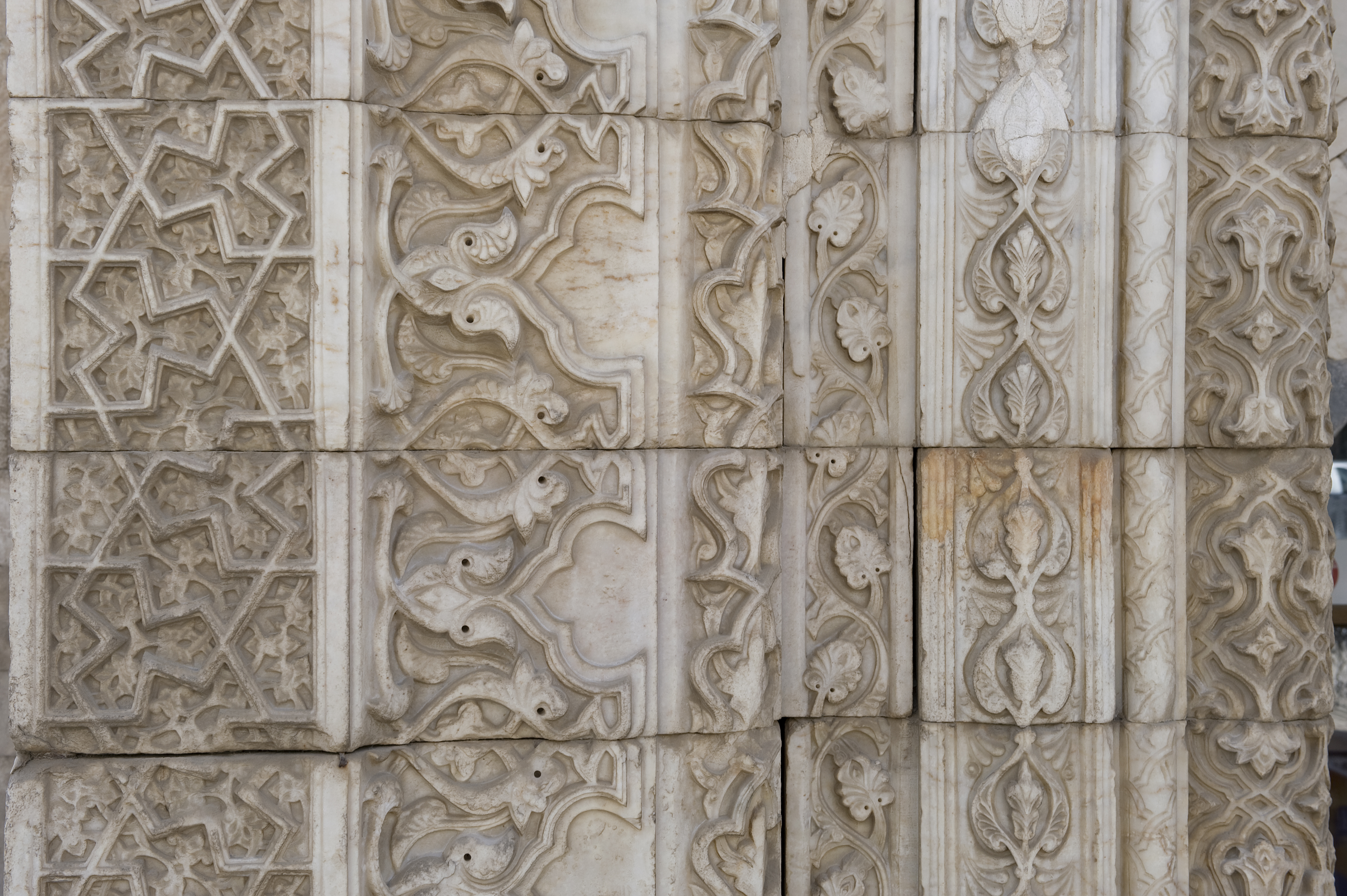
Hatuniye Medrese Detail ‘Taşkapı’ (stone gatehouse)

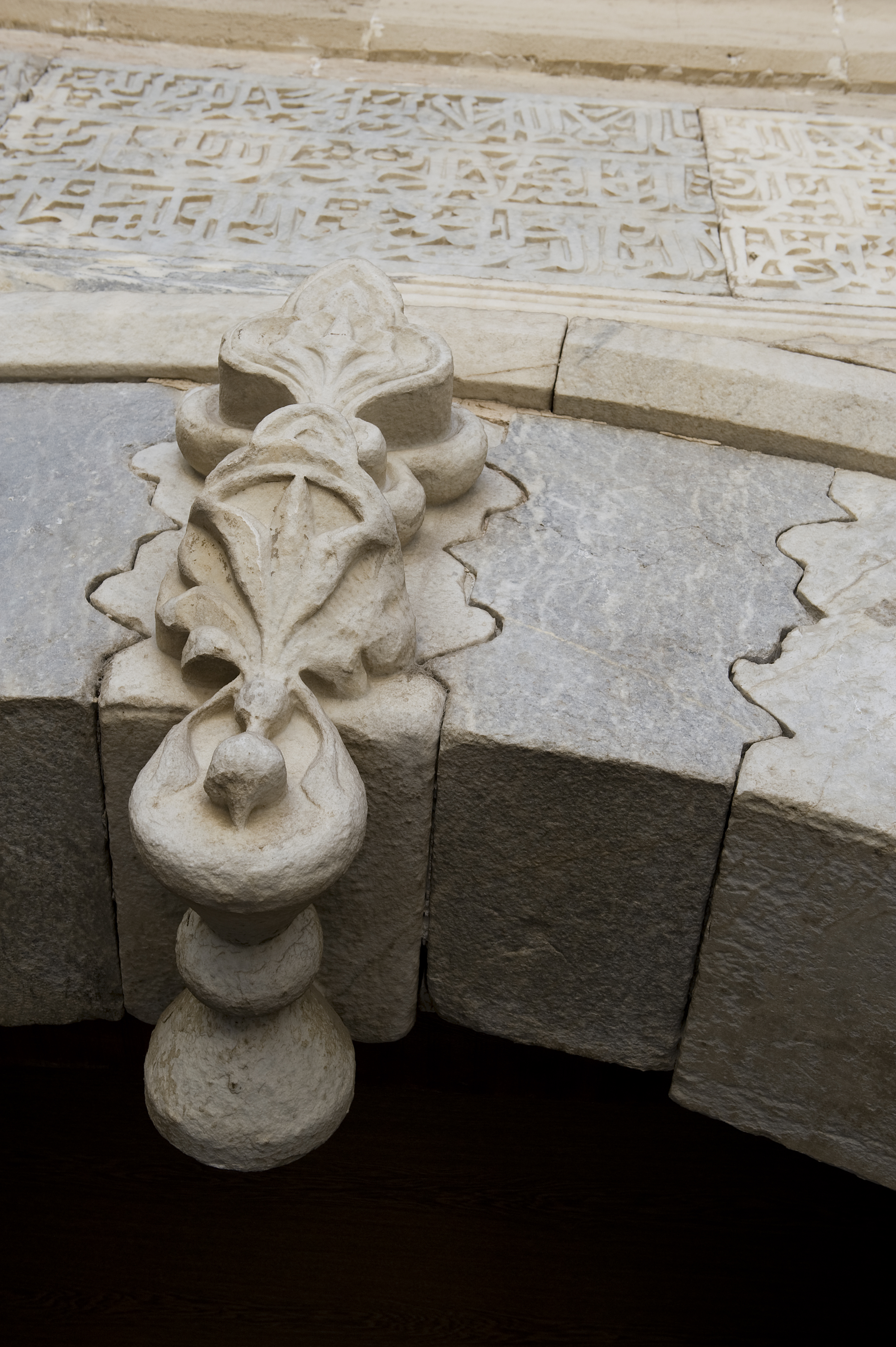
Hatuniye Medrese Detail ‘Taşkapı’ (stone gatehouse)

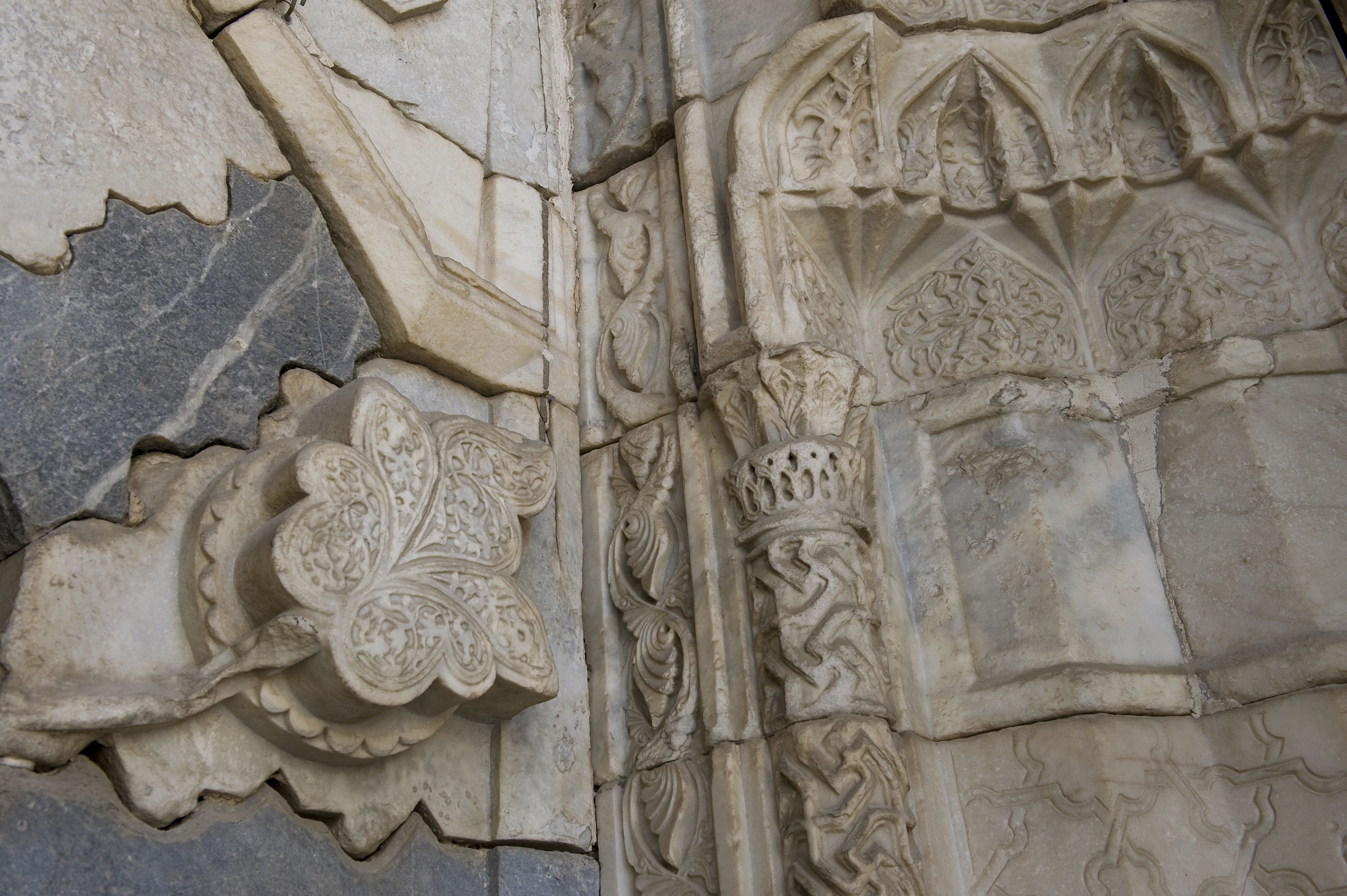
Hatuniye Medrese Detail ‘Taşkapı’ (stone gatehouse)

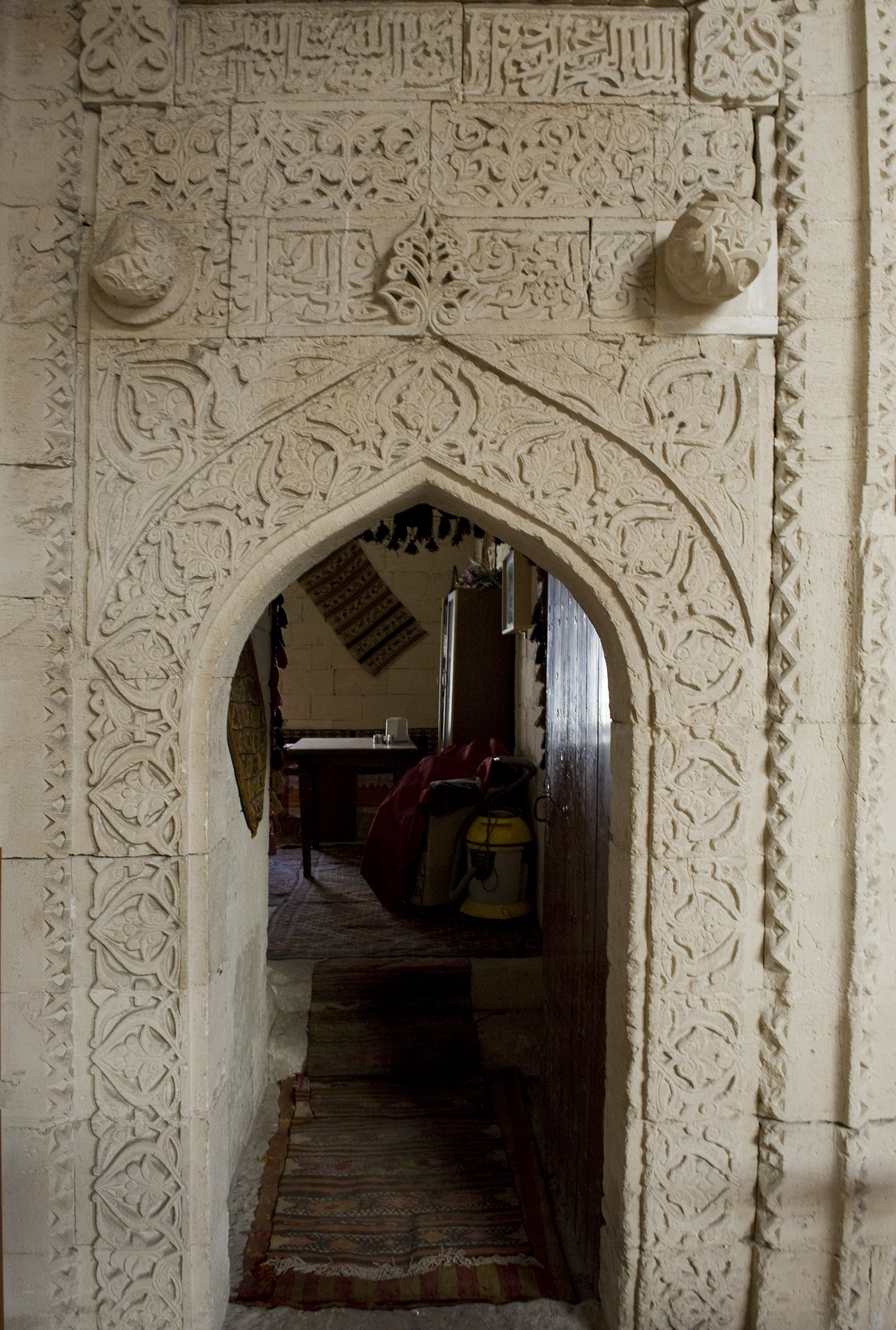
Hatuniye Medrese Detail door to one of the cells inside

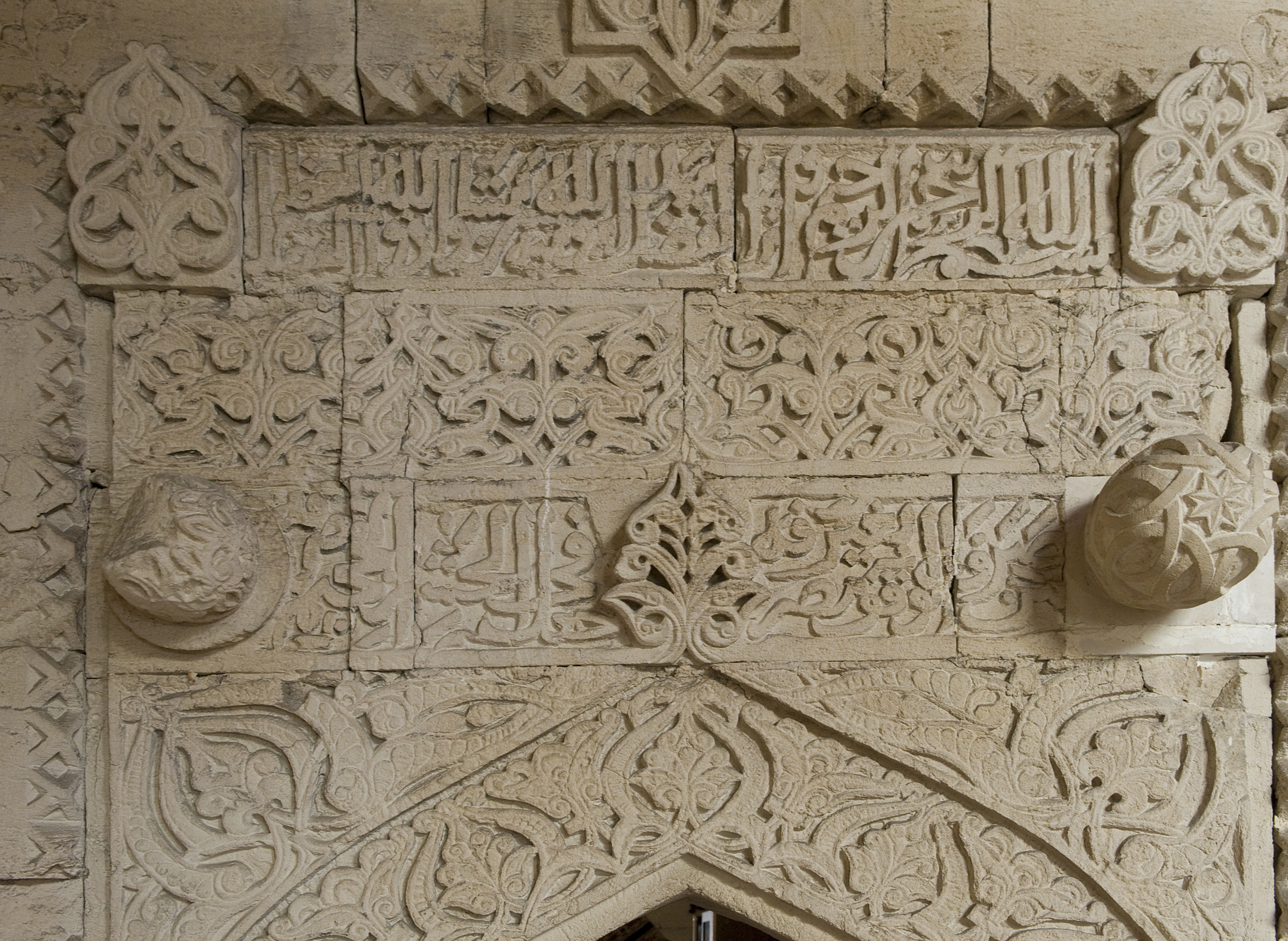
Hatuniye Medrese Detail door to one of the cells inside

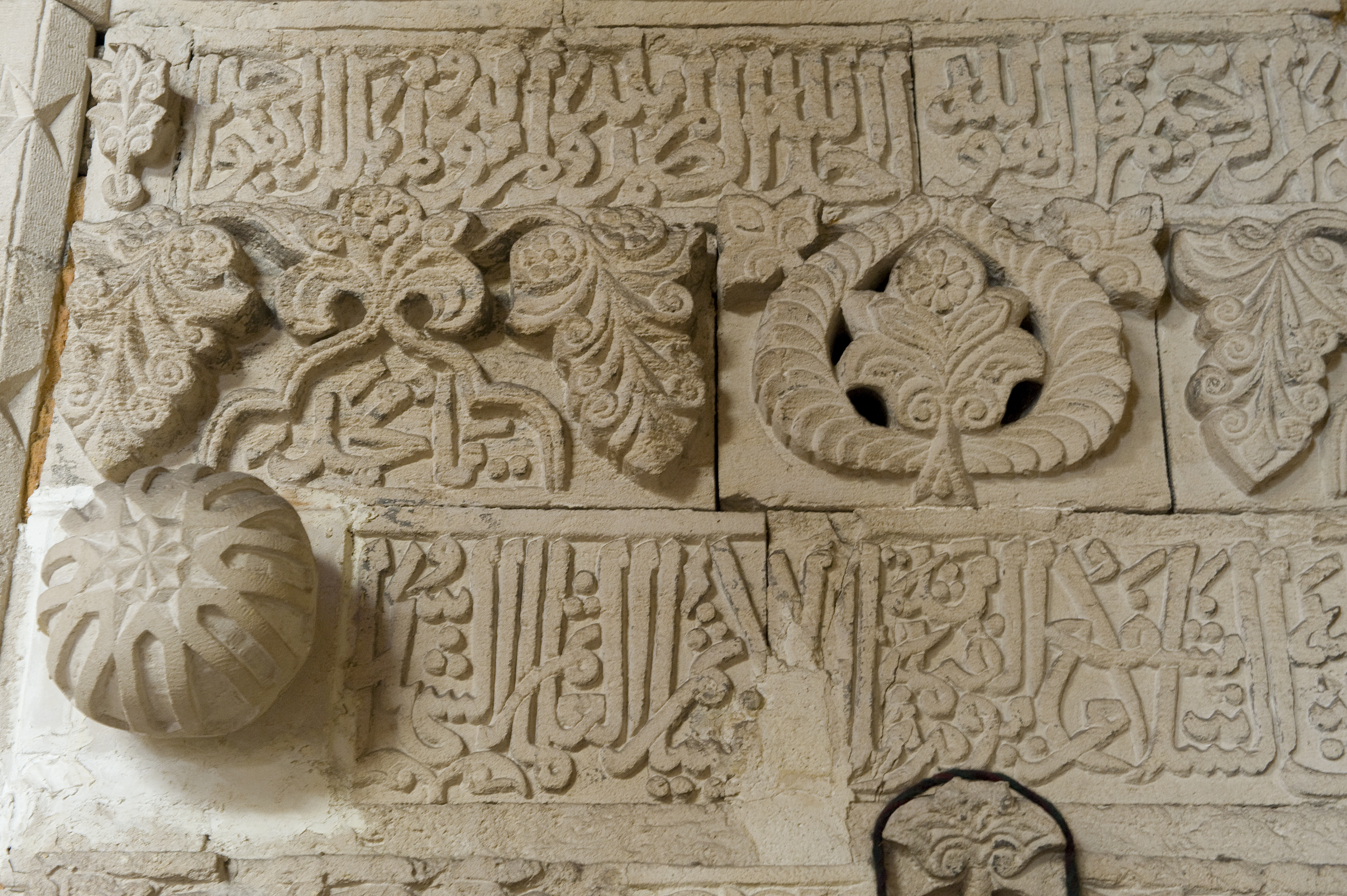
Hatuniye Medrese Detail door to one of the cells inside
