= Çeşme Museum =

Turkish museum

- Çeşme Müzesi
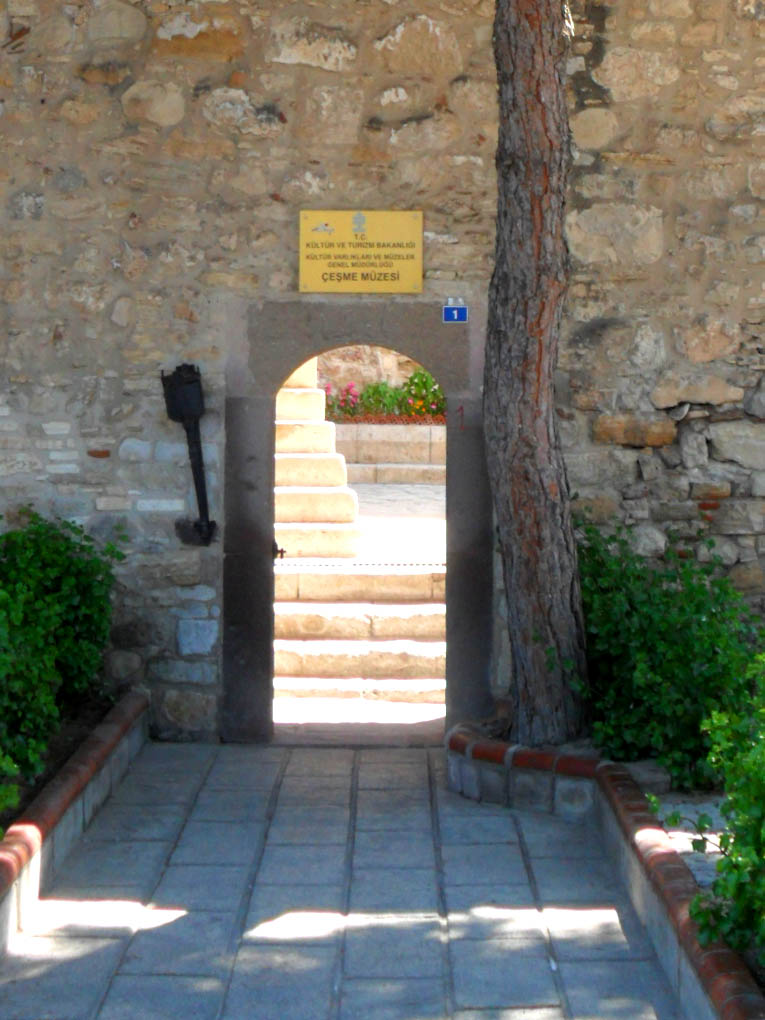
- Museum entrance

- Çeşme Museum
- Established: 1984; 42 years ago
- Location: Çeşme Kalesi, Çeşme, Turkey
- Coordinates: 38°19′25″N 26°18′11″E
- Type: Archaeology
- Owner: Ministry of Culture and Tourism

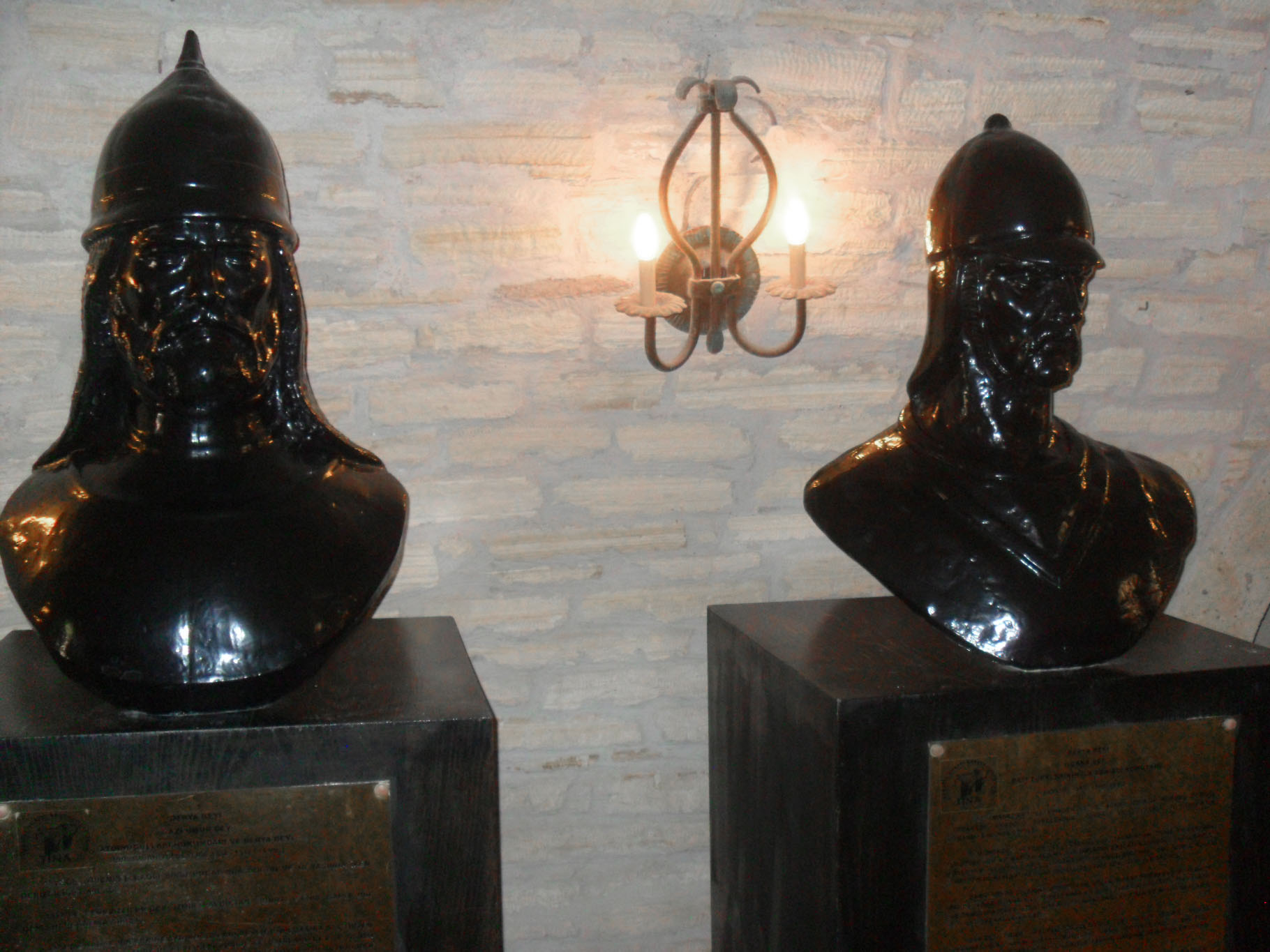
Busts of Çaka and Umur, two medieval Turkish admirals

Çeşme Museum is a general interest museum in Çeşme ilçe (district) of İzmir Province, Turkey.

== Location ==
It lies at 38°19′25″N 26°18′11″E within Çeşme Castle. The Cezayirli Gazi Hasan Paşa Monument is just in front of the museum and the Aegean Sea coast is about 60 metres (200 ft) to the west.

== History ==
The castle was commissioned by Sultan Bayezid II of the Ottoman Empire in 1502. In 1965, the museum was established as a weapons museum, but high moisture caused some rusting in the metallic parts of the weapons and the weapons were transferred to other museums. Beginning in 1984, the museum was redesigned as a general purpose museum.

== Exhibited items ==
In one hall items from the Archaic, Roman and Byzantine eras such as terracotta figurines, oil lamps and pottery are exhibited. One hall is reserved for objects from rescue excavations of Idırı (Erythrae) such as terracotta figurines, silver and copper coins and amphorae. Another hall commemorates the Battle of Çeşme, an 18th-century battle fought in the bay of Çeşme. In this hall maps, posters, flags, medals as well as objects from the sunken Russian flagship are exhibited.
