= Çeşme Castle =

Castle in Turkey

- İzmir Province, Turkey
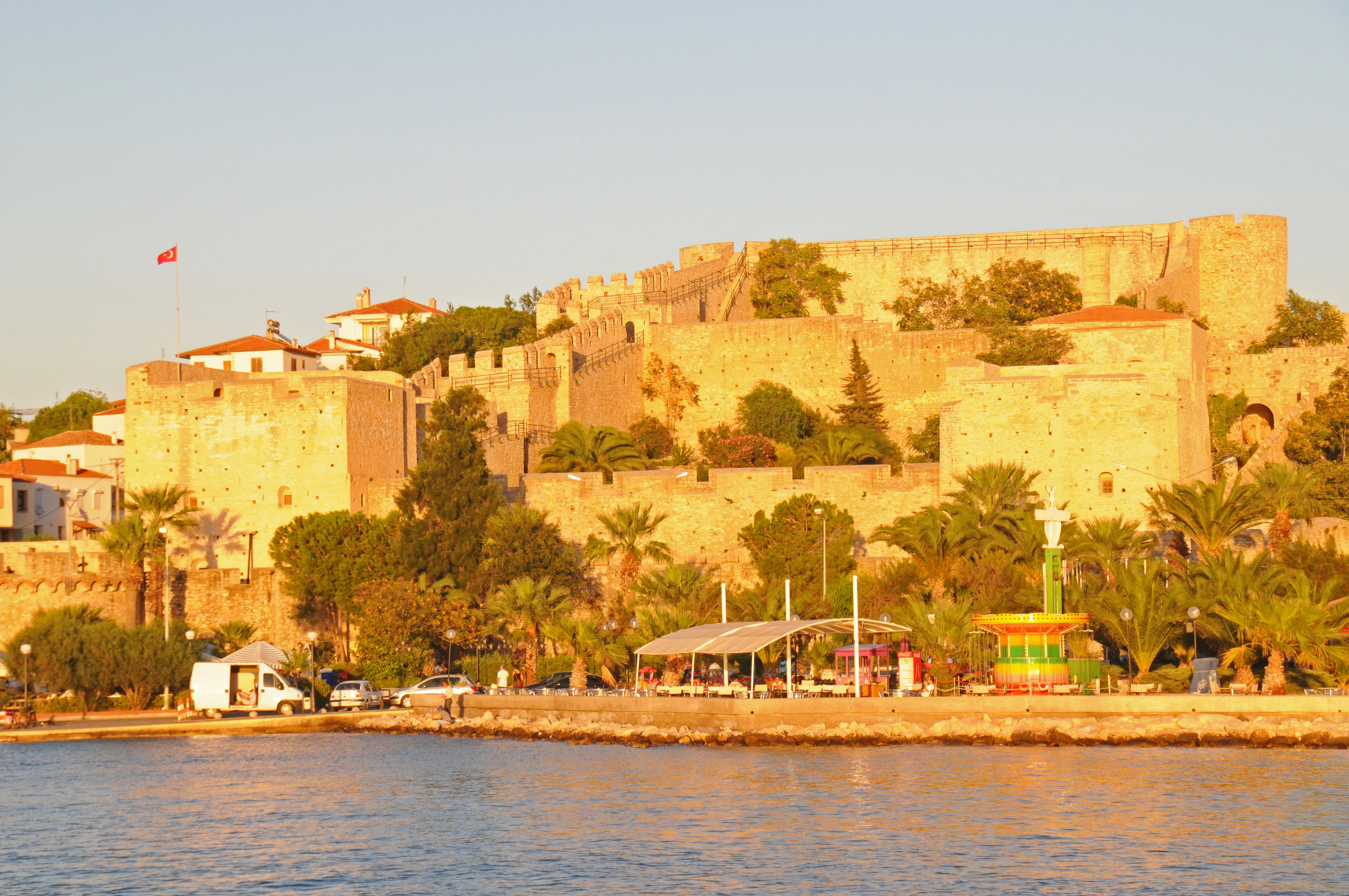
- Çeşme Castle from the west

Site information
- Type: Fortress
- Open to the public: Yes
- Condition: Main room still standing.

Location
- Location within Turkey
- Coordinates: 38.3236°N 26.3036°E

Site history
- Built by: Ottoman Empire
- Demolished: Mostly standing
- Battles/wars: Çeşme Battle

Çeşme Castle is a historic castle in Çeşme, Turkey.

== Location ==
The castle is located in Çeşme ilçe (district) of İzmir Province at 38°19′25″N 26°18′13″E. Its distance to İzmir is 35 kilometres (22 mi). Cezayirli Gazi Hasan Paşa Monument is in front of the castle and Çeşme Museum is a situated in the castle.

== History ==
During the Growth of the Ottoman Empire, Çeşme was attacked twice by the Venetians in 1472 and in 1501. The castle was built as a precaution against further attacks. It was built in 1508 during the reign of the Ottoman sultan Bayezit II. Its commissioner was Mir Haydar, the governor of Aidin Vilayet. It was originally a seaside castle but because of the alluvial deposits it is now slightly inland. The castle became a Tentative World Heritage Site in 2020.

== Castle and the activities ==
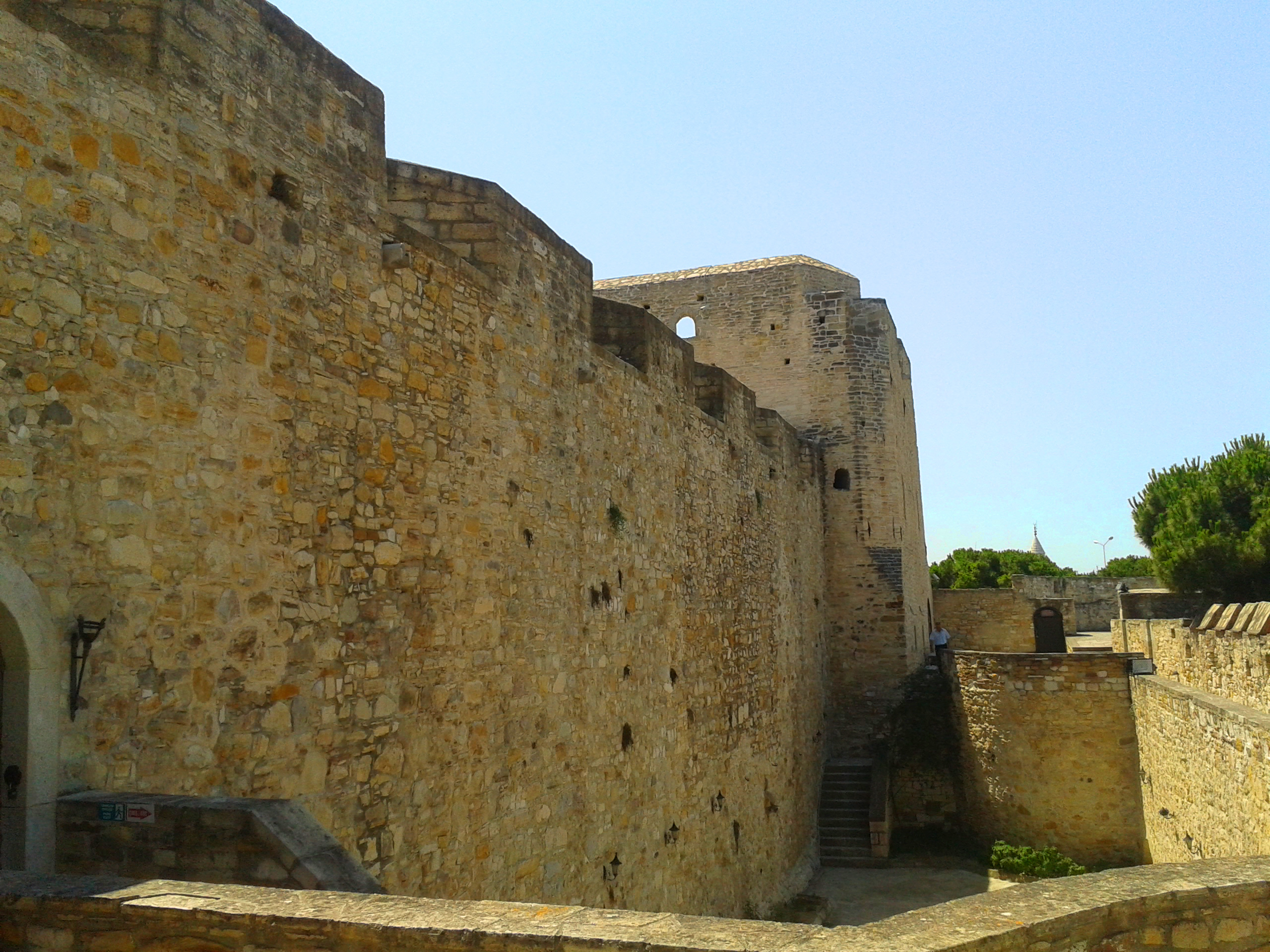
Çeşme Castle from the north

The rectangular plan castle has moats on three sides six bastions. It is used as a festival center. Both Çeşme International Music festival and Çeşme festival are held in the castle.
