= Çandarlı Castle =

Castle in Çandarlı, Turkey

- Çandarlı, İzmir, Turkey in Turkey
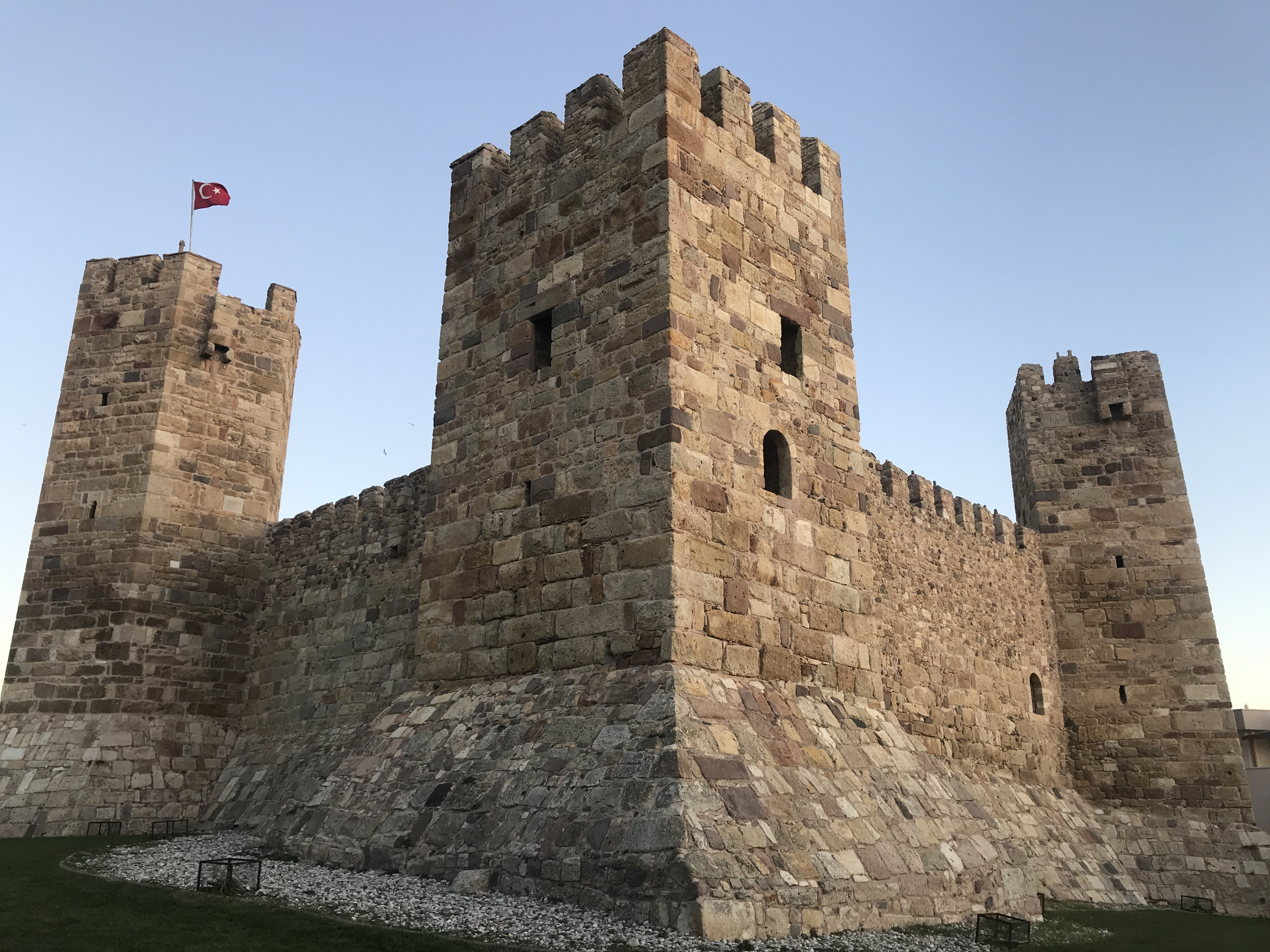
- Çandarlı Castle

Site information
- Type: Castle

Location
- Location within Turkey
- Coordinates: 38.9338°N 26.9337°E

Site history
- Built: 6th century BC

Çandarlı Castle (Turkish: Çandarlı Kalesi) is a fortification in the coastal Çandarlı neighborhood of Dikili district in İzmir Province.

== History ==
The castle was built in the 6th century BC to protect the ancient settlement Pitane. The city was the leading port during the Kingdom of Pergamon (282–129 BC). Later, it became an important port city during the Roman, Byzantine, Seljuk and Ottoman ages It gained its current appearance in the 14th century when the Republic of Genoa (c. 1100–1805) captured Phocaea (today Foça).

The ruined castle was rebuilt in the 15th century by order of Grand Vizier Çandarlı Halil Pasha after the region was conquered during the reign of Ottoman sultan Murad II (r. 1421–1444, 1446–1451). The last restoration work started in 2009, and completed in 2014.

It is registered as immovable cultural property that needs to be protected within the protected historical area.

In 2013, it was included in the UNESCO World Heritage Tentative List under the name "Castles and Walled Settlements on the Genoese Trade Route from the Mediterranean Sea to the Black Sea".

== Overview ==
Overlooking the nearby peninsula, the castle is situated on rock ground, which is sloping in the east-west direction, close to the peninsula's land connection. Stretching over 2,230 m^{2} (24,000 sq ft) area, it features five towers, walls with battlements and a gate with inscription over it featuring a faint text of Qur'an verses from the Al-Fath Surah (Conquest chapter). Excavations inside the courtyard revealed wall remains, floors at different levels and a cistern from the Byzantium (667 BC–330 AD) era.

After long-lasting restorations, the castle was opened to the public in March 2016.
