= Leuconia (Ionia) =

Town formerly located in ancient Ionia

Leuconia or Leukonia (Ancient Greek: Λευκώνια) was a town of ancient Ionia, about the possession of which the Chians were involved in a war with Erythrae. It was, according to Plutarch, was a colony of Chios.

Its site is unlocated.
