= Ekrem Akurgal =

Turkish archaeologist (1911–2002)

Prof. Dr. Ekrem Akurgal Dr. h.c. mult.
- Born: March 30, 1911; Tulkarm, Beirut Vilayet, Palestine, Ottoman Empire
- Died: November 1, 2002 (aged 91); İzmir, Turkey
- Education: Istanbul High School for Boys; University of Berlin
- Occupation: Academic
- Known for: Research on ancient civilizations in Anatolia
- Spouse: Meral Akurgal
- Awards: Great Cross of Merit with Star (1979); Goethe Medal (1982); Commendatore of the Order of Merit of the Republic (1987); French Légion d'honneur Officier (1987); METU Parlar Science Award (1996)

Ekrem Akurgal (March 30, 1911 – November 1, 2002) was a Turkish archaeologist. During a career that spanned more than fifty years, he conducted definitive research in several sites along the western coast of Anatolia such as Phokaia (Foça), Pitane (Çandarlı), Erythrai (Ildırı) and old Smyrna (Bayraklı Höyük, the original site of the city of Smyrna before the city's move to another spot across the Gulf of İzmir).

== Biography ==
He was born on March 30, 1911, in the town of Tulkarm in the Beirut Vilayet of the Ottoman Empire (today a Palestinian city in the West Bank), where his mother's family owned a large farm. He descended from a family of Ottoman intellectuals and religious men, several of whose members had assumed the office of mufti, the highest title of the Islamic clergy in a given region, for the Ottoman province of Herzegovina. His family moved back to Istanbul when he was two years old. For some time, they resided in another family farm, this time near Akyazı. He received his first education from his father's sister and her husband, who taught literature in Darülfünun.

Akurgal graduated in 1931 from Istanbul High School for Boys and, having earned a state scholarship, went to the University of Berlin in Germany to study archaeology. In a Frankfurter Allgemeine Zeitung made in 1990, the interviewer was to remark that, now and then, his German was still unmistakably tainted with Berlinerisch.

In 1957, he became a professor in the University of Ankara. He worked mainly in the Aegean Region, starting the research on Phokaia (Foça), Pitane (Çandarlı), Erythrai (Ildırı) and old Smyrna (Bayraklı tumulus). He published numerous books on ancient Greek, Hittite and other ancient civilizations of Anatolia.

Settled in İzmir since the seventies to pursue his work on the nearby sites with more effectiveness, Akurgal died on November 1, 2002, in İzmir. His work and legacy is being carried on by his wife, Meral Akurgal, an accomplished archaeologist herself and his closest assistant in his lifetime.

== Awards ==
- 1961 Honorary Doctorate Bordeaux University, France
- 1972 German Great Cross of Merit with Star
- 1981 German Goethe Medal
- 1981 Turkish Republic Ministry of Culture Grand Award
- 1986 Premio Internazionale "I Cavalli d'Oro di San Marco", Italy
- 1987 Italian Commendatore of the Order of Merit of the Republic
- 1987 French Légion d'honneur Officier
- 1989 Honorary Doctorate University of Athens, Greece
- 1990 Honorary Doctorate University of Lecce, Italy
- 1990 Honorary Doctorate Anadolu University, Turkey

== Bibliography ==
- Cyril Mango, Ekrem Akurgal, and Richard Ettinghausen. The Treasures of Turkey: The earliest civilizations of Anatolia Byzantium the Islamic Period. (1966), Editions d'Art Albert Skira, Geneva, 253 pp.
- Ekrem Akurgal (2002). Ancient Civilisations and Ruins of Turkey. Kegan Paul. ISBN 978-0-7103-0776-7.

== See also ==
- Legion of Honour
- Legion of Honour Museum
- List of Legion of Honour recipients by name (A)
- List of foreign recipients of Legion of Honour by name
- List of foreign recipients of the Legion of Honour by country
- List of foreign recipients of the Legion of Honour by decade
