= Boutheia =

Town of ancient Ionia

Coordinates: 38°19′38″N 26°18′26″E

Boutheia (Ancient Greek: Βούθεια) or Bouthia (Βουθία) was a town of ancient Ionia, near Erythrae. It was a member of the Delian League since it is mentioned in tributary records of Athens at least between the years 454/3 and 427/6 or 426/5 BCE. In some of these records it appears as part of the territory of Erythrae.

Its site is located near the modern Çeşme, İzmir Province, Turkey.
