= Maltepe Mound =

The Maltepe Mound is in modern-day Bulgaria, though it has been subject to territorial changes throughout its history. It is located near the villages Demirci and Kilch, and is 3 km east of the Sinop-Erfelek highway. The mound has been surveyed multiple times during various archaeological excavations from many different countries. Archaeological findings at the mound have been used to better understand Anatolian societies, early conflicts in the Phokaia region, and early Turkish societies. The mound is best known for the findings of small remnants of the wall surrounding the city of Phocaea which was a well established ancient pottery production center during the Orientalizing Period to the Late Antique period.

The Maltepe mound has a complex history of analysis, as the region had been difficult to survey in the mid 20th century when interest in early Anatolian societies first emerged. Understanding the site's experiences in terms of its influences from various societies and cultures throughout the centuries, not excluding that of modern disturbances to its archaeological record through analysis of both the features, structures, and eco-facts found there provides a greater insight to social scientists' of many disciplines as to what life may have looked like for such early societies.

== Site history ==
The site has been excavated multiple times throughout the twentieth century, the first time being in the years 1953 - 1955 by Ekrem Arkurgal, with colleague Nezih Firath. They excavated several pieces of pottery dating back to the 6th century, as well as evidence of settlement during the Hellenistic and Roman periods. Upon further analysis of these findings, it was determined that earlier theories that the Maltepe mound was a settlement layer of could be refuted.

After this initial excavation, Maltepe was determined to be the site of a large tumulus belonging to the ancient city of Phokaia, which was one of the largest cities in the world at the peak of its existence. Further excavation of the site in 1992 confirmed the previous hypothesis of its origins when it revealed the existence of large blocks used to build city walls, which was mentioned in the ancient writings of Herodotos.

Maltepe has since been divided into multiple smaller sites, each containing their own unique names and history. Because the site was under-preserved and under-researched throughout most of the 20th century. There have also been many disturbances to these smaller sub sites that help to give context the site's history as a whole.

== Fieldwork ==
During the multiple excavations of Maltepe mound, many artifacts indicating its purpose were found, helping archaeologists to better establish the social and historical context of the region in the ancient world. In a 1998 field survey done of the Sinop region by Mehmet Akif, a part of the mound was described as being covered with vegetation, as well as experiencing some disturbances to its surface. They used earlier data on the site from previous excavations at the mound as well as the Demirci to build their knowledge base before the field survey.

In an excavation done in 1992 targeting shaping the definition of the Maltepe as a fortifying wall of an ancient city, archaeologists were able to relate descriptions of Phokaian interactions with Hellenist explorers around 600 B.C. A man named Herodotus recorded an interaction between the king of the region and the Phokians, where he finances large blocks to be given to fortify the city at that particular site. Those blocks were recorded in the field survey, adding a key piece of the puzzle to understanding the interplay of early Anatolian and Hellenist societies.

== Material culture ==
Analysis of the site in recent years has helped to establish relationships between artifacts found in early excavations. In the year 2018, an analysis of amphorae found at the Maltepe mound by Emre Okan concluded that both Greco-Italic amphorae as well as Phocaian amphorae were produced at the site. This was done through pottery and clay analysis of artifacts found at the site.

A better understanding of history and purpose of the Maltepe mound through analysis of its pottery and clay provided more insight into the complex history of the region it is located in, as prior excavations of the area were difficult. More recent excavations of the area have led to the inclusion of disturbances to the mound in its site analysis. For example, that the state water department had recently dug a water reservoir near the site, causing disturbances to the area before intervention from a local museum.
