= Helos (Ionia) =

Town of ancient Ionia

Coordinates: 38°34′27″N 26°21′41″E

Helos (Ancient Greek: Ἕλος) was a town of ancient Ionia, near Erythrae.

Its site is tentatively located near the modern Denizgiren.
