= Ilıca, Çeşme =

Ilıca
- Neighbourhood
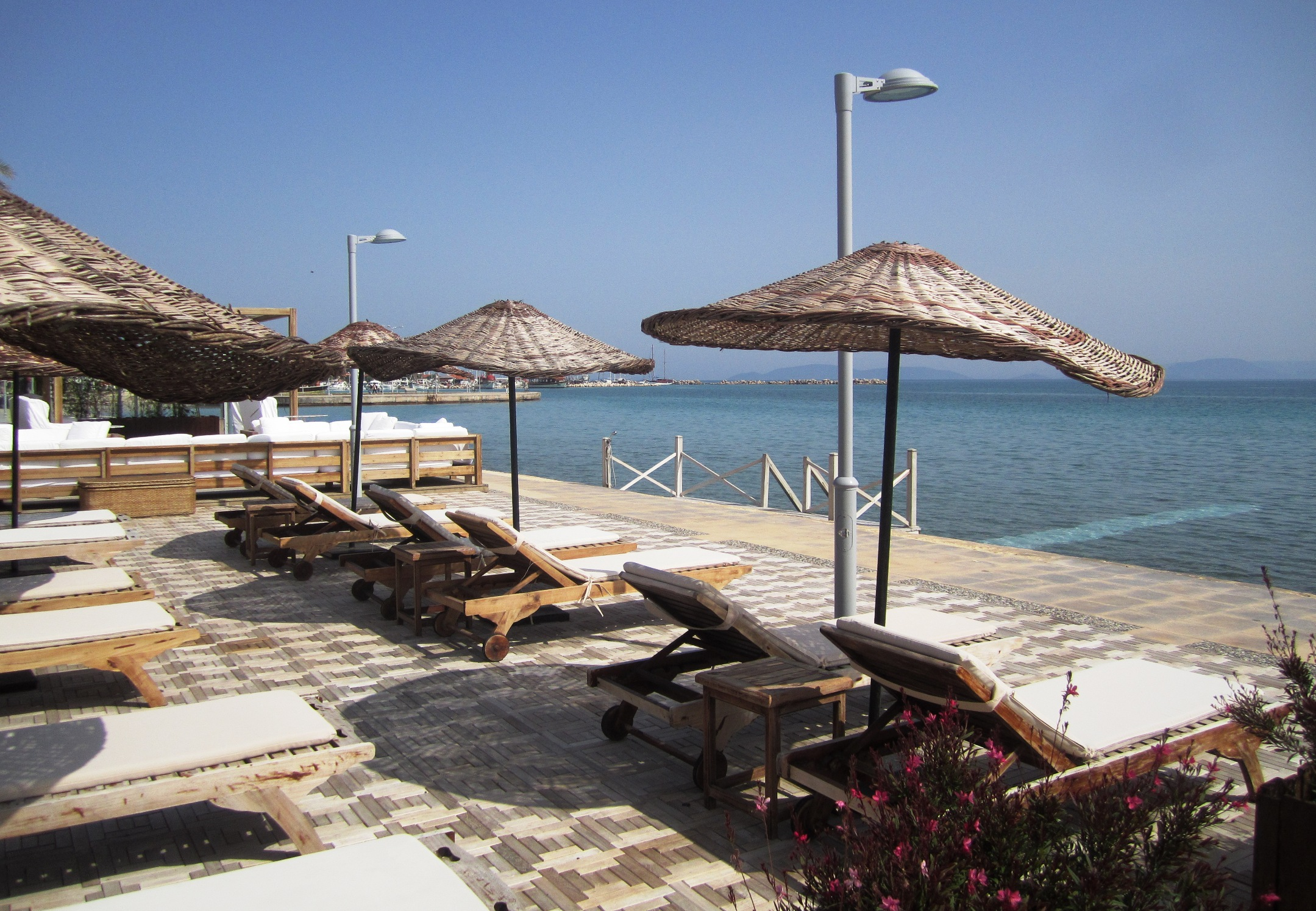
- Beach of Ilıca

- Location within Turkey Location within İzmir
- Coordinates: 38°18′31″N 26°21′22″E
- Country: Turkey
- Province: İzmir
- District: Çeşme
- Population (2022): 1,189
- Time zone: UTC+3 (TRT)
- Area code: 0232

Ilıca is a neighbourhood in the municipality and district of Çeşme, İzmir Province, Turkey. Its population is 1,189 (2022). It is a large resort area in the extreme western tip of Turkey. A township apart in practically all its aspects, Ilıca administratively depends the municipality of the district center of Çeşme, at a distance of 5 km to the west.

Ilıca started out as a settlement towards the end of the 19th century, initially as a retreat for wealthy people, especially from İzmir, during summer holidays. Today, it is a popular destination for many. Its name makes reference to its famed thermal springs, some of which are in the sea. As the thermal waters come out of the sea bed and mix with the sea water adding minerals very close to the Ilica Beach, swimming at Ilica Beach is ideal for the skin. Ilica is also home to mud baths which is known to cure many illnesses such as rheumatism, metabolism illnesses and gynaecological diseases.

Mentioned by Pausanias and Charles Texier, Ilıca thermal springs are also notable in Turkey for having been the subject of the first scientifically based analysis in the Turkish language of a thermal spring, published in 1909 by Cemal Yusuf. By his time the thermal springs were well-known both internationally, scientific and journalistic literature having been published in French and in Greek, and across Ottoman lands, since the construction here of a still-standing yalı associated with Muhammad Ali of Egypt's son Tosun Pasha who had sought a cure in Ilıca before his premature death.

Ilıca also has a beach, about 1.5 km long, wind conditions which make Ilıca, together with the neighboring Alaçatı, an internationally prized location for windsurfing. A unique feature of Ilıca Beach is its shallow and warm waters allowing swimmers to wade up to 100 meters out to sea.

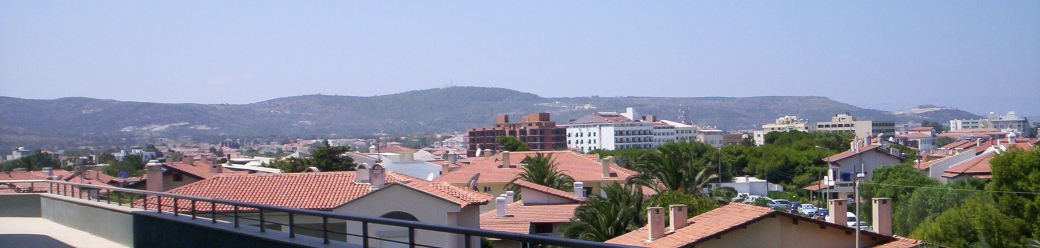
Looking southwest over Ilıca

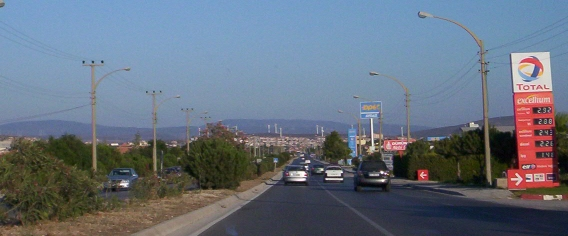
Ilıca seen from the highway from Çeşme to Izmir

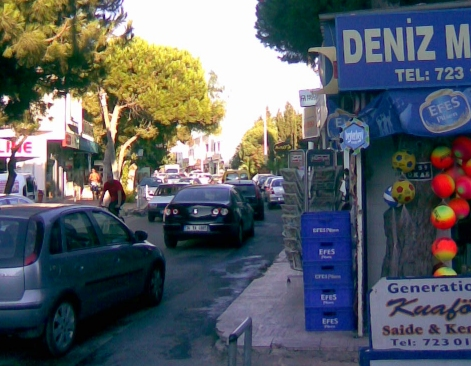
Traffic jam on Ilıca's shopping mile

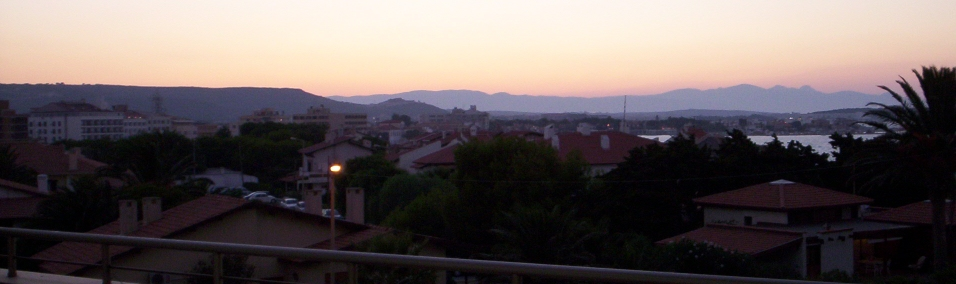
Sunset over Ilıca looking west towards Çeşme
