= Ildır =

Sea-side village in Çeşme, Turkey

- Neighbourhood
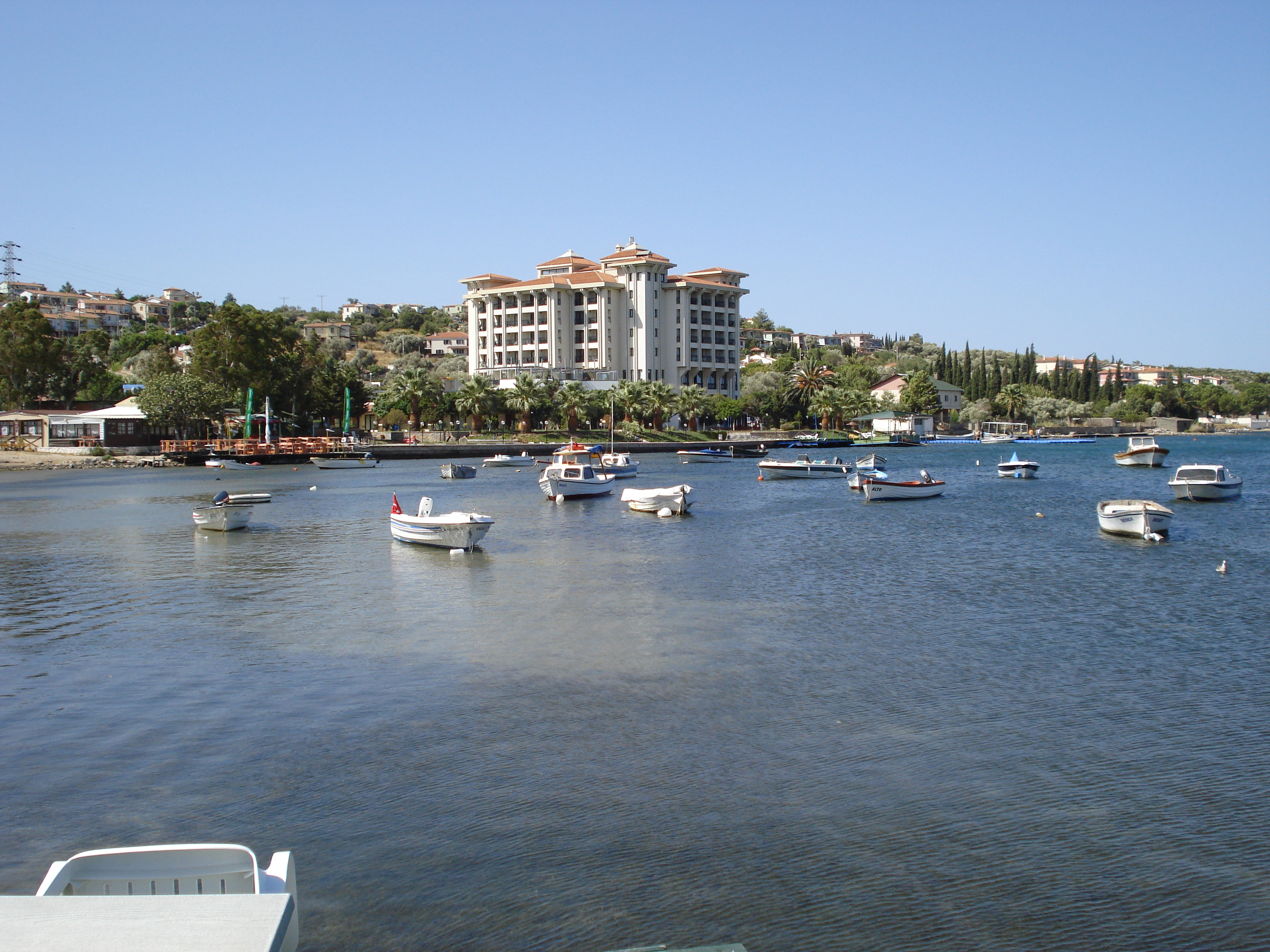
- A view of Ildır beach

- Location within Turkey Location within İzmir
- Coordinates: 38°23′2″N 26°28′34″E
- Country: Turkey
- Province: İzmir
- District: Çeşme
- Population (2022): 758
- Time zone: UTC+3 (TRT)
- Area code: 0232

Ildır is a neighbourhood in the municipality and district of Çeşme, İzmir Province, Turkey. Its population is 758 (2022). It is a picturesque sea-side village on the Aegean Sea coast, located about twenty-five kilometers north of Çeşme town, facing Chios.

The important Ancient Greek city of Erythrai was located here from the Hellenistic period, and throughout the ancient Roman and Byzantine periods. The ruins are situated within the modern-day village and the site was explored in depth in the 1960s by Professor Ekrem Akurgal, leading to valuable discoveries, but has since been somewhat neglected.

Despite being close to Çeşme, the village has not been affected by the tourism boom that has overtaken its administrative center, and a calm and introverted lifestyle prevails in the village, supplemented only by a number of summer-house owners and retirees, mostly from İzmir.
