= Athenais (seer) =

Prophetess from Asia Minor

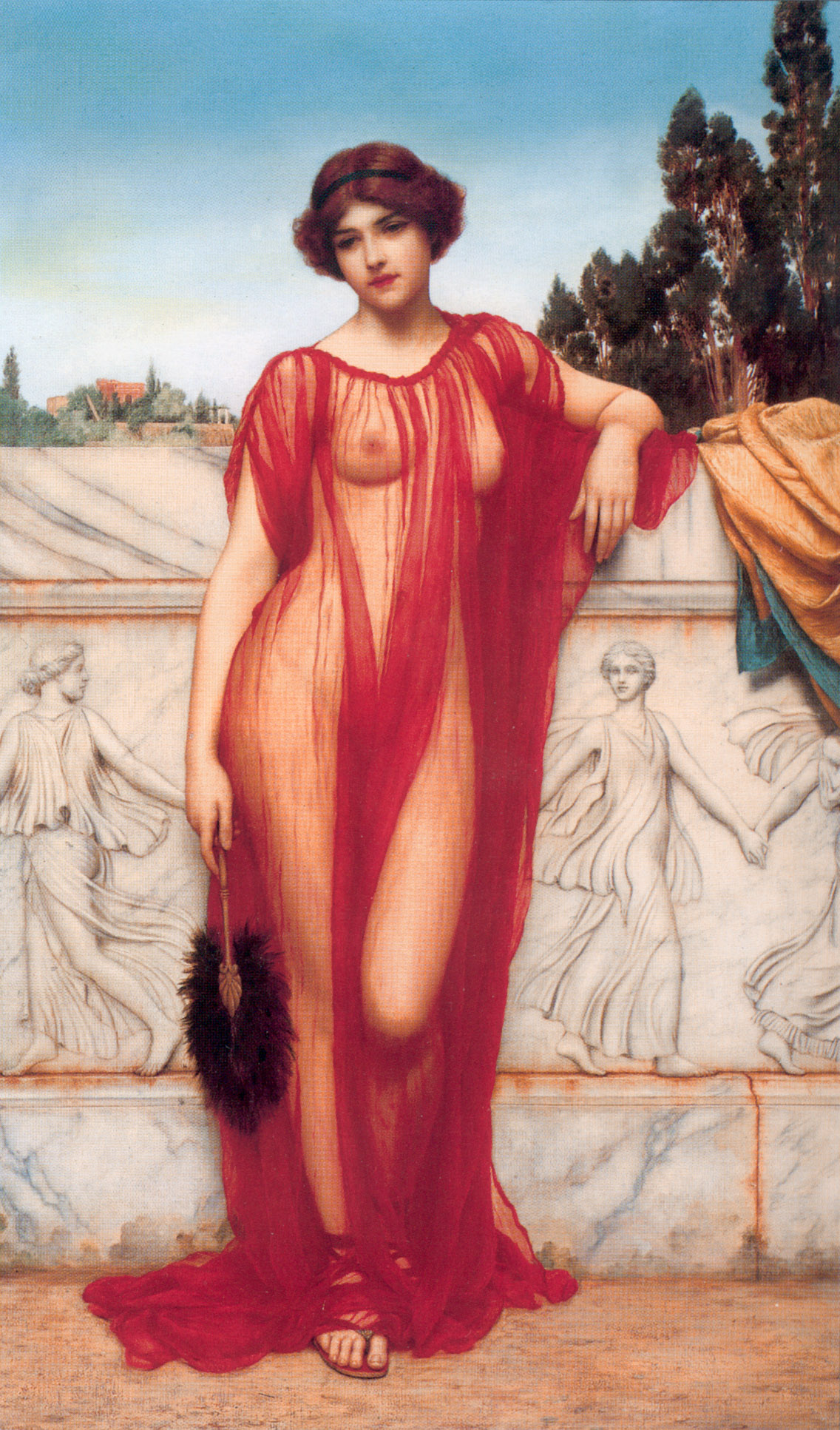
Athenais by John William Godward, 1908.

Athenais (Ancient Greek: Ἀθηναΐς) was a prophetess from Erythrae in Ionia, Asia Minor. She lived at the time of Alexander the Great. According to Strabo, Athenais was one of the oracles which claimed divine descent for Alexander the Great.
