= Naucrates (rhetorician) =

4th Century BC Greek rhetorician

Naucrates (Ancient Greek: Ναυκράτης) also known as Naucrates of Erythrae and Naucrates Erythraeus (Ἐρυθραίος Ναυκρατίτης) was a Greek rhetorician from Erythrae and Isocrates' disciple.

He is mentioned as one of the orators who competed (352 BC) for Artemisia's award for the best funeral oration delivered over Mausolus. He wrote on rhetoric. Cicero's incidental note of his writings suggests that he participated in and defended his master's technical improvement. Quintilian used the phrase στάσις in one of his treatises to describe the status or quaestio of a case in its most general aspect, and some considered him the creator of the term. As Isocrates created models for judicial and political orations, Naucrates provided templates (none of which survive) for funeral orations honouring public figures.

Eustathius mentions a commentary on Homer by Naucrates twice, who may be connected with the rhetorician by the name Sophista that he uses for him. However, Stephanus Byzantinus only mentions the commentator in relation to the commentary, raising the possibility of two people with the same name.
