= Gulf of Çandarlı =

Coordinates: 38.8800°N 26.9000°E

The Gulf of Çandarlı (Turkish: Çandarlı Körfezi), known in antiquity as the Elaitic Gulf (Ancient Greek: Ἐλαϊτικὸς κόλπος), is a gulf on the Aegean Sea, with its inlet between the cities of Çandarlı and Foça. Around it were located the chief cities of the Aeolian confederacy.

== See also ==
- Turkey
- Aegean Sea
