= Matron of Pitane =

Greek poet and parodist

Greek colonisation of western Anatolia (Aeolis shown in purple)

Matron of Pitane (Greek: Μάτρων, Mátrōn; fl. c. late 5th and early 4th centuries BC) was an Ancient Greek poet and parodist.

== Life ==
Matron, a native of Pitane in Aeolis, was a celebrated writer of parodies upon Homer, often quoted by Eustathius and Athenaeus.

He was probably a contemporary of Hegemon of Thasos, about the end of the fifth and the beginning of the fourth centuries BC, but at all events he cannot be placed later than the time of Philip of Macedon. Athenaeus calls him Ματρέας (Matréas) in some places, but this is clearly an error of the transcriber.

== Works ==
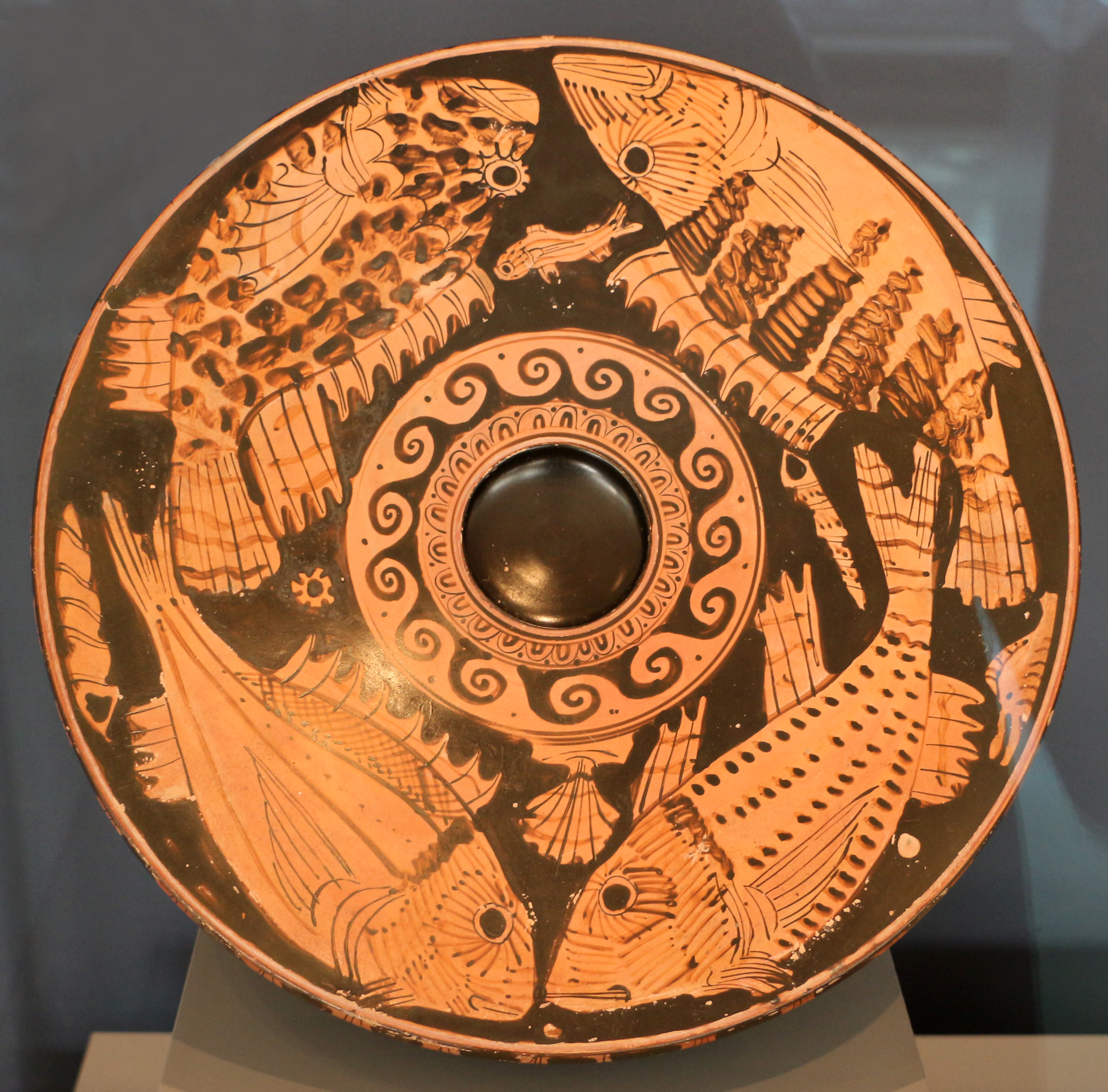
Fish plate from Attica, c. 400–350 BC

=== Parodies of Homer ===
Aside from six brief fragments, the Δει̑πνον Ἀττικόν (Deípnon Attikón: 'Attic Dinner') survives due to extensive quotation by Athenaeus. It is a mock-epic poem in 122 hexameters, describing a luxurious Athenian feast: a continuous list of dishes furnishes the banquet, including many fish-dinners, the whole animated effectively by interweaving epic military images, which the poet skilfully adopts from Homer in a manner comparable to the cento technique.

Athenaeus quotes a long fragment from this poem, beginning: Δεῖπνα μοι ἔννεπε, Μοῦσα, πολύτροφα καὶ μάλα πολλά (‘Tell me, Muse, of the many nourishing dinners’), an obvious parody of the opening of Homer's Odyssey. Matron's parody is in the tradition of Hegemon and Archestratus.

=== Editions ===
The fragments of his parodies were printed by H. Stephens, in the Dissertation on Parodies, appended to the Contest of Homer and Hesiod, 1573, 8vo., and in Brunck's Analecta, vol. ii. p. 245.
