= Cezayirli Gazi Hasan Paşa Monument =

Monument in Çeşme, Turkey

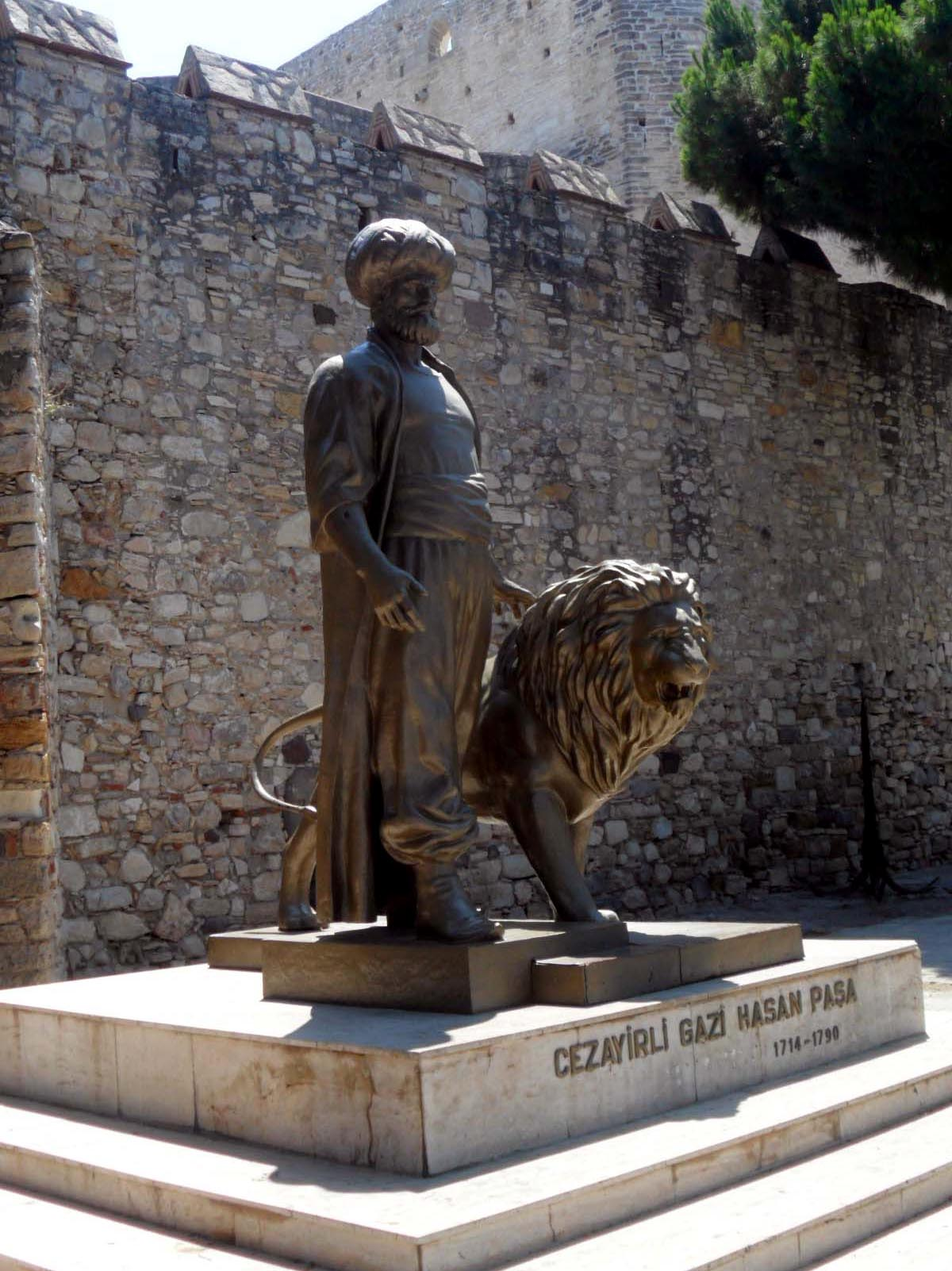
- Monument in front of the historical castle.
- Interactive map of Cezayirli Gazi Hasan Paşa Monument
- Location: Çeşme, İzmir Province, Turkey
- Coordinates: 38°19′25″N 26°18′11″E
- Designer: Haluk Tezonar
- Completion date: 1974
- Opening date: 1974

Cezayirli Gazi Hasan Pasha Monument is a monument in Çeşme ilçe (district) of İzmir Province, Turkey. The monument is situated in Çeşme downtown in front of the historical Çeşme Castle.

Cezayirli Gazi Hasan Pasha (1713-1790) was an Ottoman admiral and later grand vizier. He was famous for his domesticated lion which be bought during his service in Algiers. He was a captain during the naval Battle of Çeşme which was fought mainly in the bay of Çeşme. In the battle Cezayirli Hasan Pasha distinguished himself as an able seaman. Although the battle was disastrous for the Ottoman navy the admiral Hüsamettin Pasha was blamed for the defeat and Cezayirli Hasan Pasha was promoted after the battle.

Thus Çeşme is a convient place to erect a statue of Cezayirli Gazi Hasan Pasha. The monument was created by Haluk Tezonar (1942-1995), an academic in State College of Fine and Applied Arts (Turkish: İstanbul Devlet Tatbiki Güzel Sanatlar Yüksek Okulu) in 1974. The monument depicts Cezayirli Hasan Pasha standing with his lion beside him.
