= Çandarlı =

- Neighbourhood
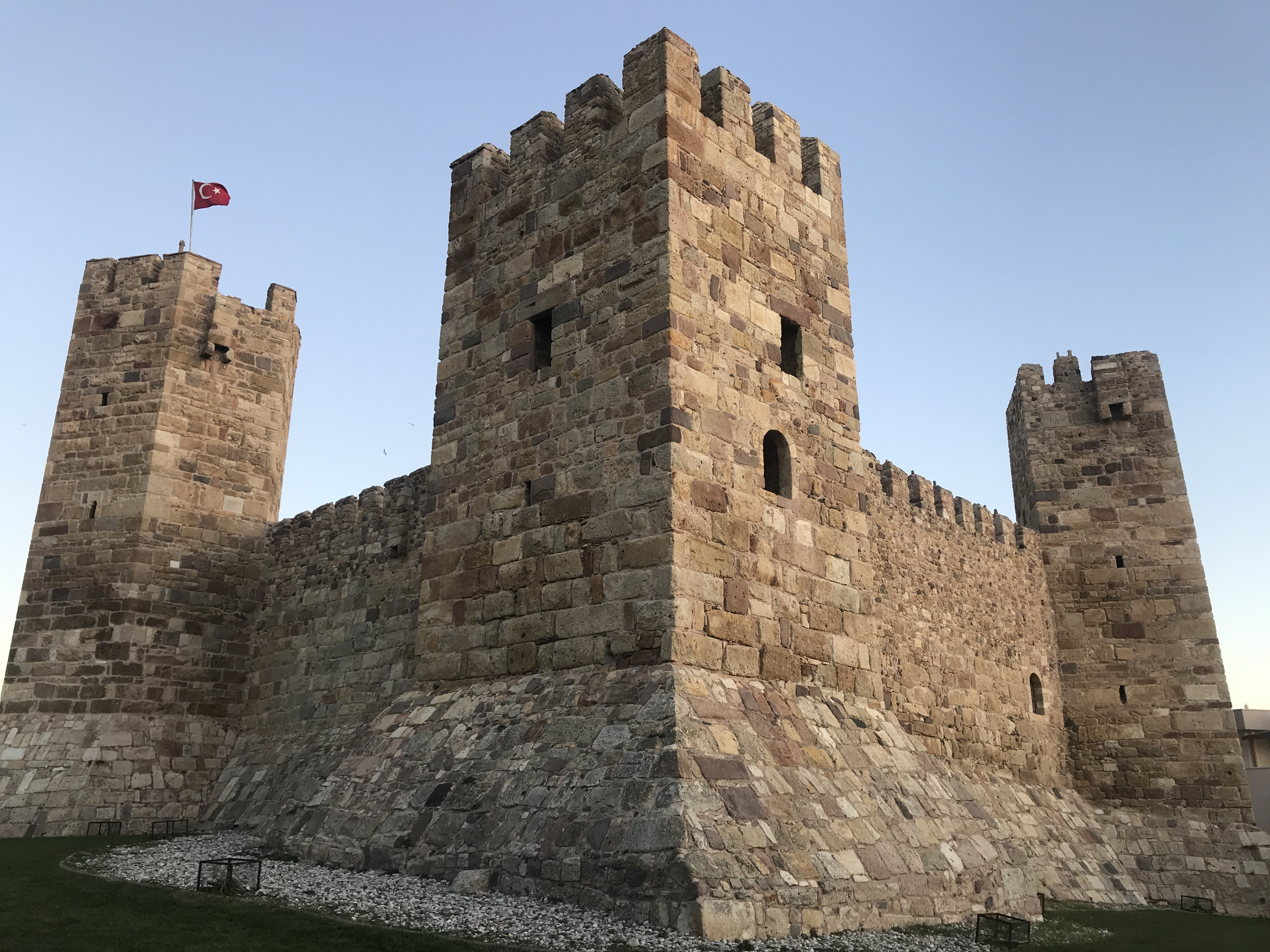
- Çandarlı Castle

- Location within Turkey Location within İzmir
- Coordinates: 38.9377°N 26.9327°E
- Country: Turkey
- Province: İzmir
- District: Dikili
- Population (2022): 8,021
- Time zone: UTC+3 (TRT)
- Area code: 0232

Çandarlı is a neighbourhood in the municipality and district of Dikili, İzmir Province, Turkey. Its population is 8,021 (2022). Before the 2013 reorganisation, it was a town (belde).

It is a well-developed coastal town and an important tourist resort. It is a fishing village, where a lot of daily life revolves around such, with many people having jobs surrounding the fishing industry, making nets, gutting and cooking the fish, not to forget the fisherman themselves. In summer the population nearly doubles with tourists, normally domestic tourists rather than international. Çandarlı is situated on the northern coast of the Gulf of Çandarlı, opposite the important industrial center of Aliağa.

The town's landmark is the 15th century Ottoman castle rebuilt by the Grand Vizier Çandarlı Halil Pasha the Younger. The castle, built to protect Sultan Murat II who preferred to reside in nearby Manisa from a possible outside attack, is fully intact and open to visitors.

Çandarlı Halil Pasha the Younger also gave the town its present name, naming it after his own family. Çandarlı's name in antiquity was Pitane. The ruins are situated slightly outside the town itself.

== See also ==
- Çandarlı family
- Çandar
