= Pitane (Aeolis) =

Ancient Greek city

- Πιτάνη (Ancient Greek)
- Location within Turkey
- 38°55′41″N 26°56′14″E
- Type: Settlement
- Location: Çandarlı, İzmir Province, Turkey
- Region: Aeolis

Pitane (Ancient Greek: Πιτάνη), near Çandarlı, Turkey, was an ancient Greek town of the ancient region of Aeolis, in Asia Minor. It was situated near the mouth of the river Evenus on the bay of Elaea. It was one of the eleven ancient Aeolian settlements and possessed considerable commercial advantages in having two harbours. It was the birthplace of the academic philosopher Arcesilaus, and in the reign of Titus it suffered severely from an earthquake. The town is still mentioned by Hierocles. Pliny the Elder mentions in its vicinity a river Canaius, which is not noticed by any other writer; but it may possibly be the river Pitanes, spoken of by Ptolemy, and which seems to derive its name from the town of Pitane.

Its site is near modern Çandarlı, Asiatic Turkey.

== History ==
Excavations in the necropolis of Pitane revealed ceramic finds from the Mycenaean, protogeometric, geometric, orientalizing, and the Archaic Greek periods.

Pitane is believed to be the northernmost point of Mycenaean influence in Anatolia.

A kouros from Pitane, dated to the 6th century BCE, is now housed at the Bergama Archeological Museum.

=== Classical Period ===
In the fifth century BCE, Pitane was a member of the Delian League and is recorded as paying a tribute of 1,000 drachmas. In 335 BCE, Alexander the Great's general Parmenion laid siege to the city as part of a campaign against the Persian Empire, but the city was saved by the Persian general Memnon of Rhodes.

=== Hellenistic Period ===
In c. 319 BCE, its citizen Herakleitos, son of Lysistratos, was honoured by the people of Delphi. In c. 325-c. 275 BCE, the people of Abydos honoured another citizen, Charidemos, son of Antiphanes, with a dedication at Delphi, which included a statue by the famous Athenian sculptor Praxiteles.

In the reign of the Seleucid king Antiochus I Soter (r. 281-261 BCE), Pitane was able to expand its territory by paying the king 380 talents to purchase some territory. This territory was the subject of a dispute with the city of Mytilene on nearby Lesbos in the mid-second century BCE, which was arbitrated by Pergamon. We also learn from this document that Pitane was a free city in the Hellenistic period that was not subject to the Attalid dynasty and that its public document no longer used the Aeolic dialect. In 84 BCE, Mithridates VI fled to Pitane while evading the Roman general Gaius Flavius Fimbria, where he was besieged by Fimbria before escaping to Mytilene by sea.

=== Christian Era ===
Under the Latin name Pitanae, the town was Christianized and became the seat of a bishop. No longer a residential bishopric, it remains a titular see of the Roman Catholic Church.

== Notable people ==
- Autolycus (c. 360 - c. 290 BCE), mathematician.
- Arcesilaus (316/5-241/0 BCE), founder of Academic skepticism
- Matron (late fourth century BCE), author of the epic parody The Attic Feast.

== See also ==
- List of ancient Greek cities
