= Çeşme =

- District and municipality
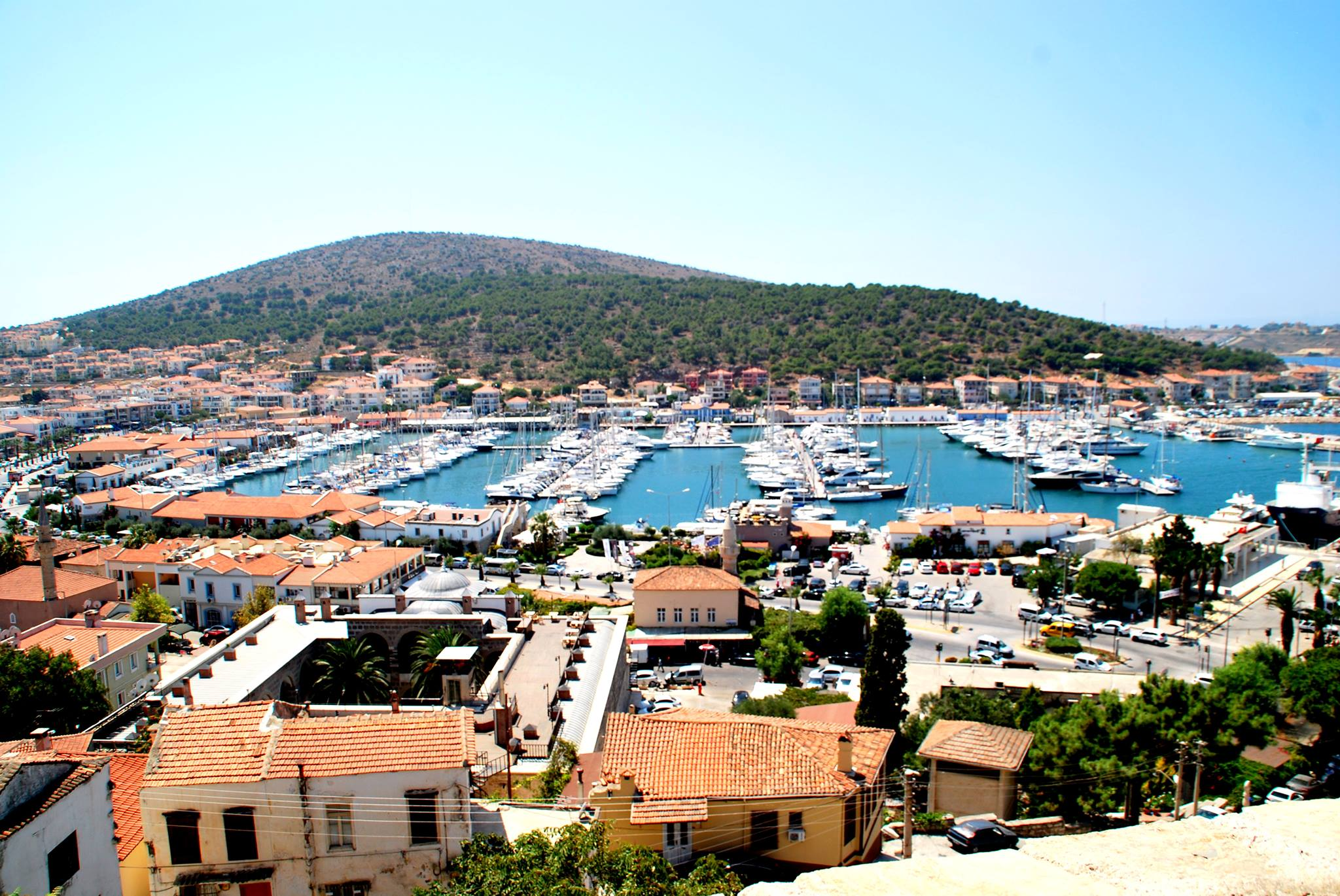
- Çeşme Marina

- Logo

- Map showing Çeşme District in İzmir Province

- Location within Turkey Location within İzmir
- Coordinates: 38°19′28″N 26°18′11″E
- Country: Turkey
- Province: İzmir

Government
  - Mayor: Lal Denizli (CHP)
- Area: 285 km^{2} (110 sq mi)
- Elevation: 5 m (16 ft)
- Population (2022): 48,924
  - Density: 172/km^{2} (445/sq mi)
- Time zone: UTC+3 (TRT)
- Postal code: 35980
- Area code: 0232
- Website: www.cesme.bel.tr

Çeşme, (Note: Turkish pronunciation: [ˈtʃeʃme]) officially the Çeşme Municipality, (Note: Turkish: Çeşme Belediyesi) is a municipality and district of İzmir Province, Turkey. Its area is 285 km^{2}, and its population is 48,924 (2022). It sits at Turkey's westernmost end, on a promontory on the tip of the peninsula that also carries the same name and that extends inland to form a whole with the wider Urla-Karaburun-Çeşme Peninsula. It is a popular holiday resort and the district center, where two thirds of the district population is concentrated. Çeşme is located 85 km west of İzmir, the largest metropolitan center in Turkey's Aegean Region. There is a six-lane highway connecting the two cities (Otoyol 32). Çeşme district has two neighboring districts, Karaburun to the north and Urla to the east, both of which are also part of İzmir Province. The name "Çeşme" means "fountain" and possibly draws reference from the many Ottoman fountains that are scattered across the city.

== Name ==
Turkish sources always cited the town and the region as Çeşme (or Cheshme) which is originally a Persian word since the first settlement 2 km south of the present-day center (Çeşmeköy) founded by Tzachas and pursued for some time by his brother Yalvaç before an interlude until the 14th century. The name Çeşme means "spring, fountain" in Persian (چشمه) and possibly draws reference from the many Ottoman fountains scattered across the city.

== History ==
Çeşme is on the peninsula opposite of Chios

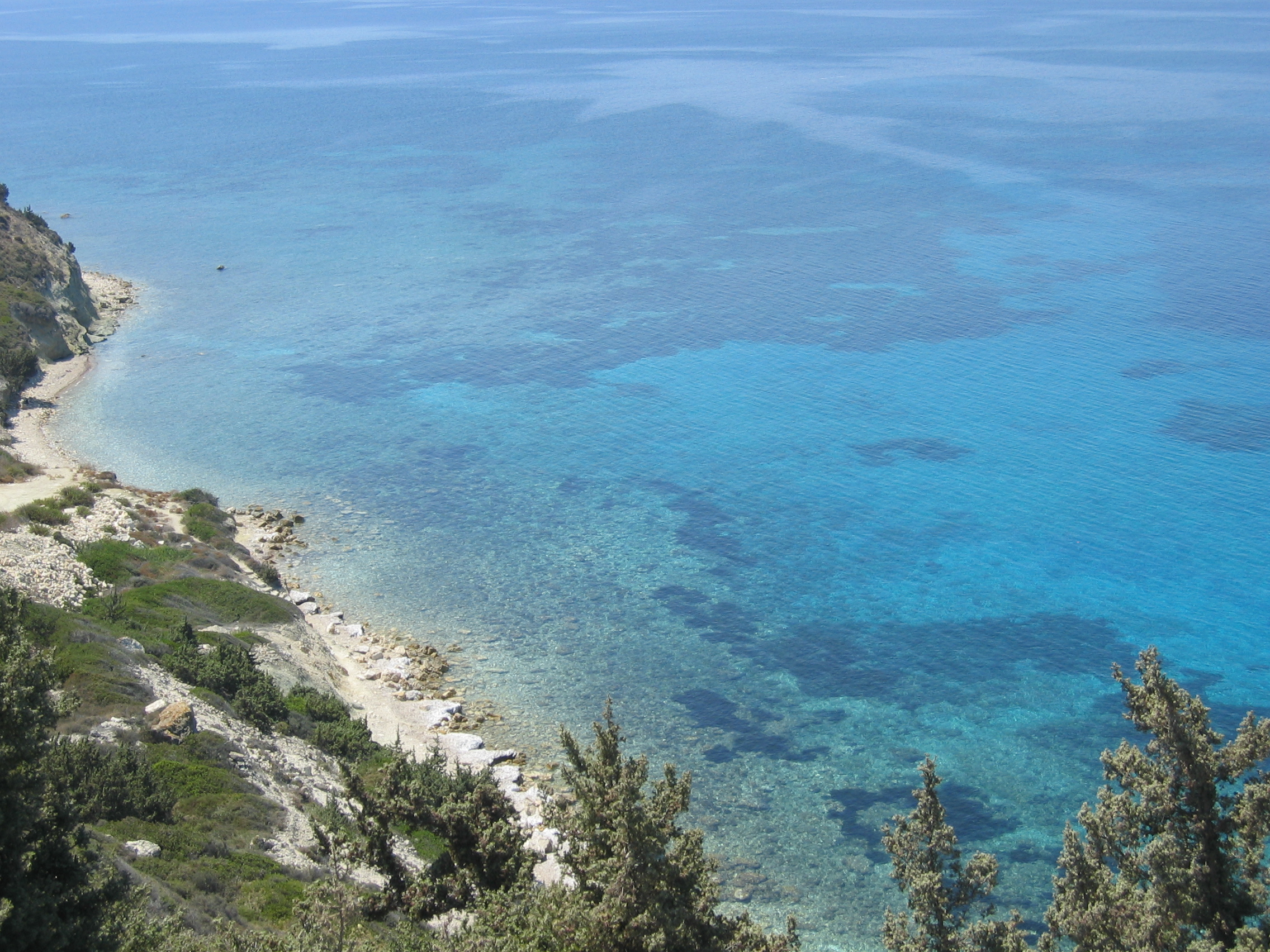
Çeşme sea view

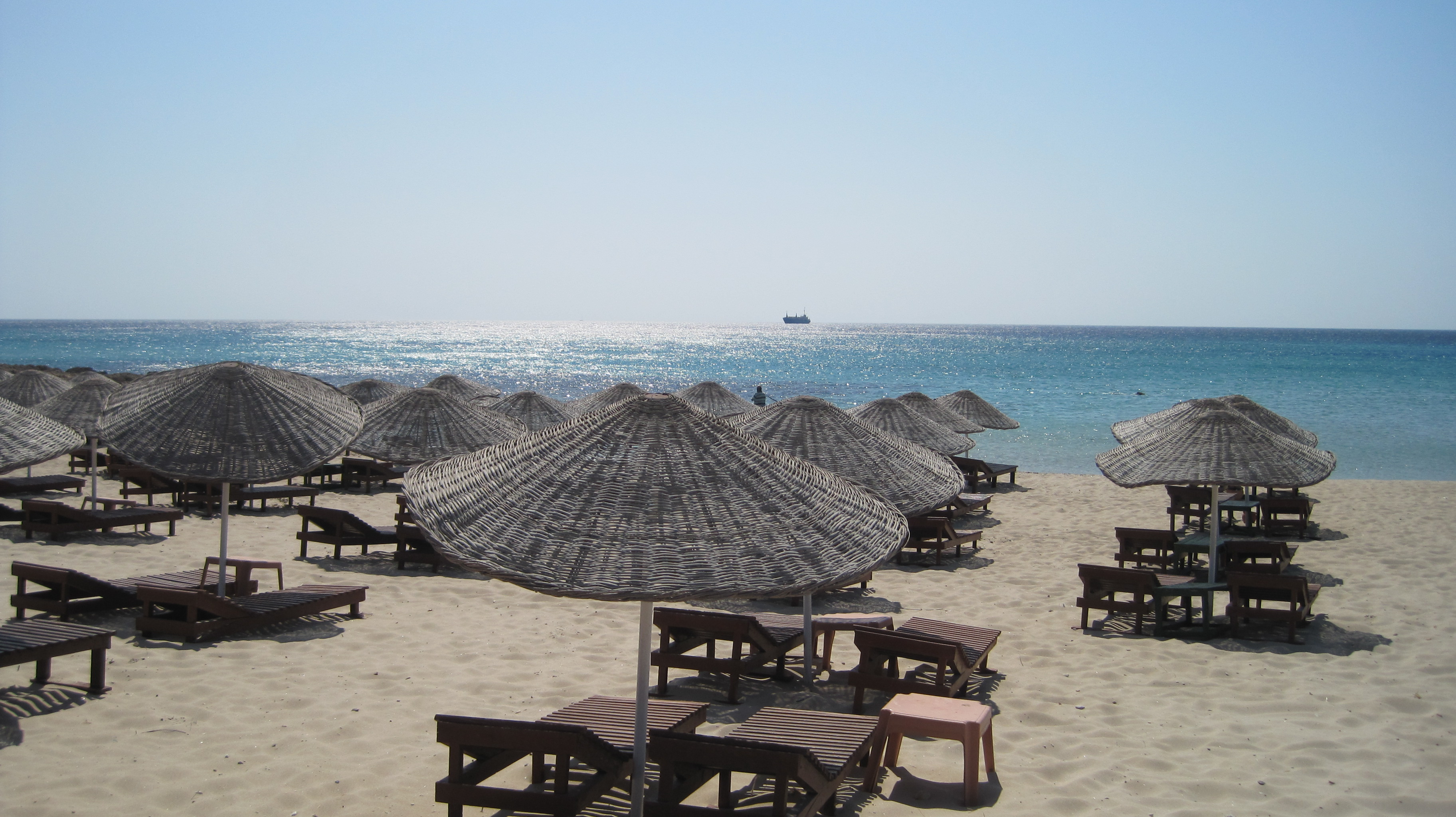
Çeşme Beach

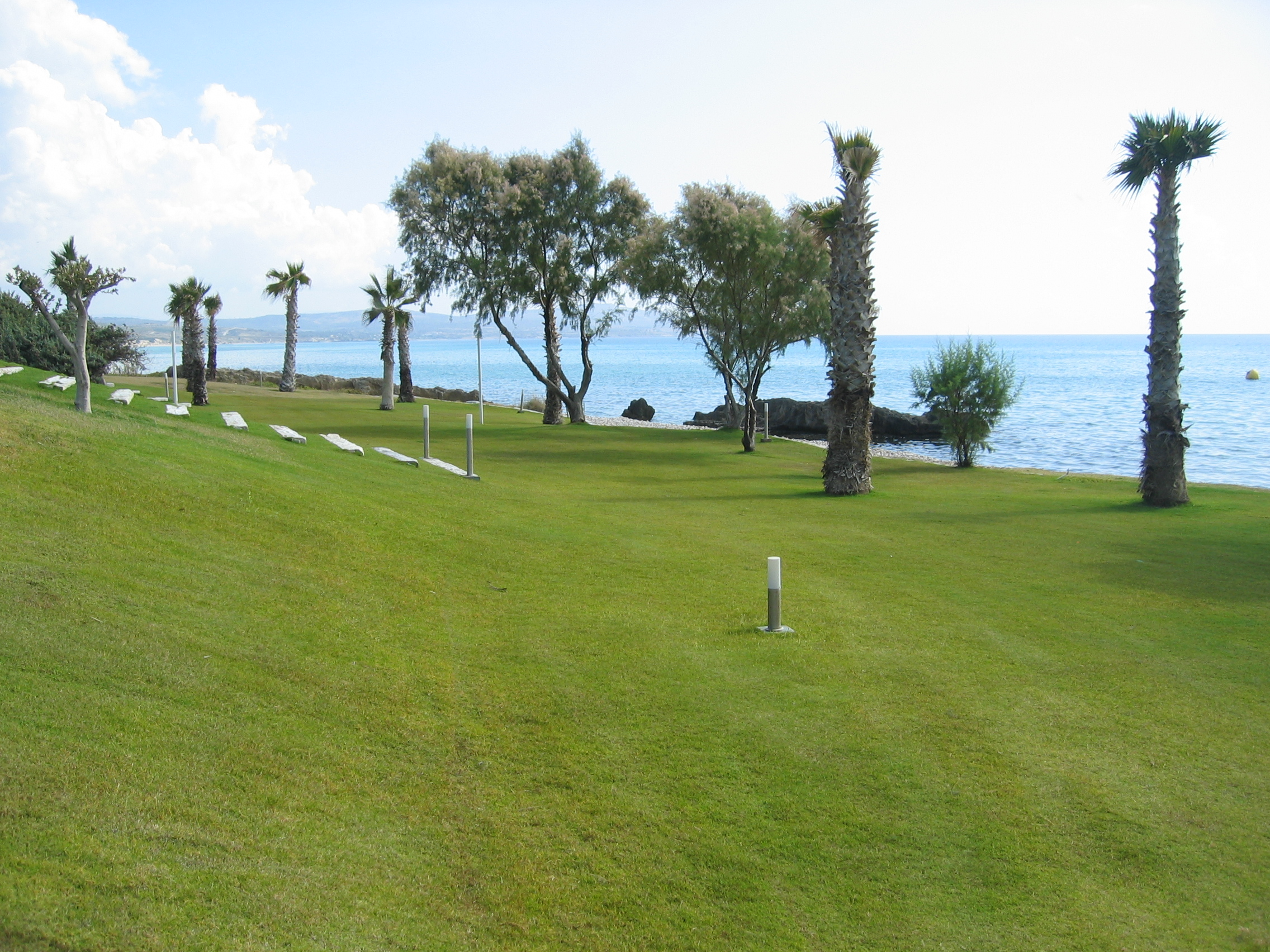
Çeşme Atakum Beach

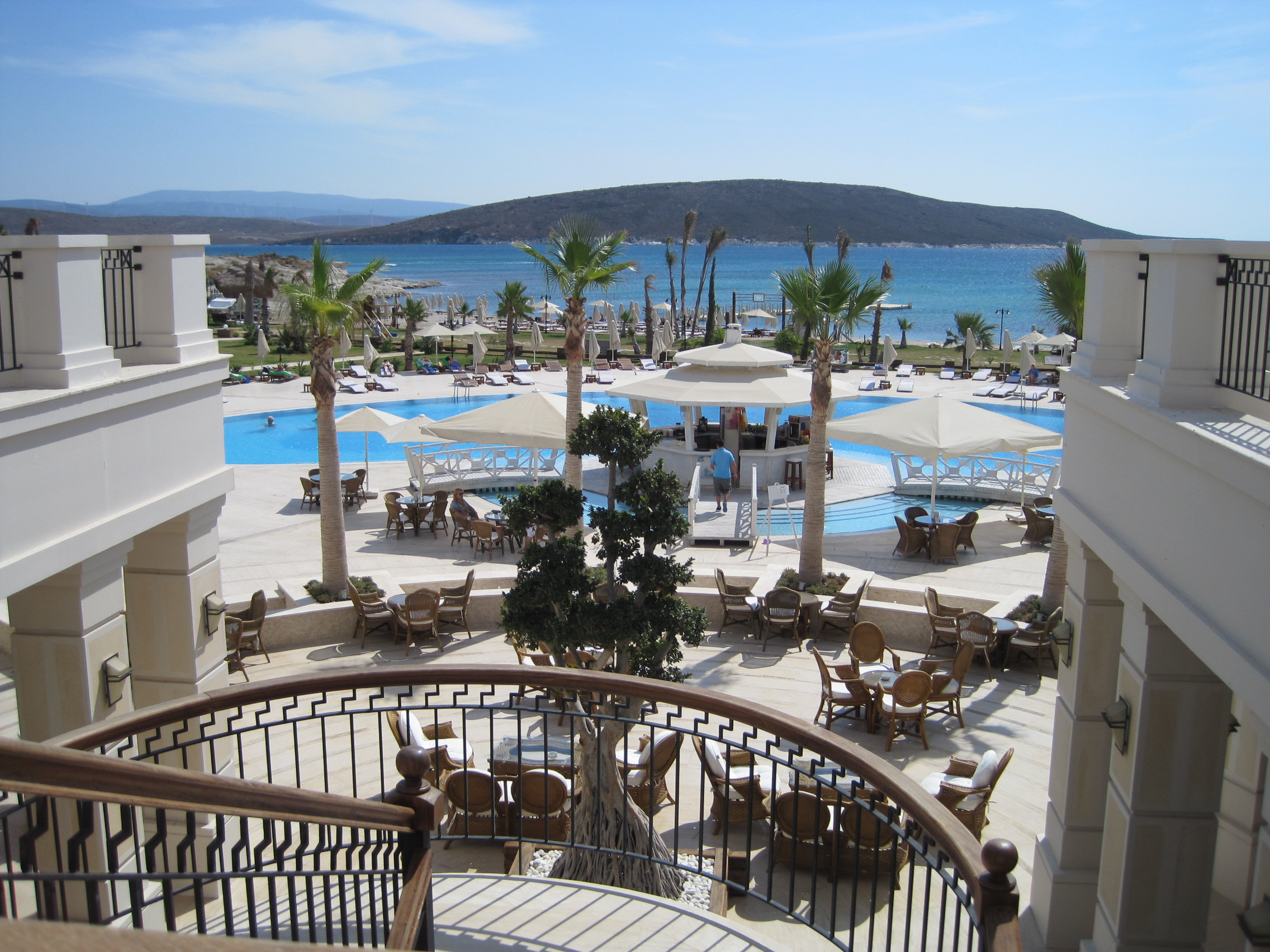
Alaçatı Coastline

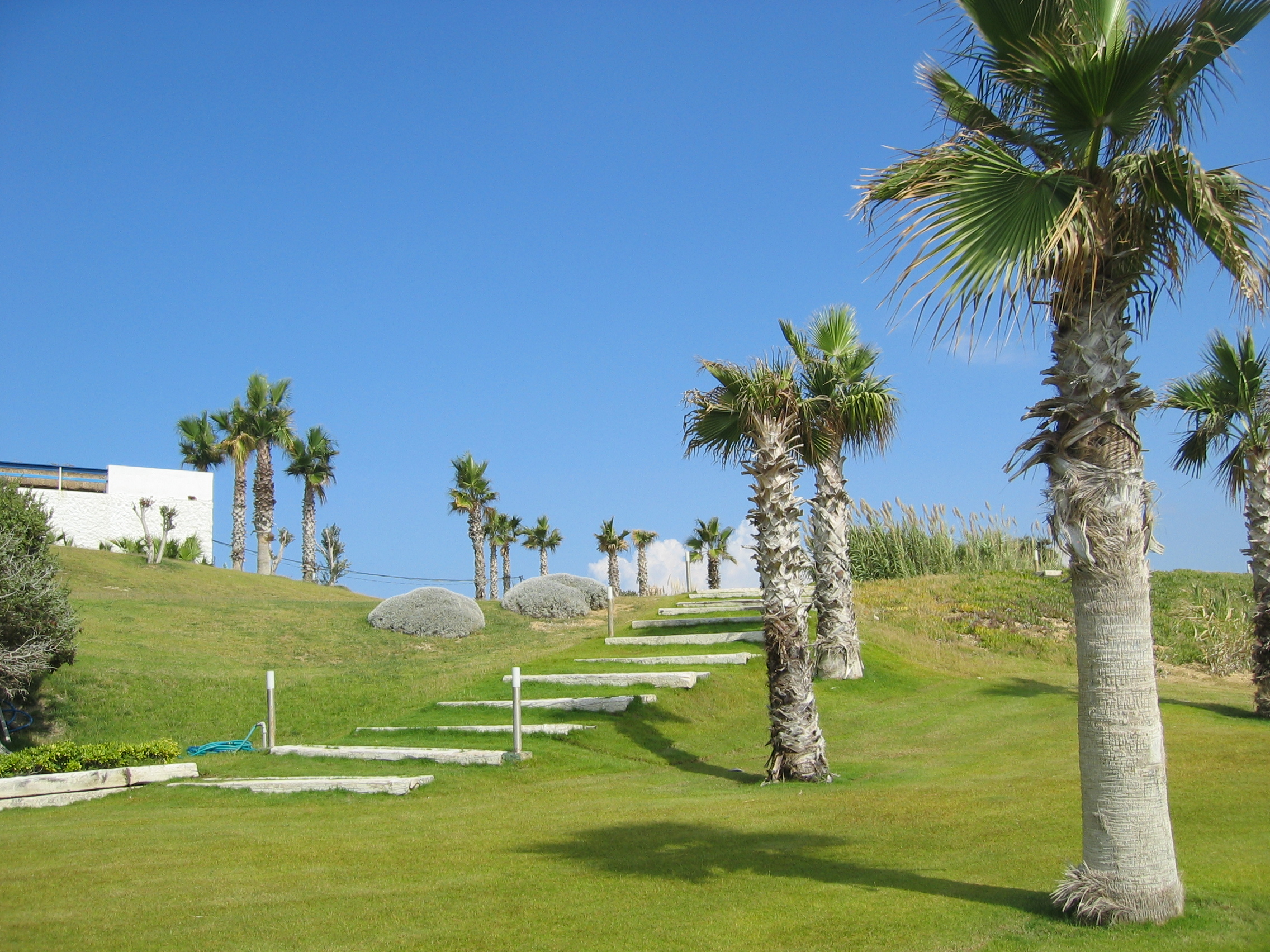
Çeşme Atakum Beach

The urban center and the port of the region in antiquity was at Erythrae (present-day Ildırı), in another bay to the north-east of Çeşme.

Most probably, the ancient Greek polis of Boutheia (Βούθεια or Βουθία in ancient Greek) was situated in Çeşme. In the 5th century BC, Boutheia was a dependency of Erythrae and paid tribute to Athens as a member of the Delian League. During the Byzantine period the town became known as Krini (Κρήνη or "fountain" in Greek).

After the Ottoman conquest, the town became known as Çeşme and experienced its golden age in the Middle Ages, when a modus vivendi established in the 14th century between the Republic of Genoa, which held Chios (Scio), and the Beylik of Aydinids, which controlled the Anatolian mainland, was pursued under the Ottomans, and export and import products between western Europe and Asia were funneled via Çeşme and the ports of the island, only hours away and tributary to Ottomans but still autonomous after 1470. Chios became part of the Ottoman Empire in an easy campaign led by Piyale Pasha in 1566. In fact, the Pasha simply laid anchor in Çeşme and summoned the notables of the island to notify them of the change of authority. After the Ottoman capture and through preference shown by the foreign merchants, the trade hub gradually shifted to İzmir, which until then was touched only tangentially by the caravan routes from the east, and the prominence of the present-day metropolis became more pronounced after the 17th century. In 1770, the Çeşme bay became the location of naval Battle of Chesma between Russian and Ottoman fleets during Russo-Turkish War (1768–1774). From 1867 until 1922, Çeşme was part of Aydin Vilayet. After the Balkan Wars, Bosniaks mainly from Montenegro settled in the environs of Çeşme such as Alaçatı and Çiflikköy. Up until September 16, 1922 Greeks still composed the majority population of Çeşme and its environs. There were 39.073 Greeks in Çeşme Municipality while there were 4.539 Turks and 199 Jews. In 1924 with the Population exchange Muslims from Greece mainly from Veria (Karaferiye) settled in the town, while the Greeks of Cesme settled in Nea Erythraia and Nea Krini, Greece.

Çeşme regained some its former lustre starting with the beginning of the 19th century, when its own products, notably grapes and mastic, found channels of export. The town population increased considerably until the early decades of the 20th century, with immigration from the islands of the Aegean and the novel dimension of a seasonal resort center becoming important factors in the increase. The viniculture was for the most part replaced with the growing of watermelons in recent decades, which acquired another name of association with Çeşme aside from the thermal baths, surfing, fruits, vineyards, cheese, tourism, and history.

== Archaeology ==
In January 2021, archaeologists headed by Elif Koparal, announced the discovery of the ruins of a 2500 year-old temple of Aphrodite from the 5th century BC. Among other findings in and around the temple, they found a statue piece depicting a woman, a terracotta female head and an inscription that reads, "This is the sacred area". The traces of the temple were first excavated in 2016.

== The region ==
Çeşme has been a location for country houses and secondary residences especially for the inhabitants of İzmir for more than a century. In recent decades it has grown into a major centre of international tourism in Turkey. Hotels, boutique hotels, marinas, clubs, restaurants, family accommodation possibilities (pansiyon) and other facilities for visitors are found in the town center and in the surrounding towns, villages and countryside, and the area also has a number of beaches.

Çeşme district has one depending township with own municipal administration, Alaçatı, where tourism is an equally important driving force as the district center area and which offers its own arguments for attracting visitors, as well as four villages: Ildırı on the coast towards the north, which is notable for being the location of ancient Erythrae, and three others which are more in the background, in terms both of their geographical location and renown: Germiyan, Karaköy and Ovacık, where agriculture and livestock breeding still forms the backbone of the economy. Some andesite, lime, and marble are also being quarried in the Çeşme area, while the share of industrial activities in the economy remains negligible. In terms of livestock, an ovine breed known as sakız koyunu in Turkish (literally "Chios sheep"), more probably a crossbreeding between that island's sheep and breeds from Anatolia, is considered in Turkey to be native to the Çeşme region, where it yields the highest levels of productivity in terms of their meat, their milk, their fleece, and the number of lambs they produce.

Preparations such as jam, ice cream and desserts, and even sauces for fish preparations, based on the distinctively flavored resin of the tree pistachia lentiscus from which it is harvested, are among nationally known culinary specialties of Çeşme. The adjacent Greek island of Chios (sakız in Turkish is the name for both Chios and mastic resin) is the source of mastic resin. Some efforts to produce mastic resin (μαστίχα/mastiha in Greek) in Çeşme, where climate conditions are similar, but they failed to produce the aromatic mastiche. A number of efforts are being made to rehabilitate the potential presented by the mastic trees that presently grow in the wilderness, and to increase the number of cultivated trees, especially those planted by secondary-residence owners who grow them as a hobby activity. The fish is also abundant both in variety and quantity along Çeşme district's coastline.

In relation to tourism, it is common for the resorts along Çeşme district's 90 km coastline to be called by the name of their beaches or coves or the visitor's facilities and attractions they offer, as in Şifne (Ilıca), famous both for its thermal baths and beach, and in Çiftlikköy (Çatalazmak), Dalyanköy, Reisdere (also spelled Reis Dere), Küçükliman, Paşalimanı, Ayayorgi, Kocakarı, Kum, Mavi and Pırlanta beaches; Altunyunus, synonymous with a large hotel located in its cove; and Tursite, by the name of the villas located there. Some of these localities may not be shown on a map of administrative divisions The district area as a whole is one of the spots in Turkey where foreign purchases of real estate are concentrated at the highest levels.

The town of Çeşme lies across a strait facing the Greek island of Chios, which is only a few miles' away. There are regular ferry connections between the two locations, as well as larger ferries from and to Italy (Ancona, Bari, and Brindisi), used extensively by Turks living in Germany returning for their summer holidays.

== The town ==
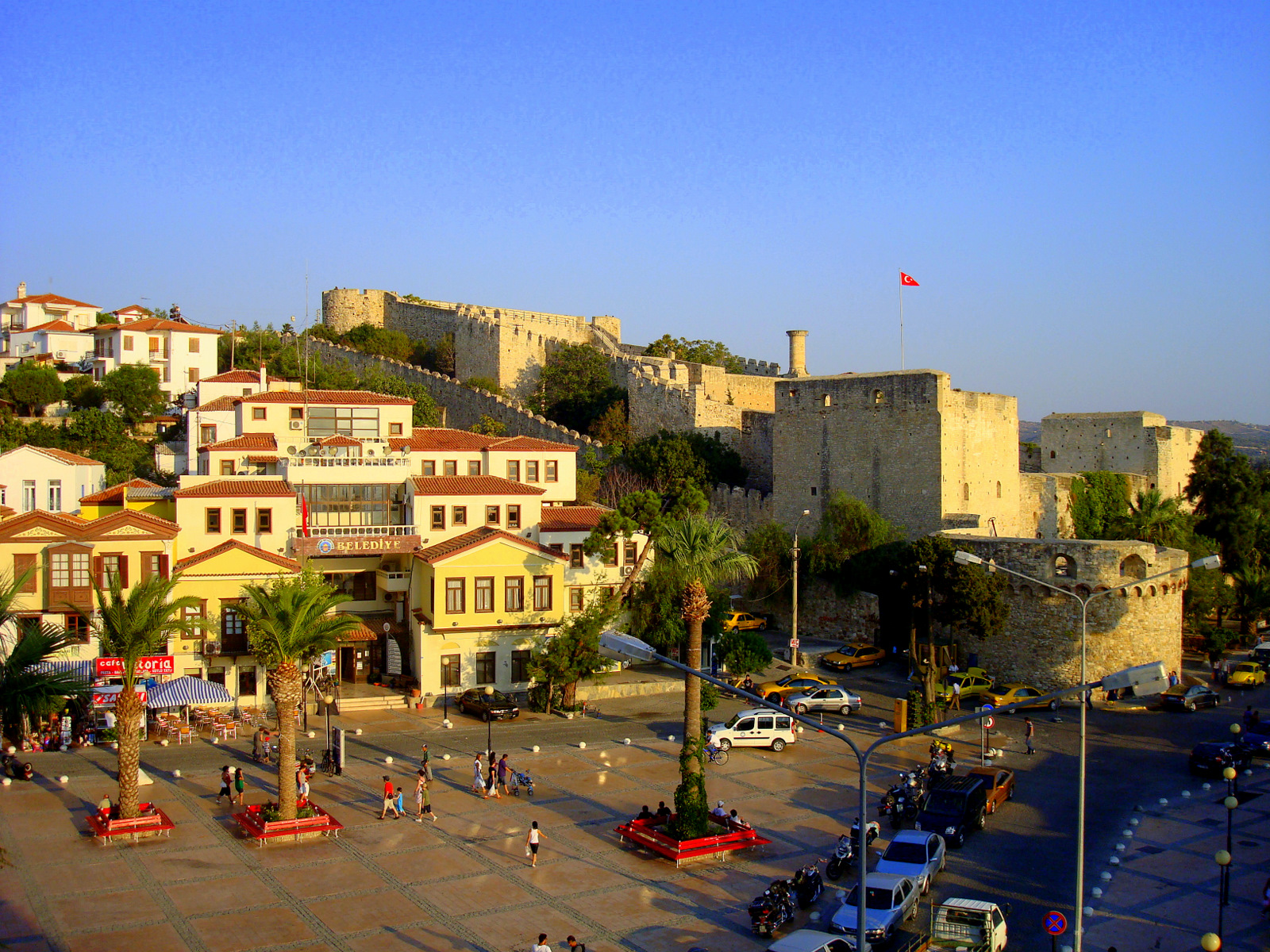
Typical Ottoman houses in Çeşme

The town itself is dominated by Çeşme Castle. While the castle is recorded to have been considerably extended and strengthened during the reign of Ottoman sultan Bayezid II, sources differ as to their citation of the original builders, whether the Genoese or the Turks at an earlier time after the early 15th century capture. A statue of Cezayirli Gazi Hasan Pasha (Cezayirli Hasan Paşa Monument), one of the naval commanders of the Battle of Çeşme is in front of the castle and the Pasha is depicted caressing his famous pet lion and facing the town square. The battle itself, although ended in Ottoman defeat, had seen Hasan Pasha pulling out honorably after having sunk the Russian flagship Sv. Evstafii, together with his own ship, after which he had to follow the main battle from the coast before joining the capital by way of land, where he rapidly rose to become a distinguished grand vizier.

A few paces south of the castle, there is an Ottoman caravanserai built in the early centuries of the Ottoman conquest in 1528 by order of Süleyman the Magnificent, and it is now restored and transformed into a boutique hotel. The imposing but redundant 19th century Greek Orthodox church of Ayios Haralambos is used for temporary exhibitions. Along some of the back streets of the town are old traditional Ottoman houses, as well as Sakız house-type residences of more peculiar lines, for the interest of strollers.

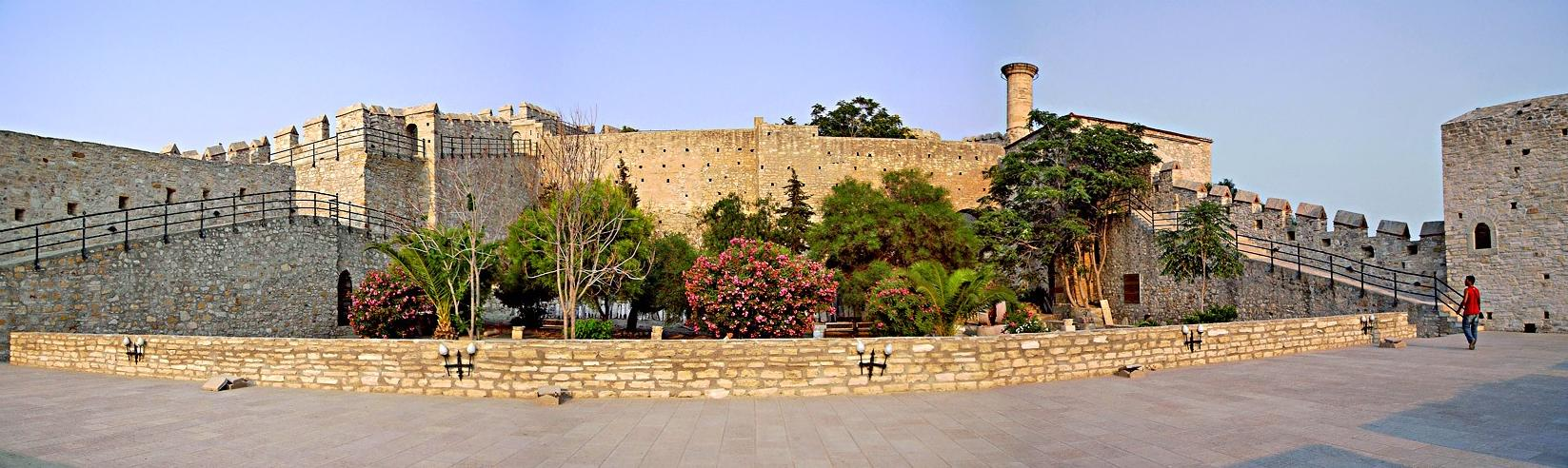
Çeşme Castle, inside view.

== Composition ==
There are 25 neighbourhoods in Çeşme District:

- Alaçatı
- Altınkum
- Altınyunus
- Ardıç
- Boyalık
- Çakabey
- Celal Bayar
- Çiftlik
- Cumhuriyet
- Dalyan
- Fahrettinpaşa
- Germiyan
- Ildır
- Ilıca
- İsmet İnönü
- Karaköy
- Musalla
- Onaltı Eylül
- Ovacık
- Reisdere
- Sakarya
- Şehit Mehmet
- Şifne
- Üniversite
- Yalı

=== Ilıca ===
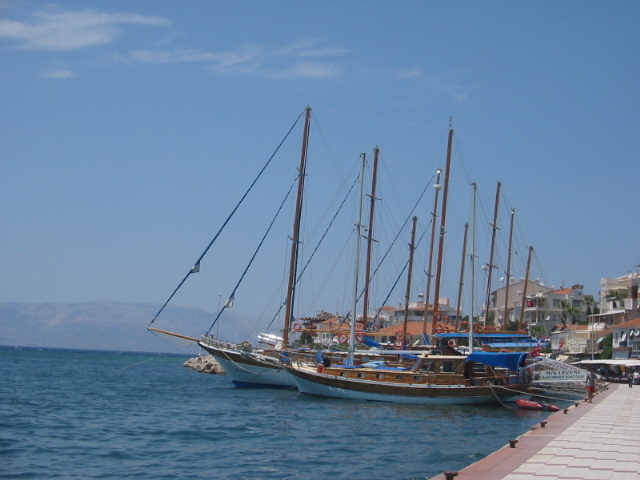
Yachts in Çeşme harbor

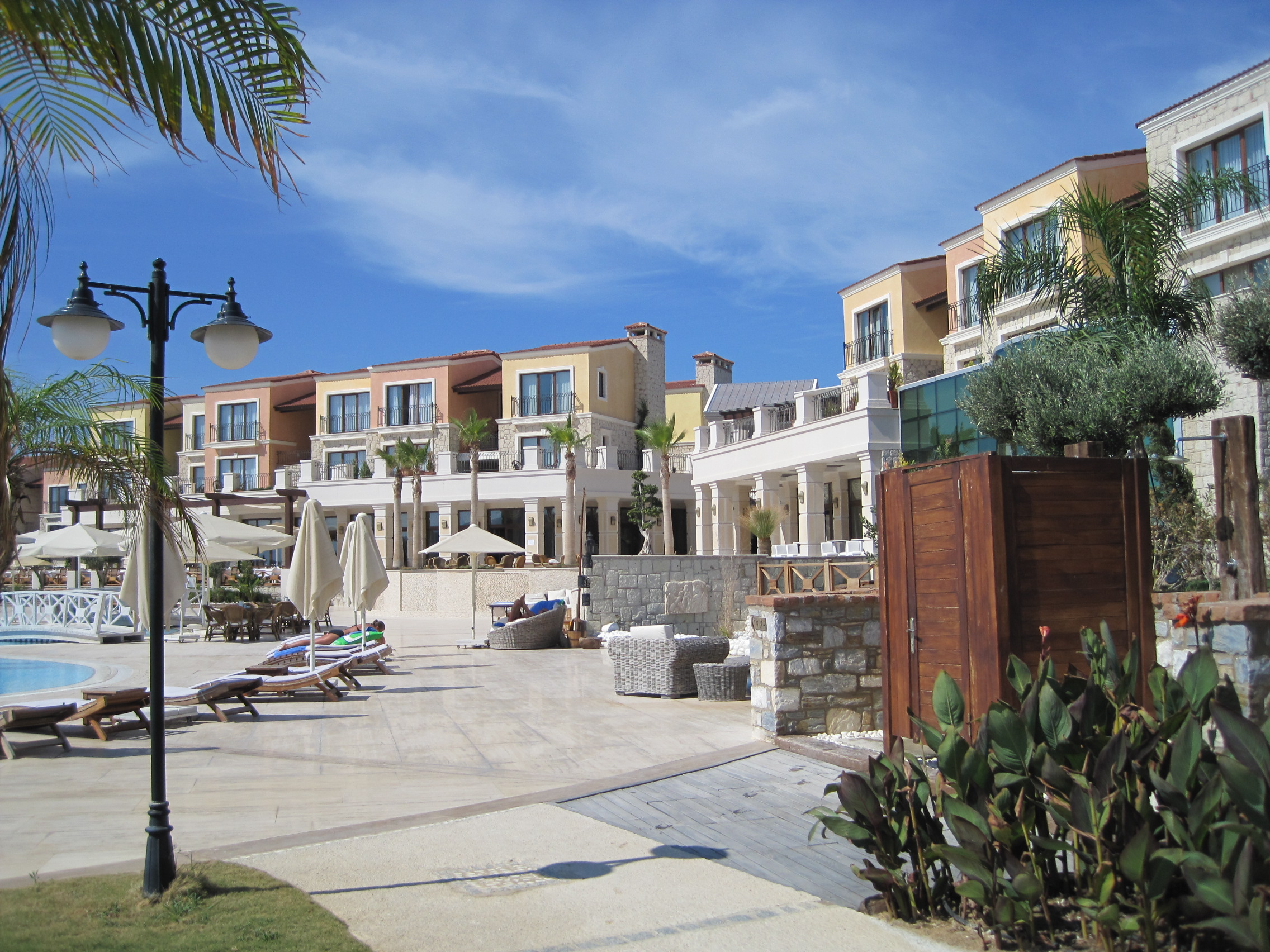
Architecture of Çeşme

Ilıca is a large resort area 5 km east of Çeşme to which it is attached administratively, although it bears aspects of a township apart in many of its characteristics. It is famed for its thermal springs, which is the very meaning of its name.

Ilıca started out as a distinct settlement towards the end of the 19th century, initially as a retreat for wealthy people, especially from İzmir and during summer holidays. Today, it is a popular destination for many. Mentioned by Pausanias and Charles Texier, Ilıca thermal springs, which extend well into the sea, are also notable in Turkey for having been the subject of the first scientifically based analysis in Turkish language of a thermal spring, published in 1909 by Yusuf Cemal. By his time the thermal springs were well-known both internationally, scientific and journalistic literature having been published in French and in Greek, and across Ottoman lands, since the construction here of a still-standing yalı associated with Muhammad Ali of Egypt's son Tosun Pasha who had sought a cure in Ilıca before his premature death.

Ilıca has a fine beach of its own, about 1.5 km long, as well as favorable wind conditions which make it a prized location for windsurfing.

== Climate ==
Çeşme has a Mediterranean climate (Köppen: Csa) with hot, muggy summers, nevertheless with very low precipitation; and mild, rainy winters.

Climate data for Çeşme (1991–2020)
Month	Jan	Feb	Mar	Apr	May	Jun	Jul	Aug	Sep	Oct	Nov	Dec	Year
Mean daily maximum °C (°F)	13.6 (56.5)	14.4 (57.9)	16.6 (61.9)	20.1 (68.2)	24.6 (76.3)	29.0 (84.2)	30.8 (87.4)	30.9 (87.6)	27.9 (82.2)	23.7 (74.7)	19.0 (66.2)	14.9 (58.8)	22.2 (72.0)
Daily mean °C (°F)	9.5 (49.1)	10.2 (50.4)	12.3 (54.1)	15.4 (59.7)	19.7 (67.5)	24.1 (75.4)	26.2 (79.2)	26.3 (79.3)	23.0 (73.4)	18.9 (66.0)	14.5 (58.1)	11.1 (52.0)	17.6 (63.7)
Mean daily minimum °C (°F)	5.9 (42.6)	6.4 (43.5)	8.1 (46.6)	10.9 (51.6)	15.0 (59.0)	19.4 (66.9)	21.9 (71.4)	22.2 (72.0)	18.4 (65.1)	14.5 (58.1)	10.4 (50.7)	7.6 (45.7)	13.4 (56.1)
Average precipitation mm (inches)	114.29 (4.50)	96.61 (3.80)	65.81 (2.59)	36.09 (1.42)	20.2 (0.80)	4.62 (0.18)	0.31 (0.01)	0.85 (0.03)	13.05 (0.51)	44.11 (1.74)	76.63 (3.02)	120.37 (4.74)	592.94 (23.34)
Average precipitation days (≥ 1.0 mm)	8.9	7.6	6.1	4.6	2.9	2.0	1.0	1.0	1.9	3.4	6.3	9.0	54.7
Average relative humidity (%)	76.1	75.1	73.0	72.2	71.3	67.9	67.1	67.7	70.2	73.7	76.1	76.8	72.2
Mean monthly sunshine hours	118.8	142.2	202.5	244.7	307.6	347.8	379.7	355.3	283.3	227.4	152.6	109.1	2,841.1
Source: NOAA

== Windsurfing in Çeşme ==
Çeşme is the third best surfing resort in the world. Alaçatı, a town located here, offers the ideal location for surfing, and this is where all the surfing schools are located. Surf Festivals take place here every year. Alaçatı is unique as the depth of the water does not go deeper than 1 meter for over 700 meters off shore and the area receives heavy winds.

== Twin towns – sister cities ==
Çeşme is twinned with:

- Agios Sergios, Cyprus
- Ancona, Italy
- Asciano, Italy
- Bakhchysarai, Ukraine
- Chios, Greece
- Dömös, Hungary
- El Mina, Lebanon
- Serpukhov, Russia
- Voula, Greece
- Wise, United States

Çeşme also cooperates with Tuzlukçu, Konya Province.

== Famous residents ==
- Mehmet Culum (born 1948), a novelist who based his books on stories from residents of various regions in western Turkey.

== Gallery ==
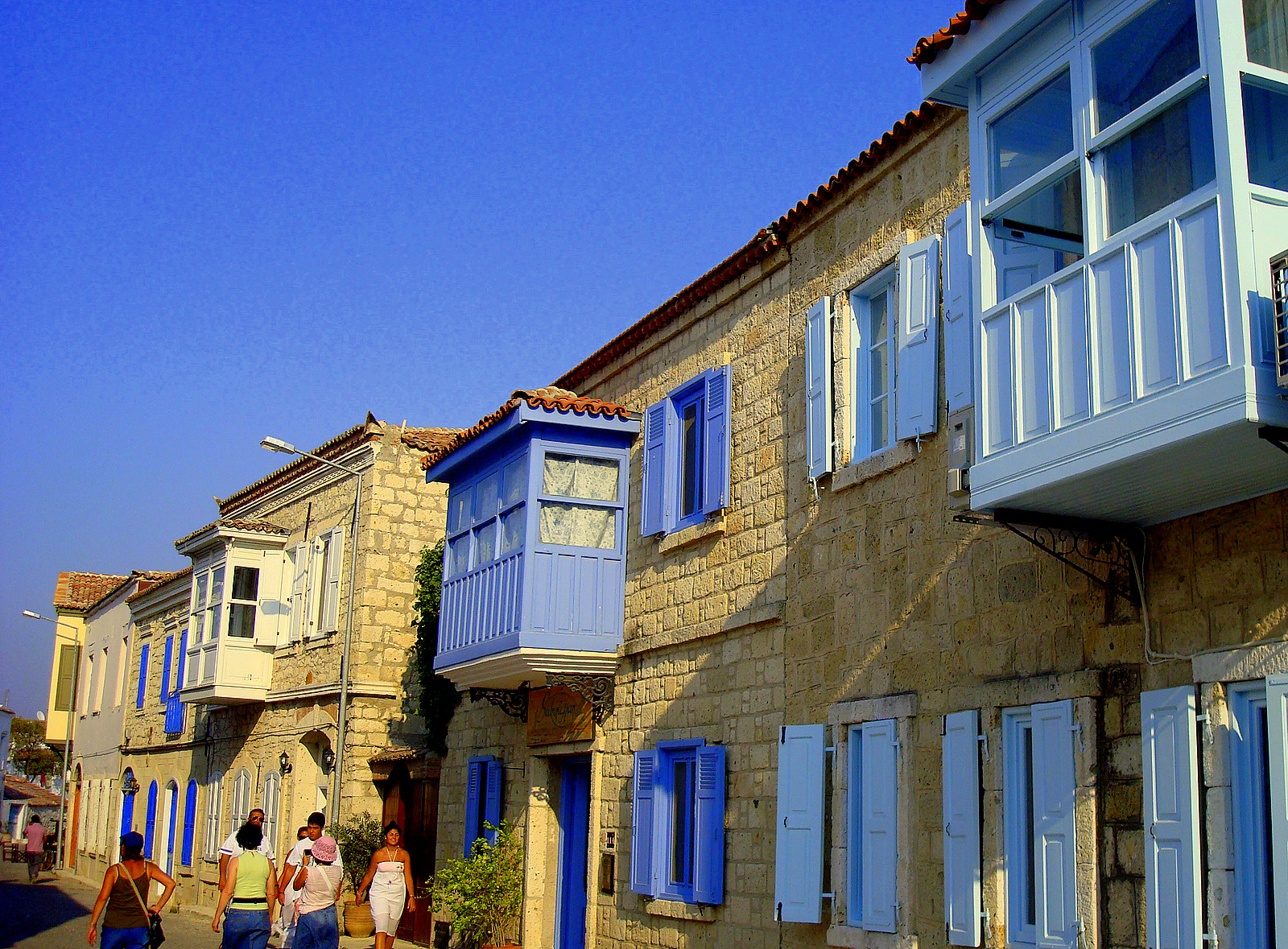
View of Alaçatı

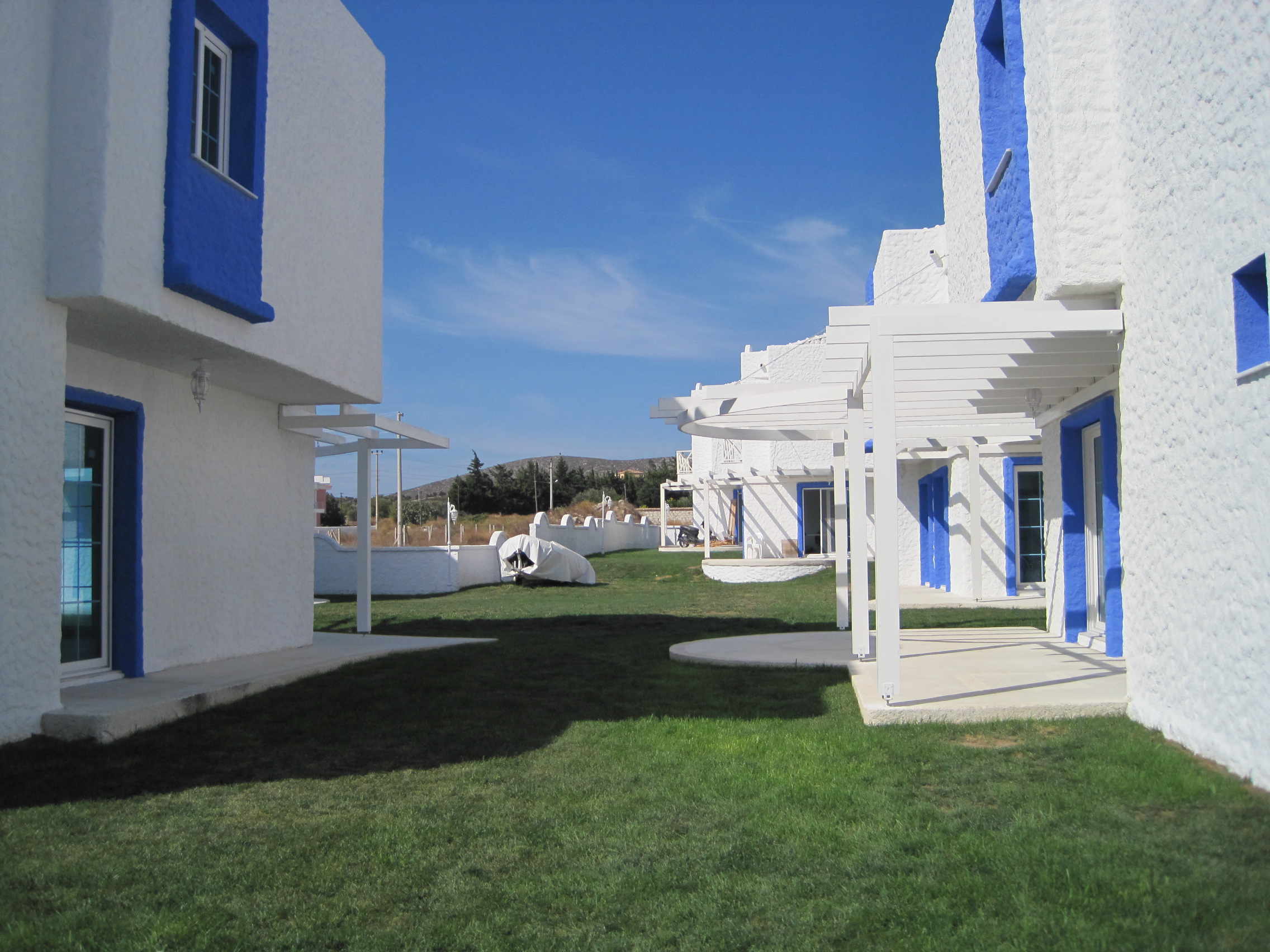
Modern architecture of Alaçatı

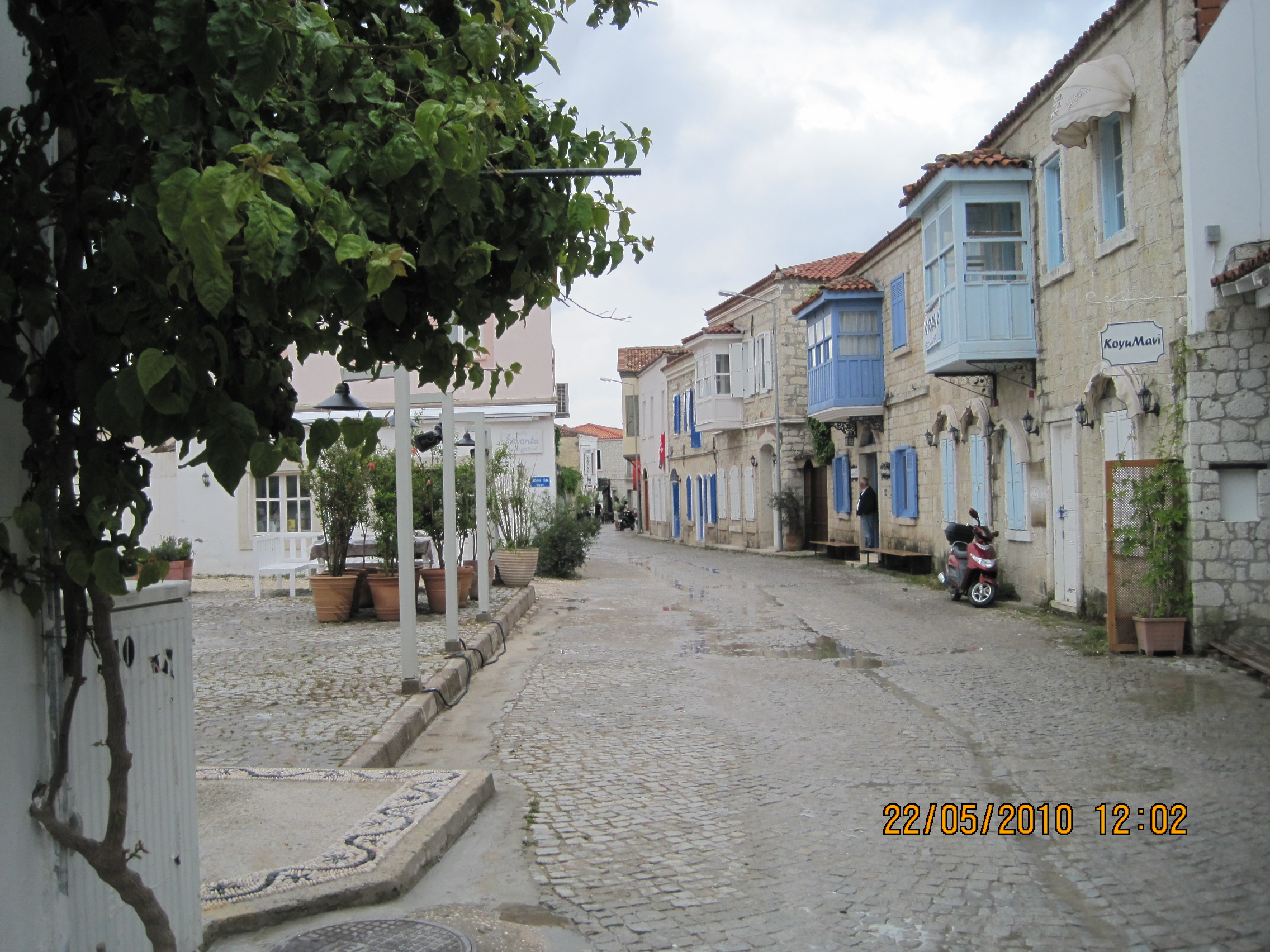
Alaçatı Centre

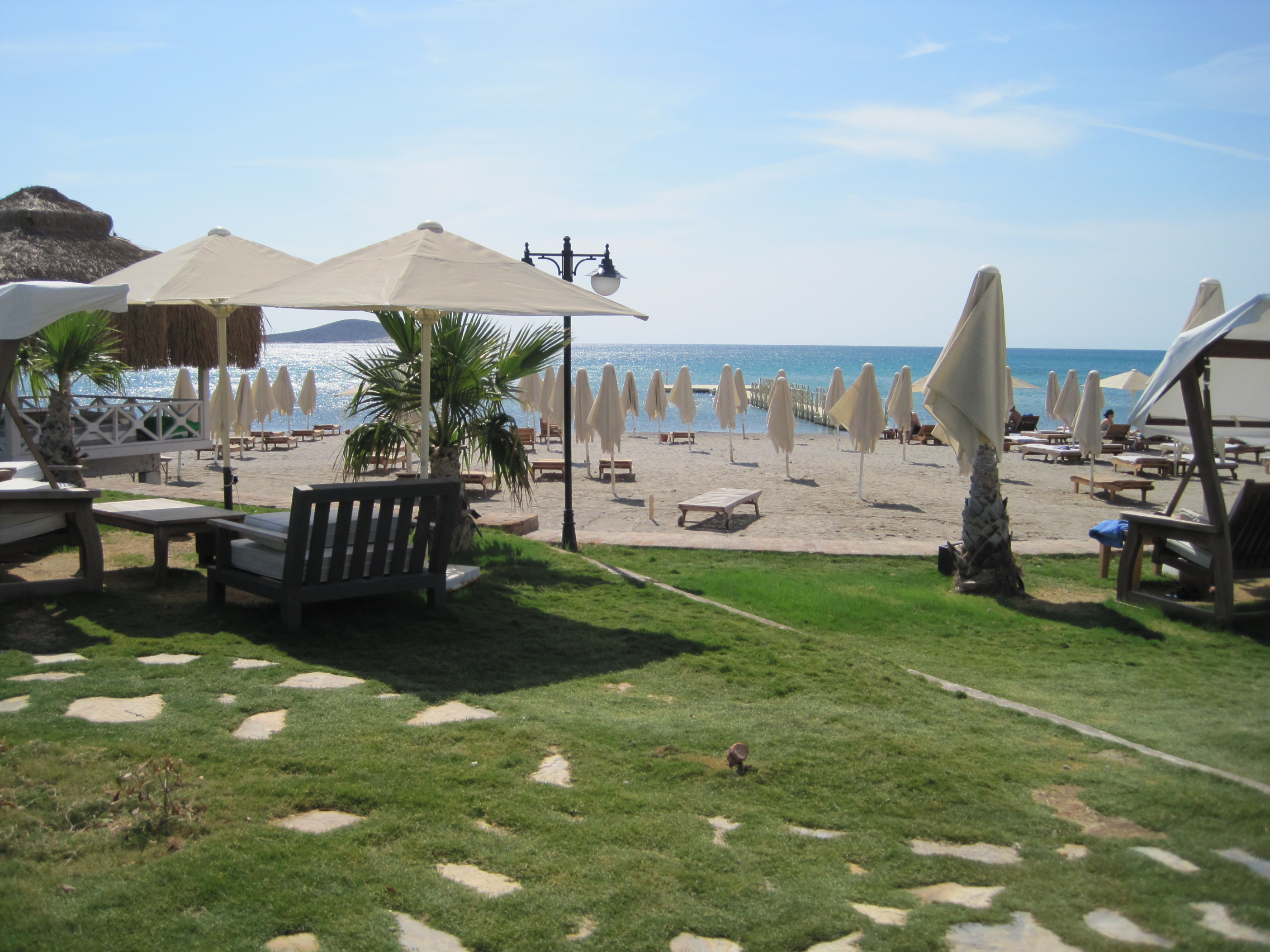

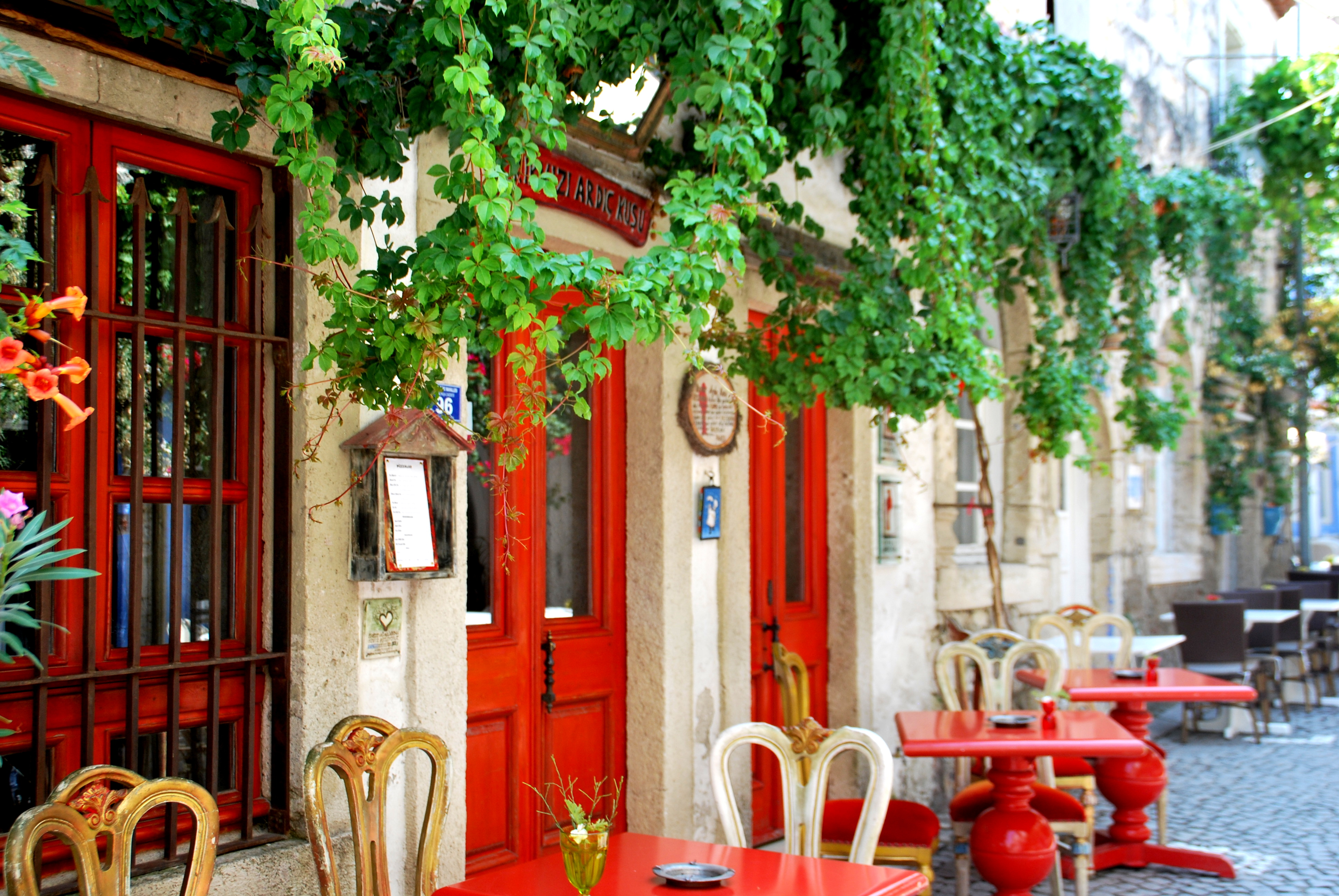
Alaçatı

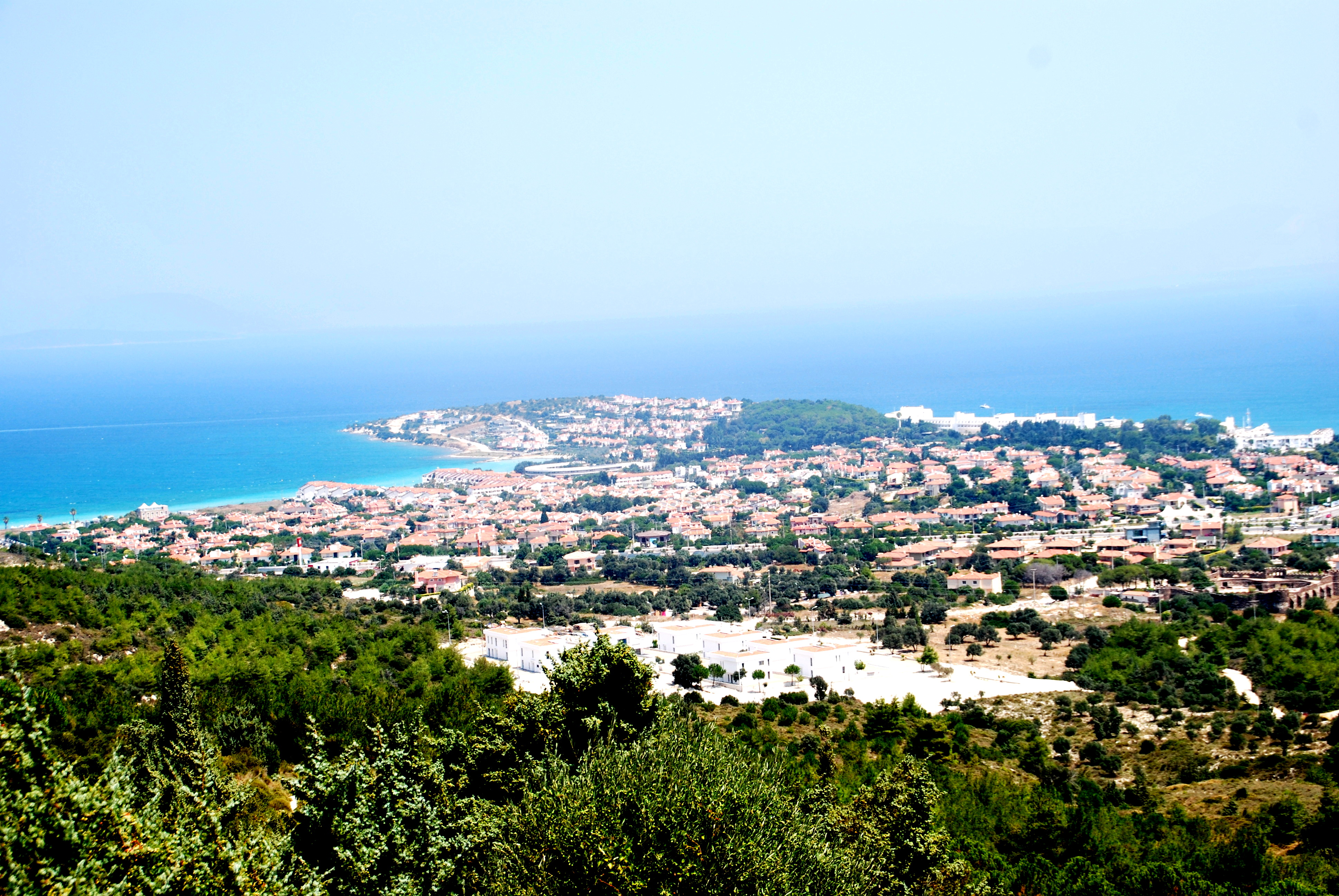
Cesme Altin Yunus

== See also ==
- Karaburun Peninsula, Turkey

== Sources ==
- "Çeşme, 31p" (PDF). www.izto.org.tr (in Turkish). İzmir Chamber of Commerce. 2007. Archived from the original (PDF) on 2010-12-28.
- Pat Yale; Jean-Bernard Carillet; Virginia Maxwell; Miriam Raphael (2005). Turkey, section "Çeşme". Lonely Planet. pp. 211. ISBN 1-74059-683-8.
- Dominic Whiting (2000). Turkey Handbook: The Travel Guide, section "Çeşme". Footprint Books, Bath. p. 260. ISBN 1-900949-85-7.
