= Erythrae =

Ruined city of the Ionian League in present day İzmir, Turkey

- Ἐρυθραί (Greek)
- Erythrai, Litri
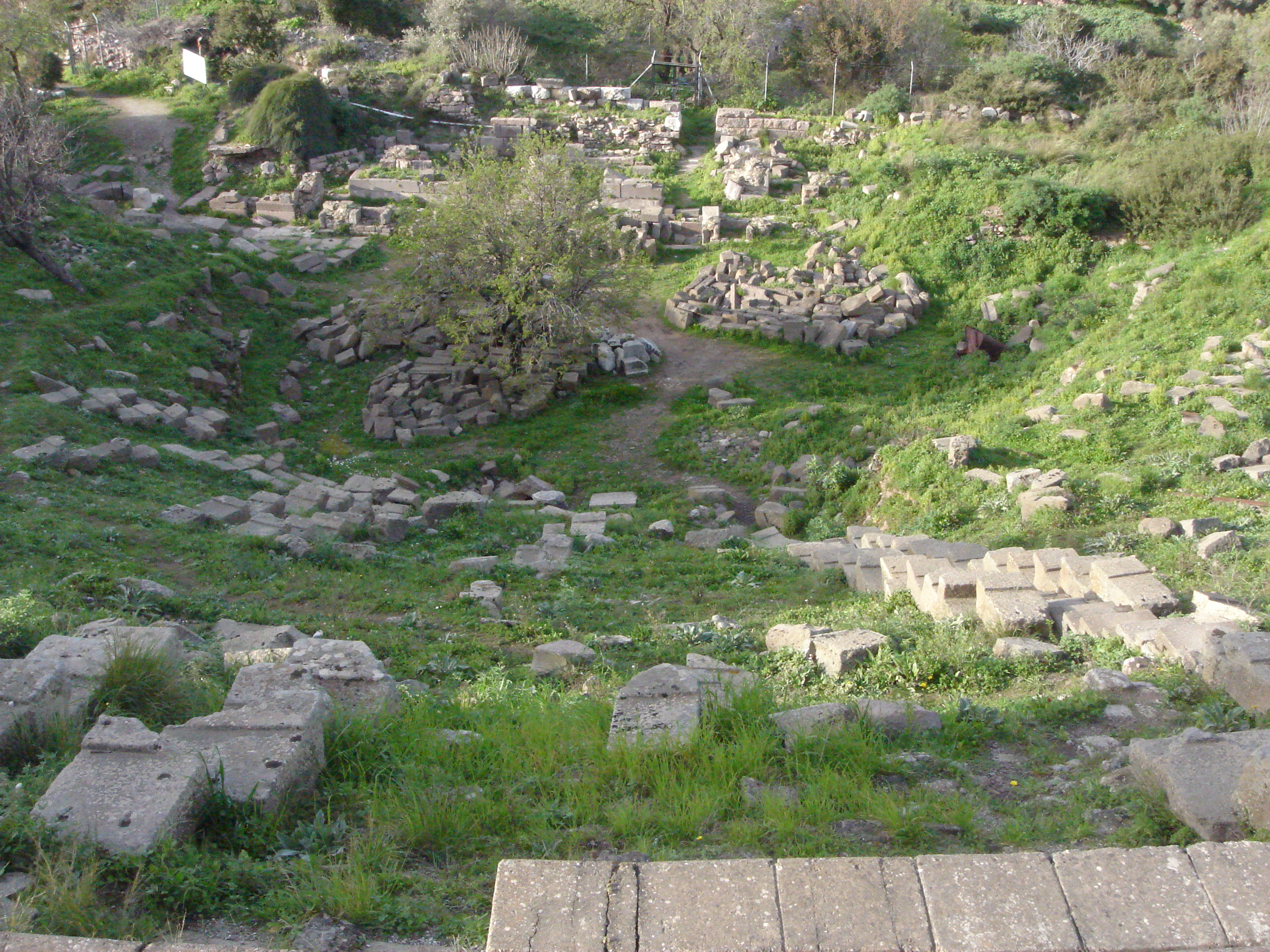
- Ruins of the theatre at Erythrae

- Location within Turkey
- 38°22′58″N 26°28′51″E
- Type: Settlement
- Associated with: Erythraean Sibyl
- Location: Ildırı, İzmir Province, Turkey
- Region: Ionia

Erythrae or Erythrai (Greek: Ἐρυθραί) later Lythri (Λυθρί, Turkish: Ildırı) was one of the twelve Ionian cities of Asia Minor, situated 22 km north-east of the port of Cyssus (modern name: Çeşme), on a small peninsula stretching into the Bay of Erythrae, at an equal distance from the mountains Mimas and Corycus, and directly opposite the island of Chios. It is recorded that excellent wine was produced in the peninsula. Erythrae was notable for being the seat of the Erythraean Sibyl. The ruins of the city are found north of the town Ildırı in the Çeşme district of İzmir Province, Turkey.

== History ==
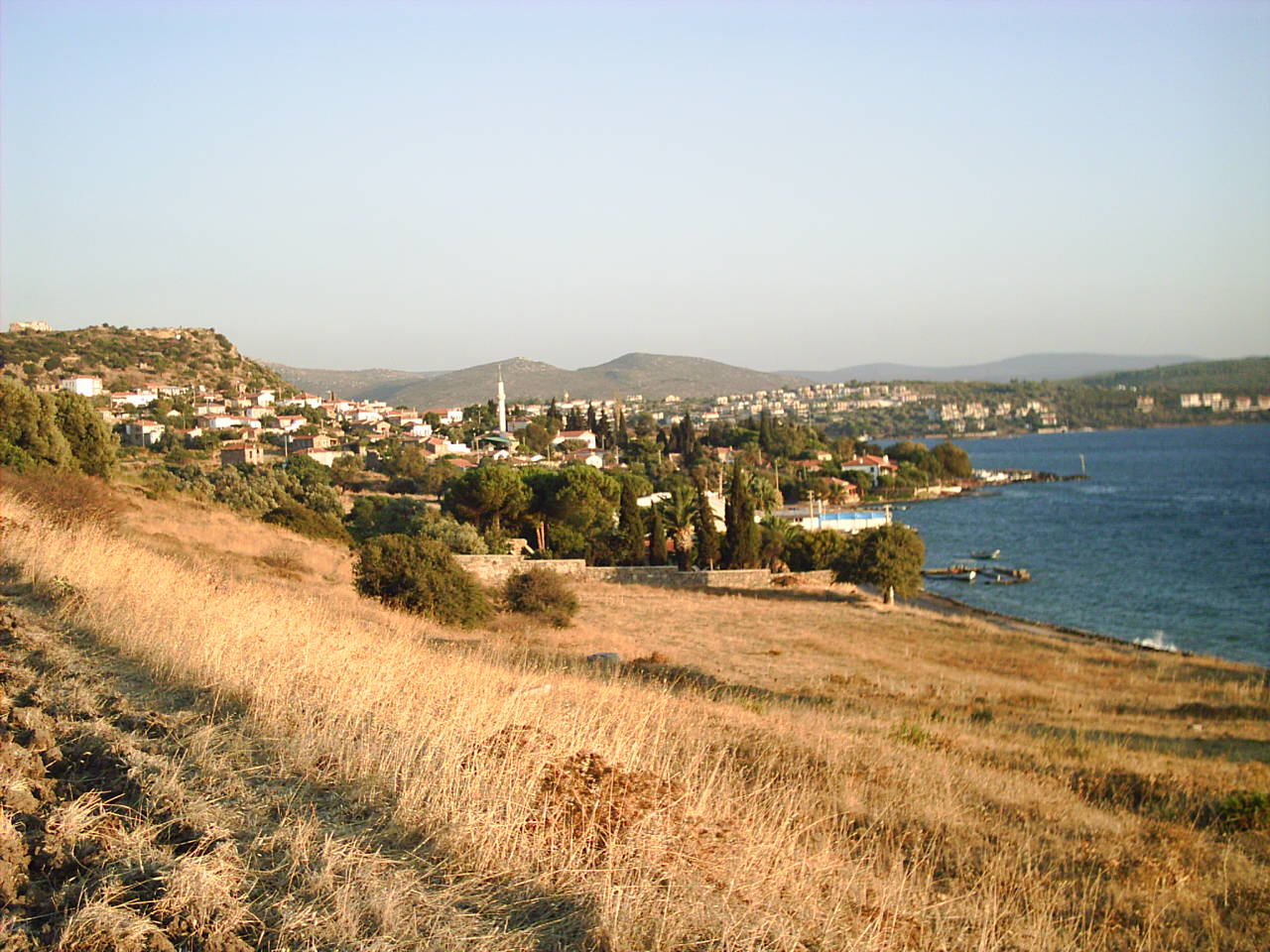
The bay at Ildırı in Çeşme district, formerly the bay of Erythrae

According to Pausanias (Paus. 7.3.7), the founder was Erythrus, the son of Rhadamanthus, who established himself here with a body of Cretans, Carians, and Lycians. At a later period came Knopos (Strab. 14.633), son of Codrus, with an Ionian colony, whence the city is sometimes called Cnopopolis (Κνωπούπολις). The city did not lie exactly on the coast, but some little distance inland, and had a harbor on the coast named Cissus (Livy, 36.43).

In the 7th century BC as an Ionian city of Asia Minor, Erythrae was a member of the Pan-Ionian League. Sometime during the 7th century, Erythrae fought a war against the neighbouring island of Chios. (Herodotus 1.18). The city gained fame as a producer of millstones during the period of tyrannical rule.

Erythrae was never a large city; it sent only eight ships to the Battle of Lade. The Erythraeans were for a considerable time subject to the supremacy of Athens, but towards the close of the Peloponnesian War they threw off their allegiance to that city. After the Battle of Cnidus, however, they received Conon, and paid him honours in an inscription, still extant.

Erythrae was the birthplace of two prophetesses (sibyls) – one of whom, Sibylla, is mentioned by Strabo as living in the early period of the city; the other, Athenais, lived in the time of Alexander the Great. The Erythraean Sibyl presided over the Apollonian oracle.

About 453 BC, Erythrae, refusing to pay tribute, seceded from the Delian League. A garrison and a new government restored the union, but late in the Peloponnesian War (412 BC) it revolted again with Chios and Clazomenae.

Later it was allied alternately with Athens and Persia. About the middle of the 4th century BC, the city became friendly with Mausolus: in an inscription found on the site, he is called a benefactor of Erythrae. About the same time the city signed a treaty with Hermias, Tyrant of Assus and Atarneus, based on reciprocal aid in the event of war.

In 334 BC the city regained its freedom through Alexander the Great who, according to Pliny (HN 5.116) and Pausanias (2.1.5), planned to cut a canal through the peninsula of Erythrae to connect Teos bay with the gulf of Smyrna.

When Alexander returned to Memphis in April 331 BC, envoys from Greece were waiting for him, saying that the oracles at Didyma and Erythrae, which had been silent for a long time, had suddenly spoken and confirmed that Alexander was the son of Zeus. The timing proves that Alexander was already thinking that he was of a more than human nature when he entered Greece: after all, the people of Didyma and Erythrae can never have known that Alexander was recognized as the son of Ra and wanted to be called 'son of Zeus'.

Erythrae was later associated with Pergamum and with Rome, and after the death of Attalos III in 133 BC, when the Pergamene kingdom was bequeathed to the Romans, it flourished as a free city ("civitas libera") attached to the Roman province of Asia.

At this time, Erythrae was renowned for its wine, goats, timber, and millstones, as well as its prophetic sibyls, Herophile and Athenais.

In the Roman period the city was plundered, and its importance faded after the earthquakes of that region in the 1st century AD.

The city experienced a revival of some sorts under the later Roman Empire and into the Byzantine period. Bishops are attested from 431 to 1292, and an archon, a minor governor, was based in the city in the 9th and 10th centuries.

Pausanias, at the Description of Greece writes that in the city there was a temple of Athena Polias and a huge wooden image of her sitting on a throne, she holds a distaff in either hand and wears a firmament on her head.

The people of Erythrae dedicated a statue of Epitherses (Ἐπιθέρσης) at Olympia, Greece. Epitherses was a native who won two boxing prizes at Olympic Games, two at Pythian Games and also victories at Nemean Games and the Isthmian Games. His father was Metrodorus (Μητρόδωρος).

== Recent times ==
From the mid-18th century until the early 20th century, Litri was a considerable place and port, extending from the ancient harbour to the acropolis. It attracted smaller coasting steamers, and there was an active trade with Chios and Smyrna (modern day İzmir).

== Remains ==
The archaeological site is situated within the settlement zone of the present-day Turkish village of Ildırı. The site was explored in depth in the 1960s by Professor Ekrem Akurgal, leading to precious discoveries, but has been left somewhat unattended since. The ruins include well-preserved Hellenistic walls with towers, of which five are still visible. The acropolis (280 ft) has a theatre on its northern slope, and eastwards lie many remains of Byzantine buildings.

== Notable people ==
- Naucrates (rhetorician), a Greek rhetorician and disciple of Isocrates.

== See also ==
- List of ancient Greek cities
- List of traditional Greek place names

== Attribution ==
Some of the text has been found on the website dedicated to the museum of The Temple of Athena in Erythrae which can be found in the external links section of this page.
