= Çandarlı (disambiguation) =

Çandarlı may mean

Place

- Çandarlı, a town in İzmir Province, Turkey

People

- Çandarlı Kara Halil Hayreddin Pasha Ottoman Grand vizier 1364-1387
- Çandarlı Ali Paşa Ottoman Grand vizier (1387-1406)
- Çandarlı (1.) İbrahim Paşa Ottoman Grand vizier (1421-1429)
- Çandarlı (2nd) Halil Pasha Ottoman Grand vizier (1439-1453)
- Çandarlı (2.) İbrahim Paşa Ottoman Grand vizier (1498-1499)
