= Koyunbaba (disambiguation) =

Koyunbaba is a Turkish nickname with the epithet meaning "sheep father". It may refer to:

- Koyunbaba, a 15th-century Turkish saint named Seyit Ali
- Koyunbaba Bridge, a historic arch bridge at Osmancık, Çorum in Turkey
- Koyunbaba, Kalecik, a village in Kalecik district of Ankara Province, Turkey
