= Çandarlı Halil Pasha the Younger =

Grand Vizier of the Ottoman Empire from 1439 to 1453

Çandarlı Halil Pasha

Grand Vizier of the Ottoman Empire
- In office 1439 – 1 June 1453
- Monarchs: Murad II; Mehmed II
- Preceded by: Koca Mehmed Nizamüddin Pasha
- Succeeded by: Zaganos Pasha

Personal details
- Died: 10 July 1453 Constantinople, Ottoman Empire (modern Turkey)
- Relations: Çandarlı family

Military service
- Allegiance: Ottoman Empire
- Battles/wars: Crusade of Varna; Battle of Varna; Conquest of Constantinople (executed)

Çandarlı Halil Pasha (died 10 July 1453), also known as the Younger, was the grand vizier of the Ottoman Empire from 1439 to 1453 under the sultans Murad II and, for the first few years of his reign, Mehmed II. A member of the Çandarlı family, he was the son of Grand Vizier Çandarlı Ibrahim Pasha the Elder and father of Grand Vizier Çandarlı Ibrahim Pasha the Younger.

He was appointed grand vizier in 1439 after the deposition of Nizamüddin Pasha. When Murad abdicated in 1444 in favor of the young Mehmed, Halil Pasha urged Murad to return to the throne. Murad returned, marched against the Crusaders, and won the Battle of Varna on 14 November. In 1445, Murad again left the throne to Mehmed. In 1446, during the Buçuktepe rebellion, Halil Pasha again organized the return of Murad, who remained on the throne until his death in 1451.

After Murad's death, Halil Pasha ensured the immediate transfer of power to Mehmed. He was against the siege of Constantinople under Murad and Mehmed. Halil Pasha was suspected of taking bribes from the Byzantines. After Mehmed captured Constantinople in 1453, Halil was removed from office and executed.

Halil Pasha enjoyed the unlimited trust of Murad II, but Mehmed, who had been deposed twice because of Halil Pasha, wanted to take revenge on him. According to the Turkish historian Y. Oztuna, the execution of Halil Pasha ended the struggle between the Turkish aristocratic party and the devshirme party, in which the latter emerged victorious.

== Biography ==
Halil Pasha was the fourth and penultimate member of the Çandarlı family to hold the position of grand vizier in the Ottoman Empire. His father, Çandarlı Ibrahim Pasha the Elder, his uncle, Çandarlı Ali Pasha, and his grandfather Çandarlı Halil Pasha the Elder had also held the position in the past. His own son, Çandarlı Ibrahim Pasha the Younger, would also become grand vizier in the future. Twice during his reign, sultan Murad II, a man more interested in religion and the arts than politics, retired to the city of Manisa. For the sultan's protection, Halil Pasha had a castle built in a nearby town, renaming it Çandarlı after his own family (the castle is still the most famous landmark in Çandarlı today). During these times of Murad II's retirement, Halil Pasha held effective control of the empire in the capital Edirne with Mehmed II, then still a child, as the nominal sultan. On both occasions, with the dangers presented by allied European armies attacking Ottoman territories, Çandarlı called back Murad II and deposed the teenaged Mehmed II to replace him with his more capable father. These two incidents led to lasting resentment by Mehmed II towards Çandarlı. The fact that the Çandarlı family had become extremely wealthy from their influence in the empire for over a century, possibly more so than even the ruling Ottoman family itself, further strained tensions between Mehmed II and Halil Pasha, the scion of the Çandarlı family.

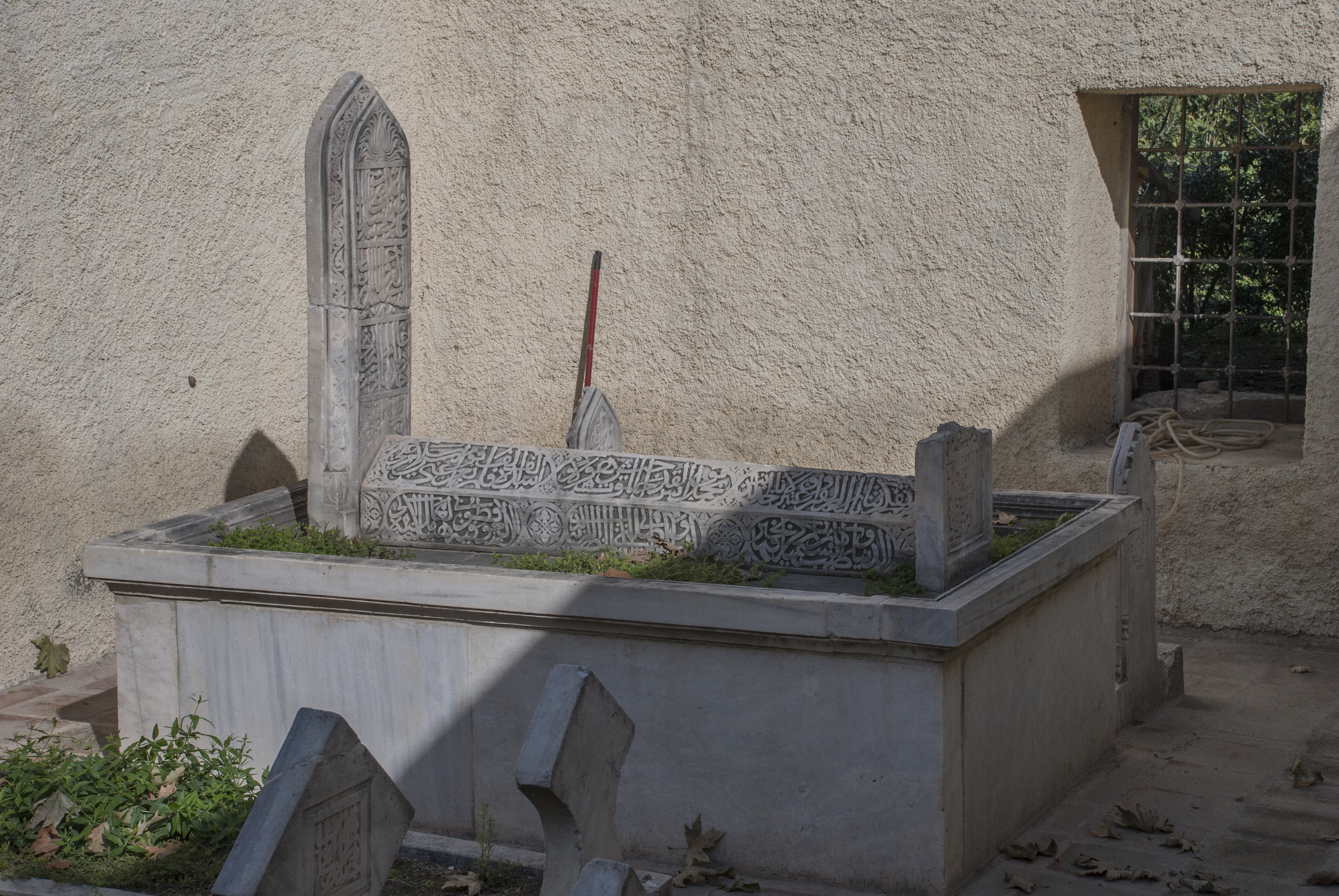
Tomb of Çandarlı Halil Pasha in İznik

When Mehmed II became sultan, the Byzantine emperor Constantine XI sent a messenger to the Ottomans, asking for an increase of the annuity of Mehmed II's cousin Orhan or otherwise to release him. Orhan was a distant Ottoman family member and could claim himself as pretender for the throne and potentially start a civil war. This strategy of disruption had been used by the Byzantines several times before. Halil Pasha became infuriated at the message and replied to the messengers:

You stupid Greeks, I have known your cunning ways for long enough. The late sultan was a lenient and conscientious friend to you. The present sultan Mehmed is not of the same mind. If Constantinople eludes his bold and impetuous grip, it will only be because God continues to overlook your devious and wicked schemes.

You are fools to think that you can frighten us with your fantasies when the ink on our recent treaty of peace is barely dry. We are not children without strength or sense. If you think that you can start something, do so. If you want to proclaim Orhan as sultan in Thrace, go ahead. If you want to bring the Hungarians across the Danube, let them come. If you want to recover places that you lost long since, try it.

But know this: you will make no headway in any of these things. All that you will do is lose what little you have.

In 1453, one of the first acts committed by the (then fully reigning) Sultan Mehmed II immediately after the conquest of Constantinople was to imprison Çandarlı Halil Pasha. The city had been taken on 29 May 1453 and Halil Pasha's imprisonment took place on 1 June 1453. His execution followed on 10 July 1453 and he was buried in İznik in an open tomb without a roof unlike his ancestors.

Mehmed II thus ended the Çandarlı era in the Ottoman Empire, and the later members of the family became no more than provincial notables based in İznik, although they were to give yet another, short-term, grand vizier to the Ottoman Empire at the end of the 15th century (Halil's son Çandarlı Ibrahim Pasha the Younger).

Çandarlı Halil Pasha was, as such, the first Ottoman grand vizier to be executed by the sultan.

== Popular culture ==
- Reşit Gürzap portrayed Halil Pasha in the 1951 Turkish film The Conquest of Constantinople.
- Halil Pasha is played by Erden Alkan in Turkish film Fetih 1453 (2012).
- Halil Pasha appears in the historical novel Porphyry and Ash. The speech he delivers to the Byzantine Emperor is the same as that made by the real Halil Pasha as recorded by George Sphrantzes
- Halil Pasha is played by Selim Bayraktar in Netflix series Rise of Empires: Ottoman.
- Halil Pasha appears as an antagonist in Kiersten White's novel And I Darken (2016)
- Once again, Selim Bayraktar plays Candarli Halil Pasha in Mehmed: Fetihler Sultani.
- Halil Pasha is played by Serkan Çolak in the historical television series, Rise of the Raven (2025).

== See also ==
- Çandarlı family
- Çandarlı, a town named by Halil Pasha
- List of Ottoman grand viziers

Political offices
Preceded by Koca Mehmed Nizamüddin Pasha	Grand Vizier of the Ottoman Empire; 1439–1453	Succeeded by Zagan Pasha
