= Çandarlı Ibrahim Pasha the Elder =

Grand Vizier of the Ottoman Empire from 1421 to 1429

Çandarlı Ibrahim Pasha

Grand Vizier of the Ottoman Empire
- In office 1421 – August 15, 1429
- Monarch: Murad II
- Preceded by: Bayezid Pasha
- Succeeded by: Koca Mehmed Nizamüddin Pasha

Personal details
- Died: August 15, 1429 Edirne, Ottoman Empire

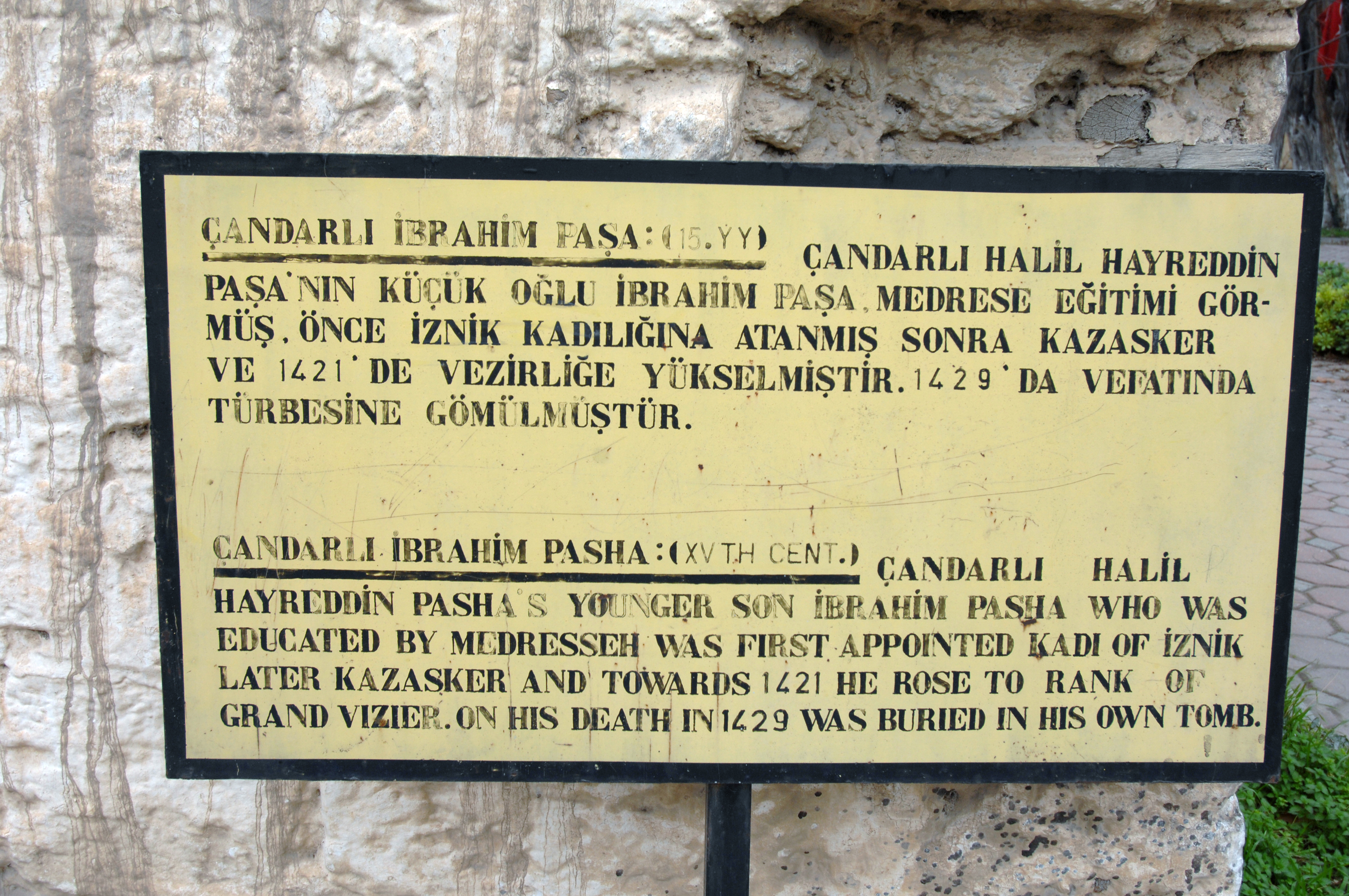
Picture taken at the spot where Çandarlı Ibrahim Pasha was buried

Çandarlı Ibrahim Pasha (Ottoman Turkish: چندارلی ابراهیم پاشا; died August 15, 1429), sometimes called the Elder, was an Ottoman statesman who served as grand vizier of the Ottoman Empire under Murad II, from 1421 to 1429.

He was the third member of the prominent Çandarlı family to become grand vizier, after his father Çandarlı Halil Pasha the Elder and his brother Çandarlı Ali Pasha. His son, Çandarlı Halil Pasha the Younger and his namesake grandson, Çandarlı Ibrahim Pasha the Younger, also became grand viziers.

He was married to Lady Isfahan Shah Khatun (died c. 1436), a direct descendant of Sheikh Edebali. She was the mother of all his children, except the eldest, Halil Pasha. She established a madrasa in Jerusalem: the al-'Uthmaniyya.

== See also ==
- Çandarlı family
- List of Ottoman grand viziers

== Bibliography ==
- Burak, Guy (2013). "Dynasty, Law, and the Imperial provincial Madrasa: the case of Al-Madrasa Al-ʿUthmaniyya in Ottoman Jerusalem". Int. J. Middle East Stud. 45: 111–125. doi:10.1017/S0020743812001286. S2CID 163499692.

Political offices
Preceded by Bayezid Pasha	Grand Vizier of the Ottoman Empire; 1421–1429	Succeeded by Koca Mehmed Nizamüddin Pasha
