= Paidomazoma =

In modern Greek history, paidomazoma (Greek: παιδομάζωμα; "gathering of children") may refer to:

- Devşirme, the practice of forced recruitment of Christian boys under the Ottoman Empire
- Paidomazoma (Greek Civil War), the forced evacuation of children from communist-held parts of Greece in 1948/1949
