= Koca Mehmed Pasha =

Koca Mehmed Pasha may refer to:

- Koca Dervish Mehmed Pasha (died 1655), Ottoman grand vizier (1652–1653) and Kapudan Pasha (1652)
- Koca Hüsrev Mehmed Pasha (1769–1855), Ottoman grand vizier (1839–1841) and Kapudan Pasha (1823–1827)
- Koca Mehmed Nizamüddin Pasha (died 1439), Ottoman grand vizier (1429–1438)
- Koca Ragıp Mehmet Pasha (1698–1763), Ottoman grand vizier (1757–1763)
