= Çandarlı family =

Turkish noble family

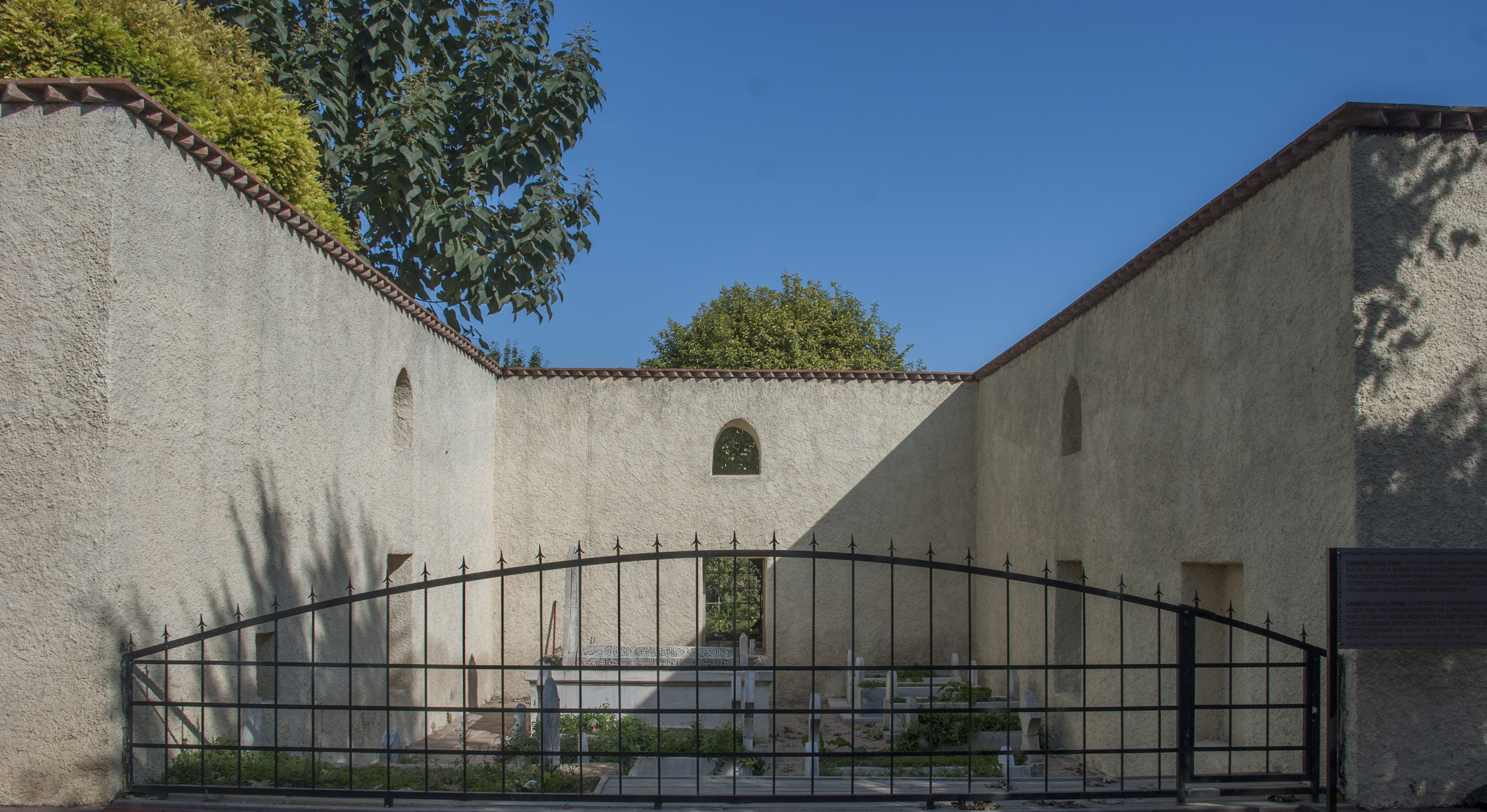
The mausoleum of the Çandarlı family in Iznik

The Çandarlı family (Ottoman Turkish: چندرلی عائله‌سی; Turkish: Çandarlı ailesi) was a prominent Turkish political family which provided the Ottoman Empire with five grand viziers during the 14th and 15th centuries. At the time, it was the second most important family after the Ottoman dynasty itself.

== Background and history ==
In contrast to European monarchies, aside from the Ottoman dynasty, the Ottoman Empire had no aristocracy. There was no difference between the noble birth and the humble birth and everybody had equal chance to reach high ranks. The only prerequisite for an official appointment was conversion to Islam. However, families like the Çandarlı or, for example, the Köprülü were able to gain favor with the royal family, creating multi-generational political dynasties and amassing large amounts of wealth.

The roots of the family can be traced back to the village of Çandar, now called Cendere, part of Ankara Province, Turkey in Central Anatolia. The family was of Turkoman nomadic Turkish origin. After the foundation of the Ottoman beylik, the precursor to the Ottoman Empire, the family settled in İznik, ancient Nicaea; today in Bursa Province, Turkey. They were the members of Ahi tradition and in the early years of the beylik, one member of the family became kadı of Bilecik in 1326. Between 1365 and 1499, five members of the family became grand viziers. In a period of 88 years, during the first four between 1365 and 1453, the Çandarlı family held the post for 64 years, a feat unparalleled in Ottoman history.

Kara Halil Hayreddin Pasha was first judge of Bursa and then the family's first Grand Vizier.

In the early 15th century, Çandarlı Halil Pasha the Younger a member of the family, had a castle for sultan Murad II built in Aegean sideside town occupying the site of the ancient Greek city of Pitane, renaming it Çandarlı after his family. Çandarlı is now a resort town in İzmir Province of Turkey.

== Decline in 1453 ==
Sultan Mehmed II disliked his late father's grand vizier Çandarlı Halil Pasha the Younger, whom he had inherited from his father Murad II upon his succession to the throne in 1451. After conquering Constantinople in 1453, he had Halil executed, making him the first of many grand viziers to be executed. After Halil, four of his grand viziers were of devşirme (i.e. non-Turkish and non-Muslim) origin. There was indeed a rise in slave administrators, who were much easier to control.

== Later years ==
Although a fifth member of the Çandarlı family, Çandarlı Ibrahim Pasha the Younger, was able to reach the post of grand vizier during the reign of Bayezid II in 1498, the family never fully recovered from the shock of 1453. In later years, two other members of the family also worked for the empire; İsa Pasha (d. 1549) and Halil Bey (d. 1568) served in the imperial bureaucracy, but they were unable to become part of the Sublime Porte, the central imperial government.

== List of Grand Viziers from the family ==
Name	Term of office	Sultan(s)
Çandarlı Kara Halil Hayreddin Pasha	1364–1387	Murad I
Çandarlızade Ali Pasha	1387–1406	Murad I, Bayezid I, Süleyman Çelebi (Ottoman Interregnum)
Çandarlı Ibrahim Pasha the Elder	1421–1429	Murad II
Çandarlı Halil Pasha the Younger (Note: The first grand vizier to be executed)	1439–1453	Murad II, Mehmed II
Çandarlı Ibrahim Pasha the Younger	1498–1499	Bayezid II

== Sources ==
- Aktepe, Münir (1993). "Çandarlı". TDV Encyclopedia of Islam, Vol. 8 (Ci̇lve – Dârünnedve) (in Turkish). Istanbul: Presidency of Religious Affairs, Centre for Islamic Studies. pp. 209–211. ISBN 978-975-389-435-7.
- Kastritsis, Dimitris J. (2015). "Çandarlı family". In Fleet, Kate; Krämer, Gudrun; Matringe, Denis; Nawas, John; Rowson, Everett (eds.). Encyclopaedia of Islam (3rd ed.). Brill Online. doi:10.1163/1573-3912_ei3_COM_24605. ISSN 1873-9830.
- Ménage, V. L. (1965). "D̲j̲andarli̊". In Lewis, B.; Pellat, Ch. & Schacht, J. (eds.). The Encyclopaedia of Islam, Second Edition. Volume II: C–G. Leiden: E. J. Brill. pp. 444–445. doi:10.1163/1573-3912_islam_SIM_1990. OCLC 495469475.
