= Green Mosque, İznik =

Mosque in İznik, Turkey

Green Mosque
- Yeşil Camii
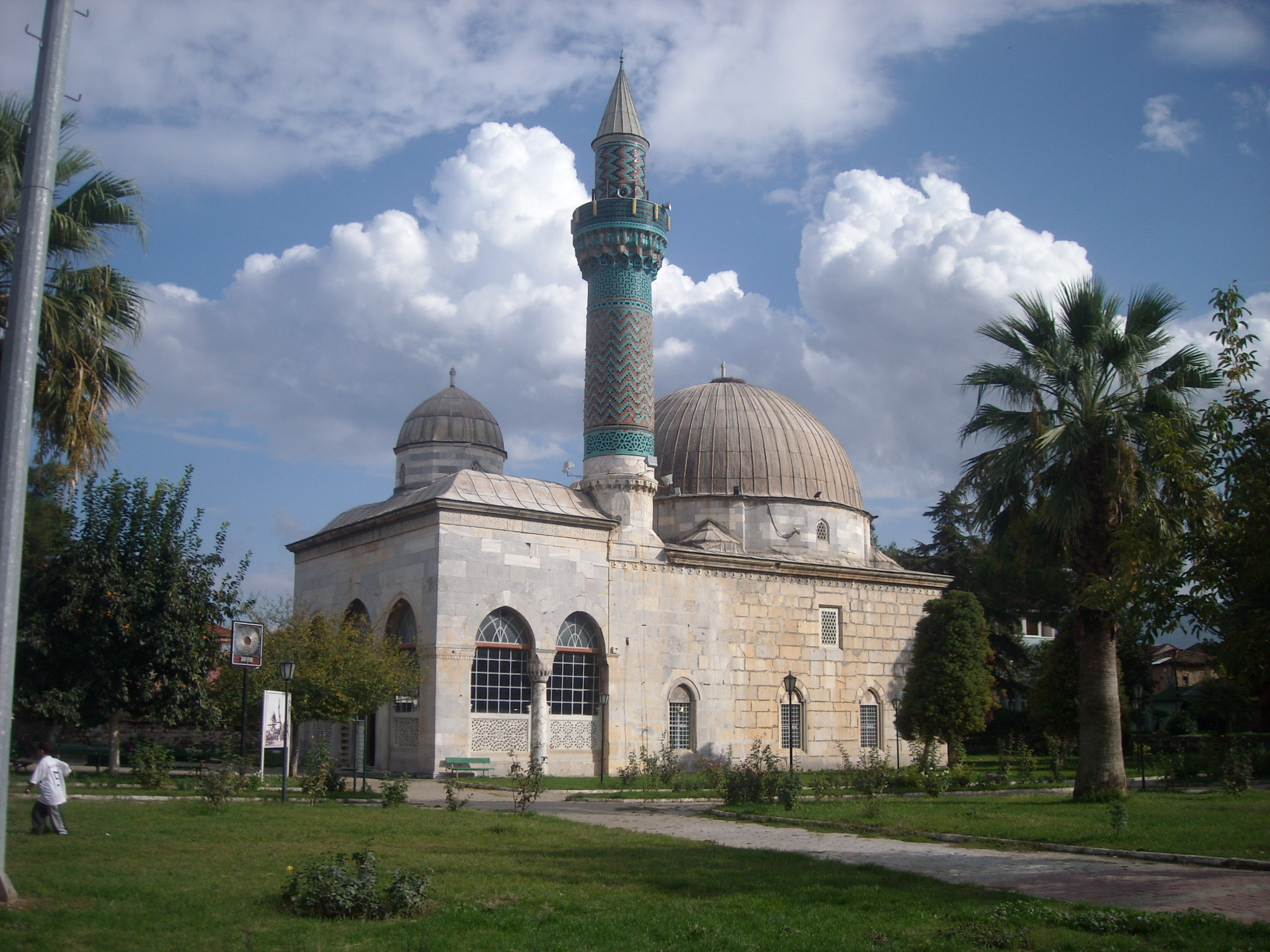

- Location of the mosque in Turkey

Religion
- Affiliation: Islam
- Ecclesiastical or organisational status: Mosque
- Status: Active

Location
- Location: İznik
- Country: Turkey
- Coordinates: 40°25′47″N 29°43′37″E

Architecture
- Architect: Hacı Musa
- Type: Mosque architecture
- Style: Ottoman
- Groundbreaking: 1378
- Completed: 1391

Specifications
- Dome: Two (maybe more)
- Dome dia. (outer): 10.5 m (34 ft)
- Minaret: One
- Minaret height: 25 m (82 ft)

The Green Mosque (Turkish: Yeşil Camii) is a historic Ottoman mosque, located in İznik, Turkey.

== Architecture ==
One of the earliest examples of Ottoman architecture, the Yeşil Mosque was constructed by order of the Grand Vizier Çandarlı Kara Halil Hayreddin Pasha of Sultan Murad I in Iznik. It was later completed by his son Ali Pasha. The inscription on the mosque gives the date of construction as 780 AH (1378/1379 CE) to 794 AH (1391/1392 CE), and the name of the architect as Haci bin Musa.

The Yeşil Mosque is located near the Lefke Gate on the eastern edge of the city. It is composed of a three-bay portico and a single prayer hall covered with a single dome measuring 10.5 m (34 ft) in diameter. The height of the dome is 17.5 m (57 ft) above the floor. It has four windows and the lower portion of the interior walls are coated with gray marble panels. The mosque has a single minaret in the northwestern corner of the building which is decorated with composed glazed terra-cotta green, yellow, turquoise and dark purple coloured tiles. The colourful tiles of the minaret gives the mosque its name: Yeşil (green in Turkish).

The mosque was damaged in 1922 by the Greek army during the Turkish War of Independence. The mosque was restored between 1956 and 1969.

== Gallery ==
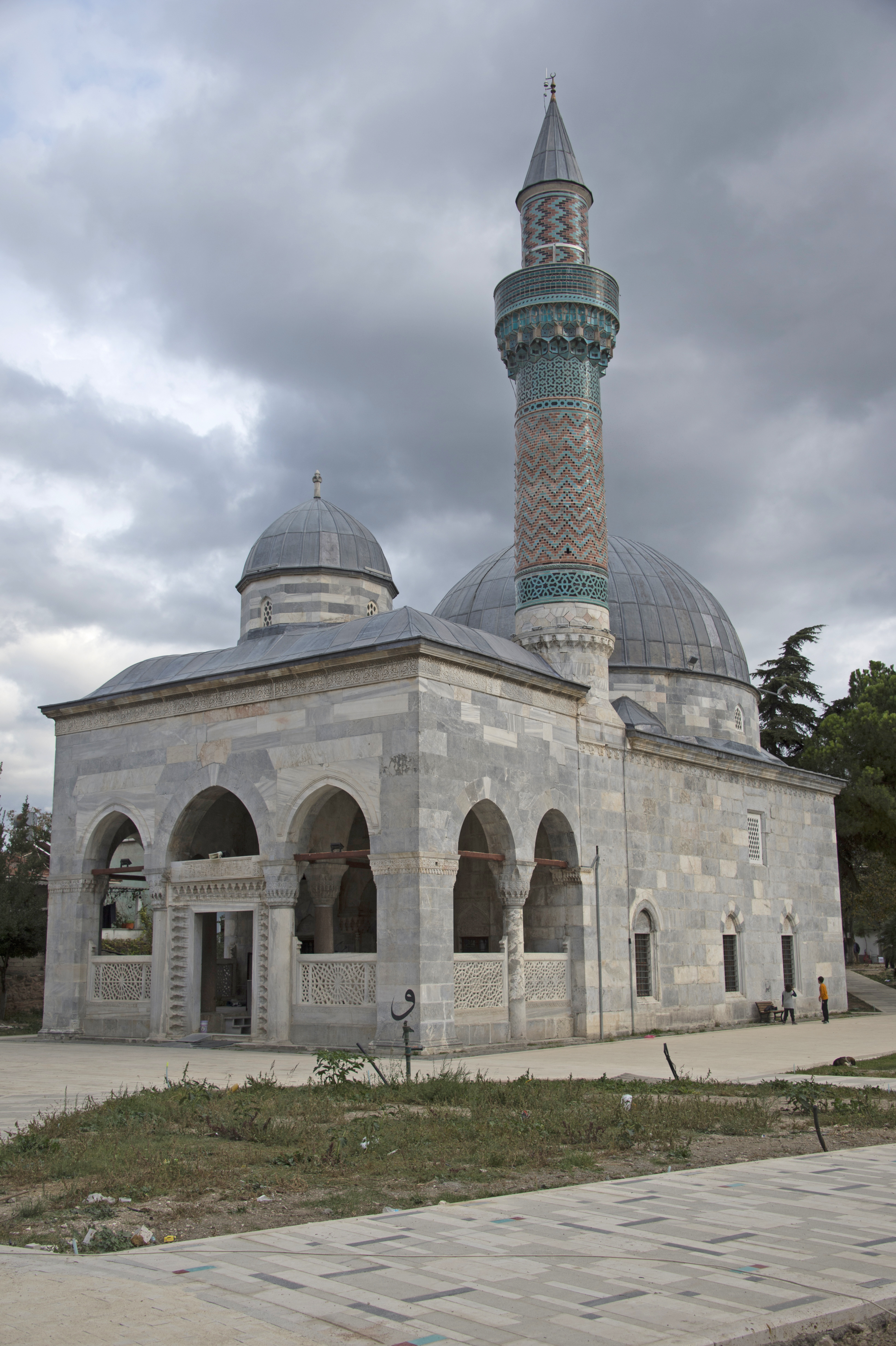
Exterior

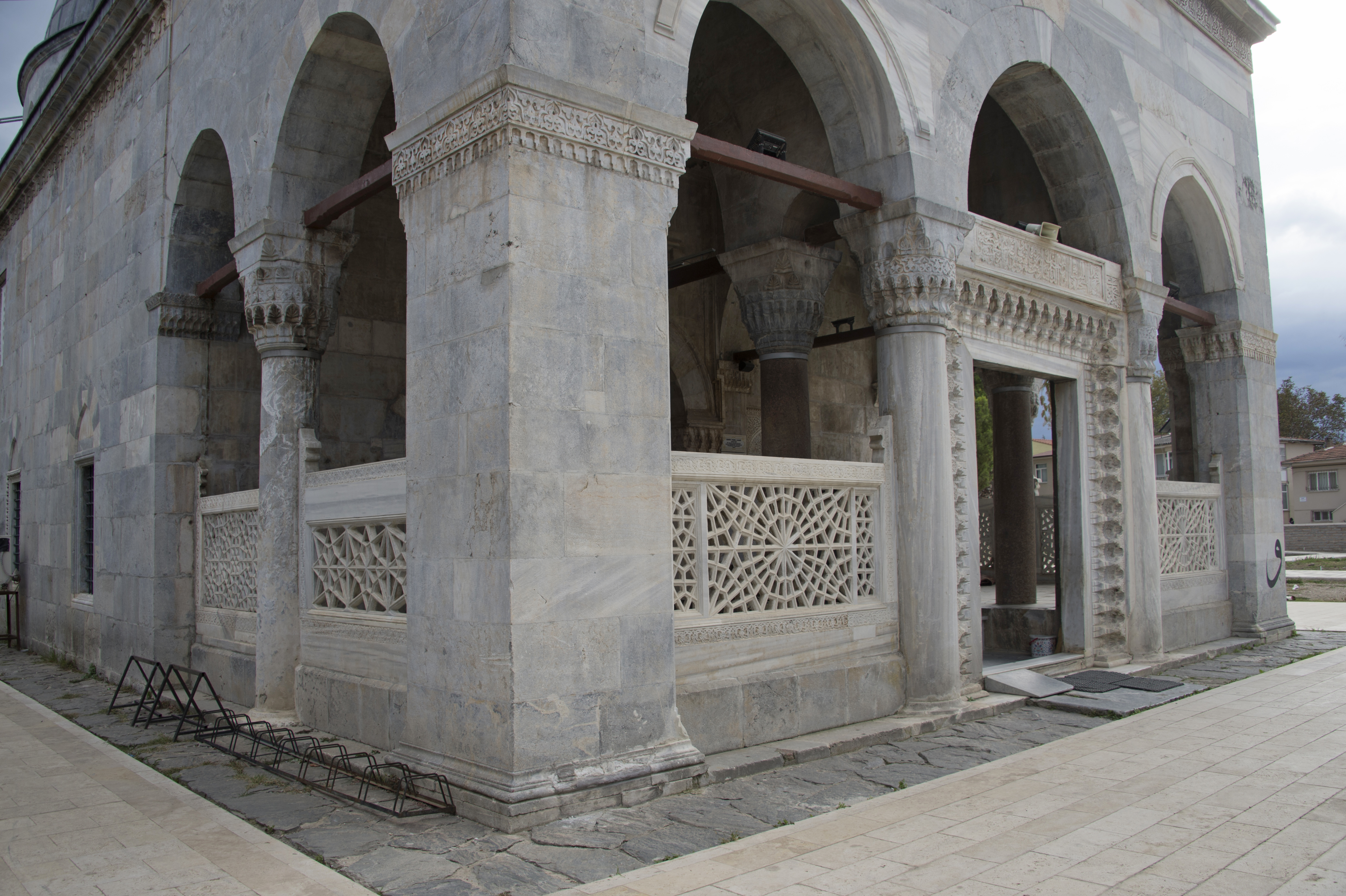
Exterior

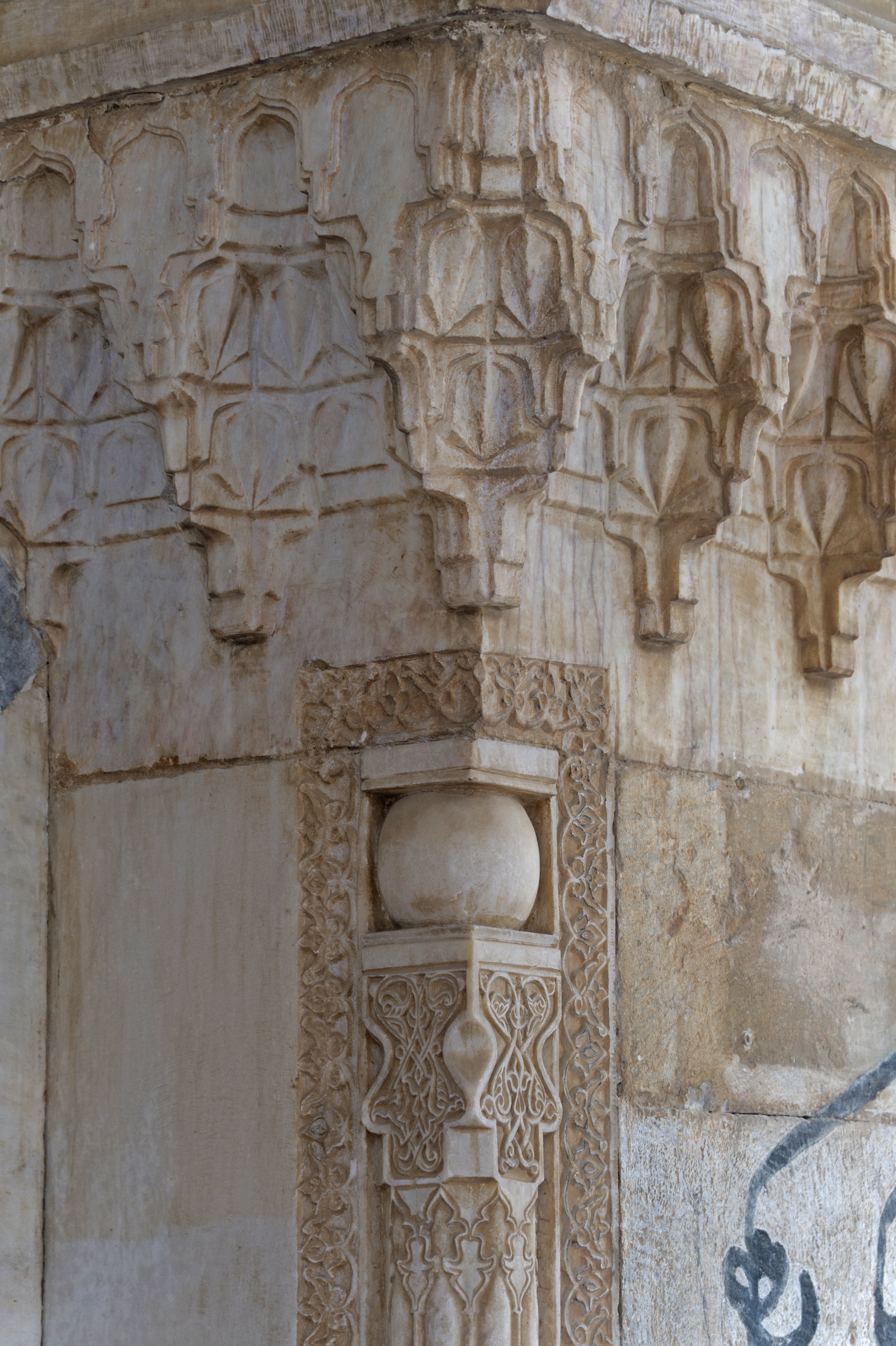
Exterior decoration

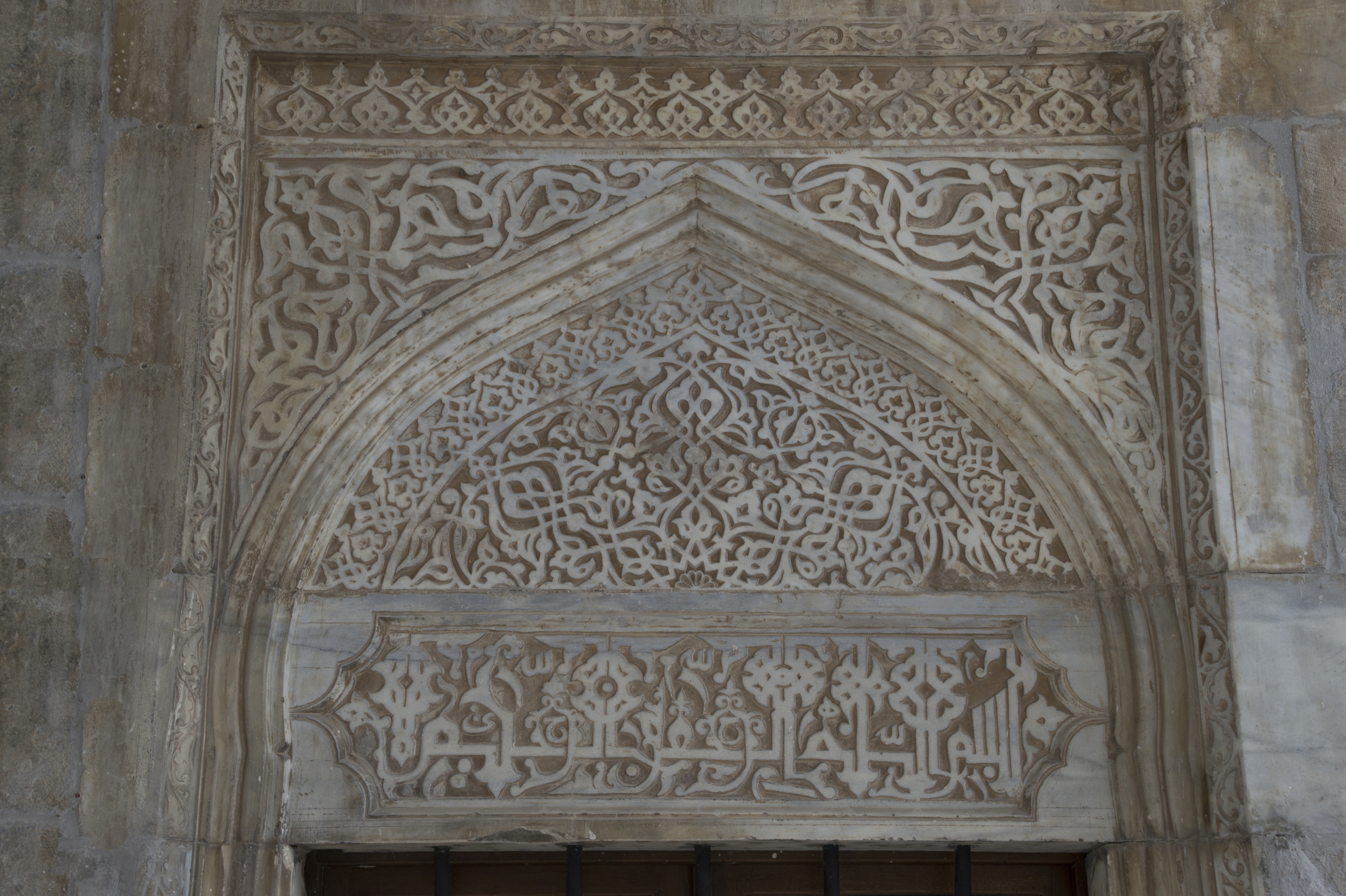
Exterior decoration above entrance

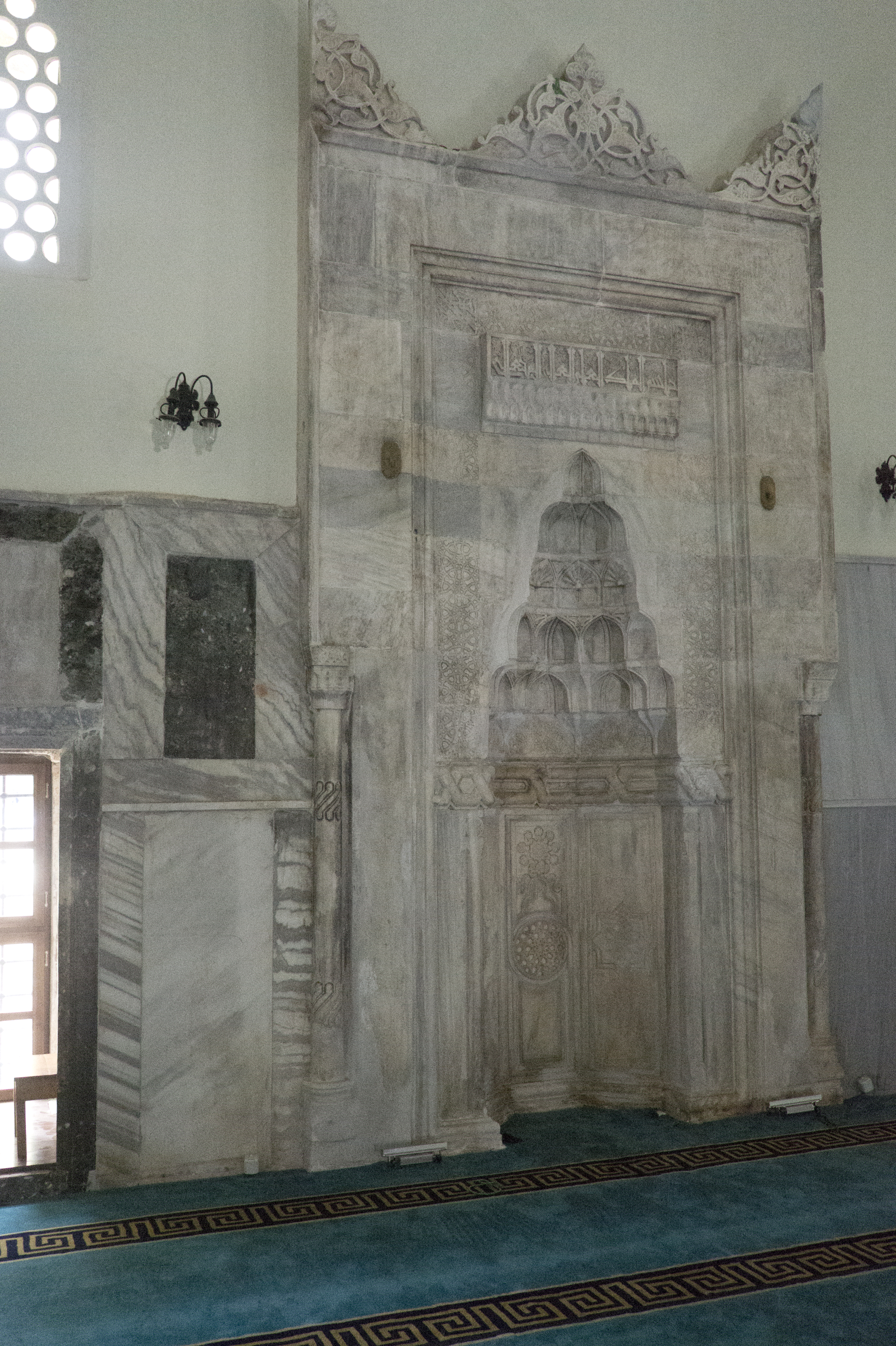
Interior with minber

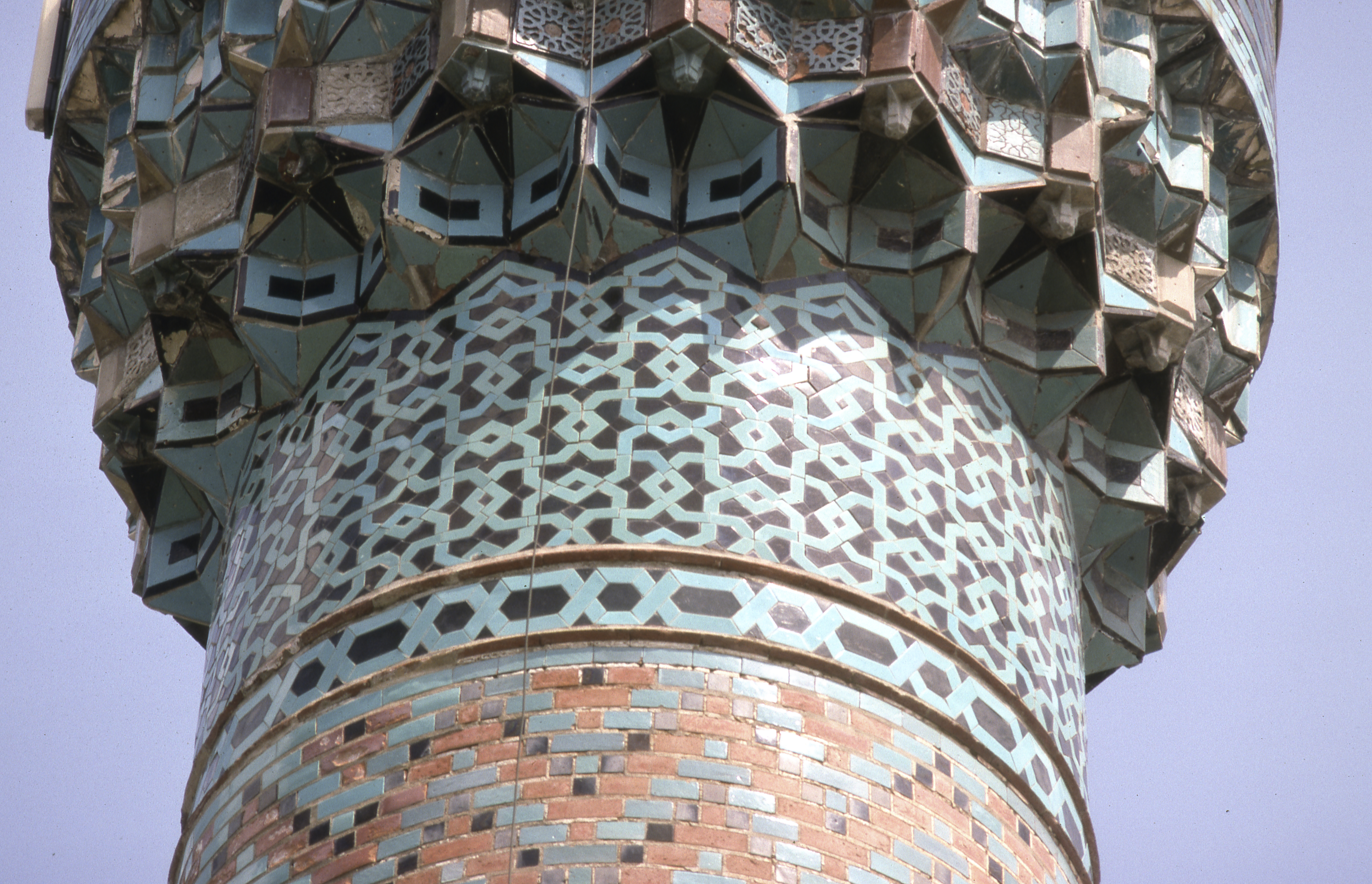
Minaret

== See also ==
- Islam in Turkey
- List of mosques in Turkey
