= Killing of Şenay Aybüke Yalçın =

Turkish teacher killed by Kurdish militants (PKK)

Şenay Aybüke Yalçın
- Born: September 3, 1994; Osmancık, Çorum, Turkey
- Died: June 9, 2017 (aged 22); Kozluk, Batman, Turkey
- Cause of death: Gunshot wound
- Resting place: Osmancık, Çorum
- Citizenship: Turkish
- Education: Necmettin Erbakan University
- Occupation: Music teacher

Şenay Aybüke Yalçın (3 September 1994 – 9 June 2017) was a Turkish teacher. In 2016, she was appointed as a music teacher at Kozluk Multi-Program Anatolian High School in the Kozluk district of Batman. She died in 2017 after being struck by a bullet during an attack by the Kurdistan Workers' Party (PKK) targeting the mayor of Kozluk.

After Aybüke Yalçın was killed by the PKK, various institutions and places across the country were named in her memory, and competitions and tournaments were organized in her honor. A film about her life was released in 2023.

== Life ==
Şenay was born on September 3, 1994, in the Osmancık district of Çorum. Her name was given by her parents, who were deeply affected by the death of a young girl in a cartoon depicting the Khojaly Massacre. They combined the name of the character, Aybüke, with her paternal grandmother's name, Şenay.

She graduated from Körfez Anatolian High School. During this time, she received music education at the Edremit Culture and Arts Association. Later, she graduated from Necmettin Erbakan University's Music Teaching Department. In 2016, she was appointed as a music teacher at Kozluk Multi-Program Anatolian High School in the Kozluk district of Batman. She was also a scout leader.

== Death ==
On 9 June 2017, after distributing report cards to her students, she and four friends got into a car and drove off. A PKK attacker, waiting in a taxi he had hijacked on a side road in the town center, opened fire with a long-range weapon on a vehicle belonging to Mayor Veysi Işık as it passed in front of him. Although the mayor's car attempted to maneuver and escape, the attacker continued firing at the vehicle. Yalçın was close to the scene during the attack, and several of the bullets struck her. She was taken to Kozluk State Hospital with severe injuries and died shortly after. Her body was transported to her birthplace, Osmancık, where she was buried.

== Perpetrators ==
The person who carried out the attack fled the area. When he arrived in front of the Bekirhan Gendarmerie Station during his escape, the gendarmerie shouted "Stop!" but he did not heed the warning and detonated the vehicle he was in. On March 22, 2018, it was announced that the PKK member codenamed "Agit," who had prepared the bomb device, was killed in a gendarmerie operation in the rural area of Sason district. Additionally, in the case related to the attack, five people were sentenced to 18 years in prison for "providing weapons to a terrorist organization" by the Batman 3rd Heavy Penal Court.

== Memory ==
After her death, her name was given to the Kozluk Multi-Program Anatolian High School where she worked, the Körfez Anatolian High School from which she graduated, the Hospital Street where the attack took place, and the orchestra hall at Necmettin Erbakan University, from which she also graduated. Across Turkey, her name has been given to a middle school in Osmancık, a public library in Batman, a guesthouse in Kozluk, the library of a school in Bozbulut village in Muş, a library in Dörtyol, an art workshop at a high school in Pozantı, an overpass in Safranbolu, a street in Çankaya, a classroom at Batman University, and a public library in Keçiören. Additionally, her name has been given to three kindergartens and a nursery in Hatay, Karabük, and Ankara. In Çorum, a cultural center and an art center at a high school were opened in her memory. On May 2, 2023, Recep Tayyip Erdoğan announced that an oil well discovered on Küpeli Mountain would be named after the teacher.

In her memory, a table tennis tournament was held in 2017, a Turkish folk music solo singing competition took place in 2018, and a volleyball tournament was organized in 2021. The film "Aybüke: I Became a Teacher" which tells the story of Yalçın's life, was released on November 24, 2023.

== See also ==
- Death of Eren Bülbül
