= Death of Eren Bülbül =

2017 killing of a Turkish child by PKK

Eren Bülbül
- Born: 1 January 2002; Maçka, Trabzon, Turkey
- Died: 11 August 2017 (aged 15); Maçka, Trabzon, Turkey
- Cause of death: Gunshot wound
- Resting place: Maçka, Trabzon

Eren Bülbül (1 January 2002 – 11 August 2017) was a Turkish 15-year-old boy from Maçka, Trabzon who was killed by the PKK during a clash with Turkish security forces. The incident was part of the wider Turkish-PKK conflict.

== Life ==
The son of Ayşe and Hasan Bülbül, Bülbül was one of 12 children. He spent his entire life in Maçka, Trabzon, as he went to local Çatak Primary School and later Maçka Anatolian Religious High School. His father died in 2016. He worked in his family's farm and liked sports, being a fan of Trabzonspor.

== Death ==
On 11 August 2017, a group of PKK militants entered a house to obtain supplies after clashes with police. Bülbül saw them and informed the gendarmerie. He accompanied the police, showing them the house which the militants had entered. As a result of an attack by the PKK, both Bülbül and Gendarmerie Sergeant Major Ferhat Gedik were killed. After his death, 41 bullets were taken out from Gedik's body.

=== Reactions ===
Later, Eren's mother Ayşe Bülbül said that his death had become the sorrow of the whole country. Additionally, his mother criticised the Turkish security forces who had taken her son with them to show where the PKK militants were hiding, saying: "My son would've liked to be a martyr but a martyr in the military, not in front of his door." The party leader of the Republican Peoples' Party (CHP) Kemal Kiliçdaroğlu as well as Serpil Kemalbay of the Peoples Democratic Party (HDP) condemned the death of Bülbül.

== Legacy ==
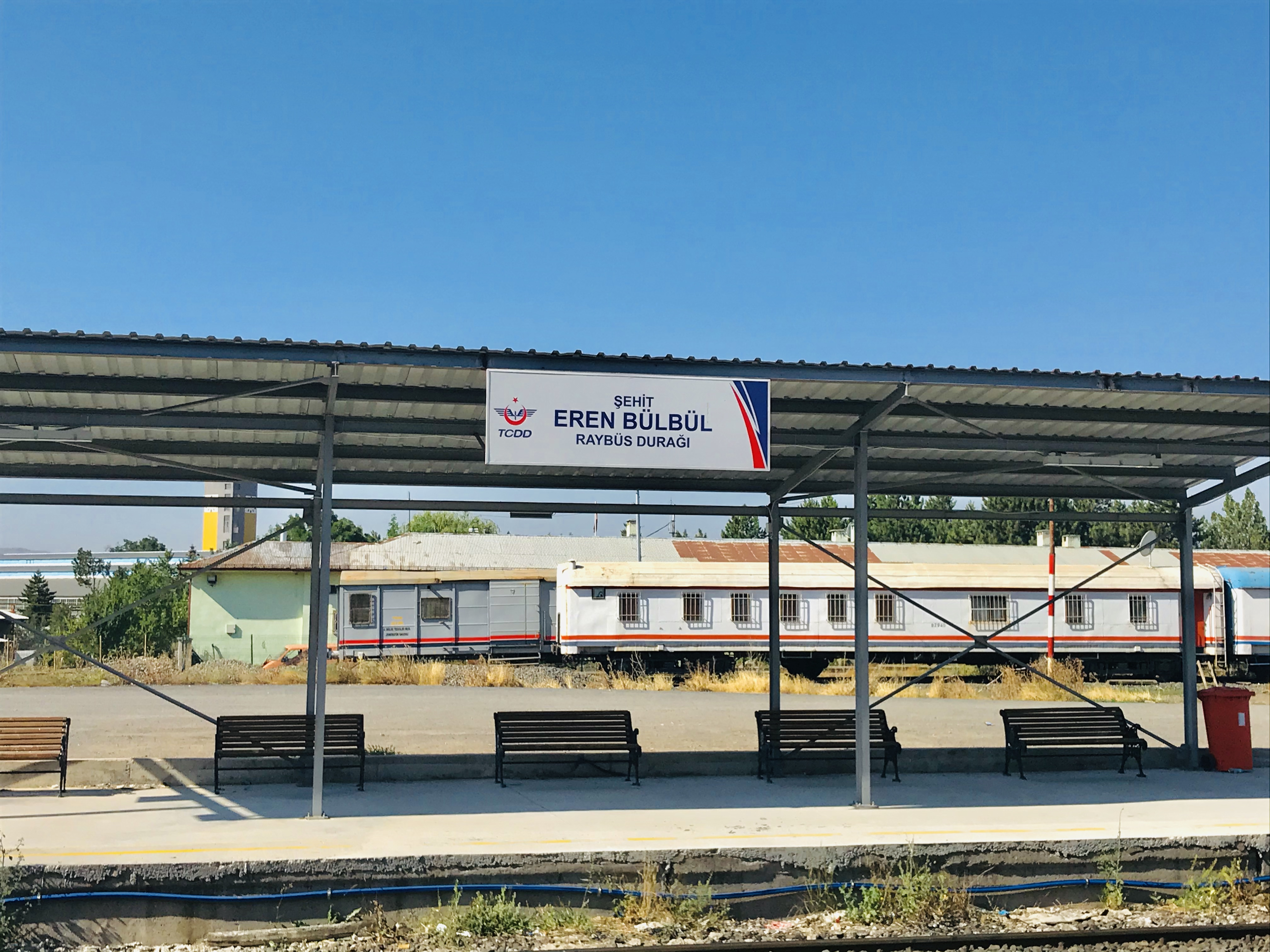
Martyr Eren Bülbül railbus station, Sivas, Turkey

On 25 June 2019, Turkish Airlines launched a survey on Twitter to name the new Boeing 787 aircraft. Among the options suggested in the survey were ancient city names such as Perga, Assos, Göbekli Tepe, and Zeugma, but Eren Bülbül's name was not included in the list. When many Twitter users initiated a campaign to put the name Eren Bülbül on the plane, Turkish Airlines responded by naming the plane after Bülbül's hometown Maçka. In August 2021 Turkish manufacturer of special purpose and military vehicles, Katmerciler, presented a new tactical vehicle, Katmerciler Eren, named after Eren Bülbül.

== See also ==
- Death of Şenay Aybüke Yalçın
