= Koyunbaba =

Turkish saint

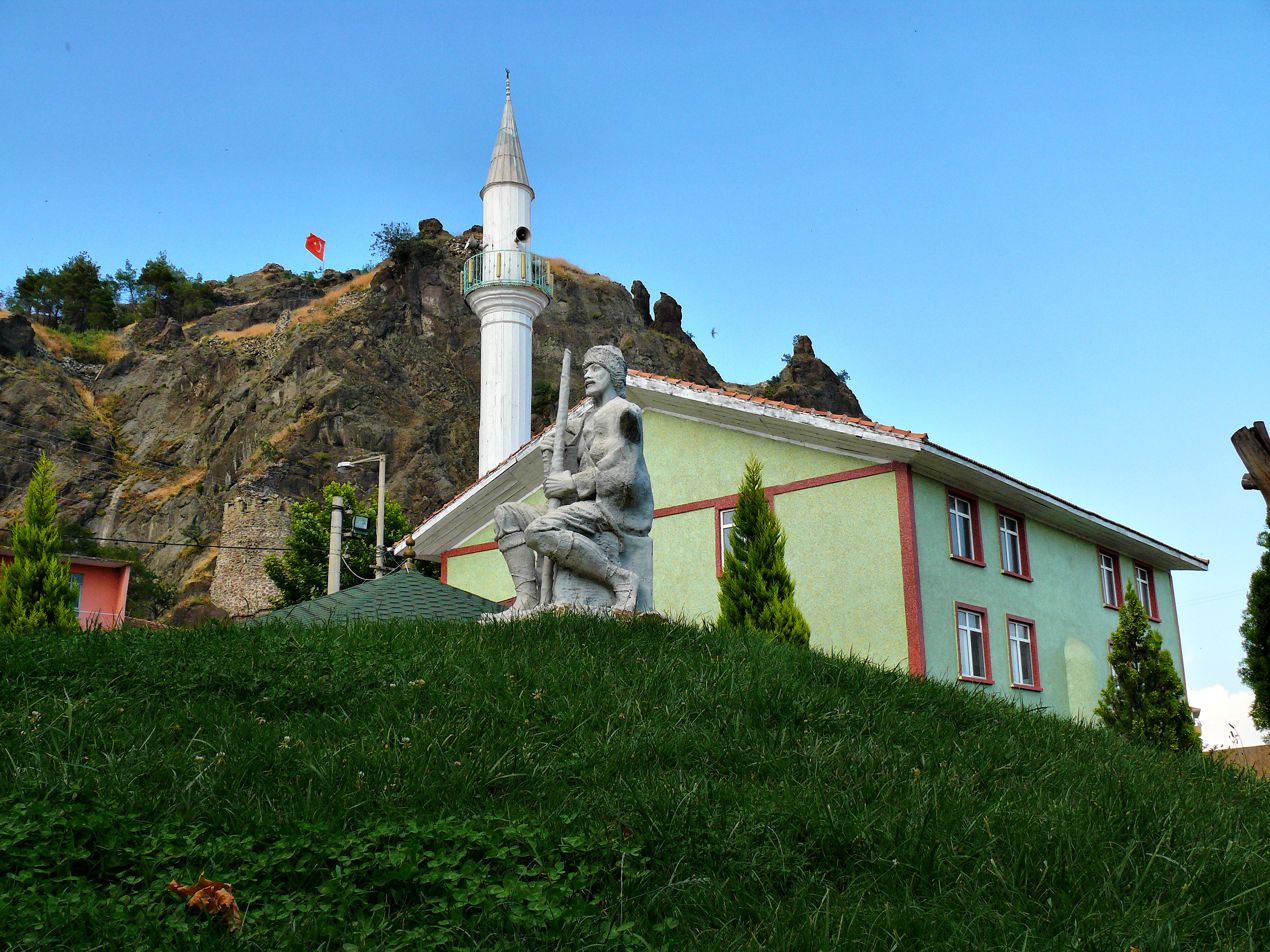
Koyunbaba statue in Osmancık, Çorum Province, Turkey.

Koyunbaba (or Seyit Ali) was a saint who lived in the city of Osmancık in Çorum Province, Turkey, in the 15th century. Koyunbaba (whose epithet means "sheep father") was a shepherd in Bursa in northwestern Turkey.

The guitar suite Koyunbaba by Carlo Domeniconi was named after this saint.

== See also ==
- Koyunbaba Bridge, a historic arch bridge in Osmancık, Çorum
