= Carlo Domeniconi =

Italian guitarist and composer

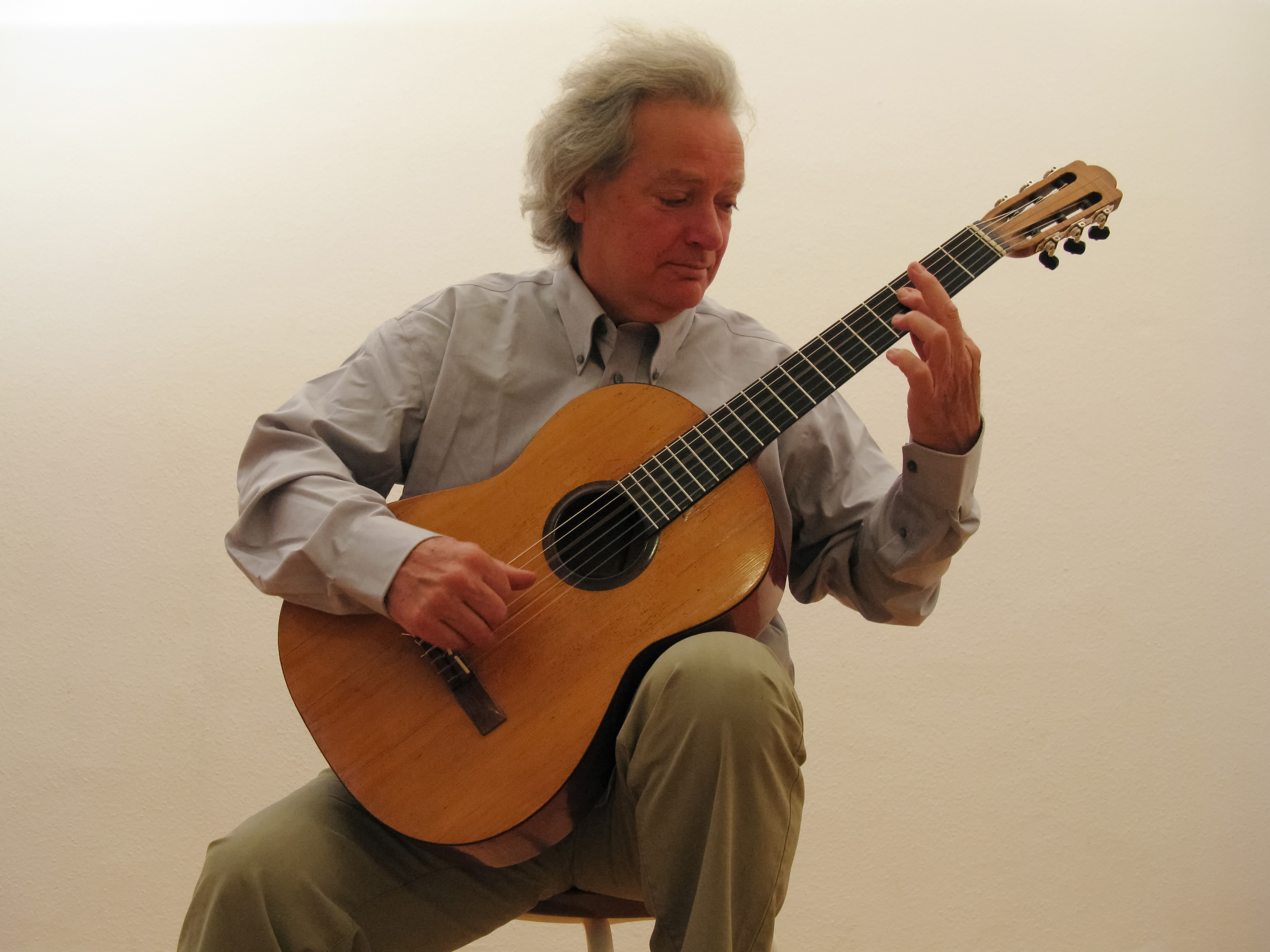
- Domeniconi with a Luigi Mozzani guitar from 1938

Background information
- Born: 20 February 1947 (age 79); Cesena, Italy
- Genres: Atonal
- Occupations: Musician; composer; professor
- Instrument: guitar
- Years active: 1960–present
- Website: Official website

Carlo Domeniconi (born 20 February 1947) is an Italian guitarist and composer. Although his compositions include a wide variety of genres and instrumentation choices, he is best known for his works for solo guitar, and particularly the Koyunbaba suite. Domeniconi's style is characterized by his adoption of multicultural influences. His works explore and borrow from a wide variety of national traditions, including Turkish, Indian, Brazilian, and many more.

== Biography ==
Domeniconi was born in Cesena, Italy. He received his first formal guitar lessons in 1960 from Carmen Lenzi Mozzani, granddaughter of the famous guitarist and luthier Luigi Mozzani. Making rapid progress, he won first prizes at the Ancona International Festival of Guitar in 1960 and 1962. After obtaining his diploma from the Rossini Conservatory in Pesaro, Domeniconi left Italy for West Berlin, where he studied composition at the Berliner Hochschule für Musik under Heinz Friedrich Hartig. Upon graduation in 1969, Domeniconi took up a teaching position in Berlin, which he held until 1992. Already in the 1960s, Domeniconi became interested in Turkish music traditions, which he studied in situ in 1977–1980, establishing and heading the first classical guitar course at the Istanbul University State Conservatory, and on many shorter trips he took to Istanbul.

A milestone in his oeuvre is the “Concerto di Berlinbul” for bağlama, guitar and chamber orchestra, composed in 1987. The world premiere took place in the Berliner Philharmonie together with bağlama virtuoso Adil Arslan.

== Works ==
The list of Domeniconi's published compositions includes more than 150 titles. Most of these works are scored either for solo guitar, or an ensemble that includes one or more guitars. One of the defining characteristics of Domeniconi's music is its exploration of various national styles, which include Turkish (Koyunbaba, Variations on an Anatolian Folk Song, Sonatina turca, Oyun), Indian (Gita, Dhvani), various South American styles (Suite Sud Americana, Vidala, Sonido), and many others.

One of the works inspired by Turkish music, the Koyunbaba suite of 1985–86, eventually became Domeniconi's most well-known work. Throughout the 1990s it was particularly frequently programmed in concerts and recorded by numerous performers. The piece is named after a Turkish saint Koyunbaba. The liner notes to a recording made by Domeniconi in 1991 for a Turkish record label state that the work is a suite pastorale, describing "the natural beauty of a little bay" overlooking the Aegean Sea, where the saint was said to live centuries ago.

Educational music has been a particularly important field for Domeniconi, as numerous works he composed for young players attest, such as Klangbilder (Sound Pictures), 24 Preludes, and Eine kleine Storchsuite.

== Selected discography ==
- Concerto di Berlinbul – Koyunbaba (1991) cover program
- Sindbad – Ein Märchen für Gitarre (kr 1001, Kreuzberg)
- To Play or Not to Play (kr 5004, Kreuzberg)
- Watermusic (Carlo Domeniconi & Silvia Ocougne) (kr 1002, Kreuzberg)
- Movement in Circles, Chamber Music 1989–1995 (kr 10019, Kreuzberg)
- El Trino del Diablo (kr 1004, Kreuzberg)
- Selected Works I (met 1001, Co-production: edition ex tempore, Berlin & HOMA dream, Japan)
- Selected Works II (met 1002, Co-production: edition ex tempore, Berlin & HOMA dream, Japan)
- Selected Works I – solo guitar works, 2005 (met 1001)
- Selected Works II – solo guitar works, 2005 (met 1002)
- Selected Works III – Music for two guitars, 2006 (met 1003)
- Selected Works IV – Chamber Music, 2009 (met 1004)
- Selected Works V – 25 years Koyunbaba, 2009 (met 1005)
- Concerto Mediterraneo (1993) op.67 (Hänssler CD 98.347, Hänssler CLASSIC)

== Publications ==
- Carlo Domeniconi – Berlinbul Concerto – Doppelkonzert für Saz, Gitarre und Orchester, op. 29 from edition ex tempore, Berlin
- Carlo Domeniconi – Suite Pittoresca – Für Bassklarinette, Gitarre und Streichorchester from edition ex tempore, Berlin

== Bibliography ==
- Cumming, Danielle. 2005. Led Zeppelin and Carlo Domeniconi: Truth Without Authenticity? D.Mus. paper (McGill University. Faculty of Music).
- Harries, Colin. 2014. "The Solo Guitar Music of Carlo Domeniconi: An Exploration of the Diverse Influences". Master's thesis, Waterford Institute of Technology.
- Summerfield, Maurice J. 2003. The Classical Guitar: Its Evolution, Players and Personalities Since 1800. Hal Leonard Corporation. ISBN 9781476851655.
- Wade, Graham. 2010. A Concise History of the Classic Guitar. Mel Bay Publications. ISBN 9781609742805.
