= Bayezid Pasha =

Grand Vizier of the Ottoman Empire from 1413 to 1421

Amasyalı Bayezid Pasha

Grand Vizier of the Ottoman Empire
- In office 1413 – July 1421
- Monarchs: Mehmed I Murad II
- Preceded by: Imamzade Halil Pasha
- Succeeded by: Çandarlı Ibrahim Pasha the Elder

Personal details
- Born: Amasya, Turkey (then the Ottoman Empire)
- Died: July 1421 Sazlıdere, Keşan, Edirne, Turkey (then the Ottoman Empire)
- Relations: Hamza Bey (Brother)
- Parent: Amasyalı Yahşi Bey (Father)

Bayezid Pasha or Beyazid Pasha (also known as Amasyalı Beyazid Pasha; died July 1421) was an Ottoman statesman who served as grand vizier of the Ottoman Empire from 1413 to 1421. He was the first Albanian and first Muslim from Balkans to become Grand Vizier of the Ottoman state.

== Biography ==
Bayezid was of Albanian origin and a war captive. The 15th-century Byzantine historian Doukas described Bayezid as a slave of Albanian origin. Modern historian Uzunçarşılı, without citing a source, wrote that he was born in Amasya as the son of Amasyalı Yahşi Bey, earning him the epithet Amasyalı, meaning "from Amasya," which implied he wasn't a convert or at least not a recent one. This means their grandfather was an Albanian convert to Islam and joined the Ottoman conquest, settling in Amasya. He was raised in the imperial palace. While Bayezid I was sultan, he served in various military positions. When Bayezid I's son, the future sultan Mehmed I (then known as Mehmed Çelebi), was a provincial governor, Bayezid Pasha served as one of his head advisers.

After the disastrous Battle of Ankara in 1402, when Tamerlane defeated the Ottoman Empire and took sultan Bayezid I prisoner, Bayezid Pasha rescued the 15-year-old Mehmed Çelebi from Tamerlane's forces and brought him to his hometown of Amasya. After the subsequent Ottoman Interregnum in 1413, when Mehmed Çelebi finally defeated his brothers' claims to the throne, Bayezid Pasha became the official grand vizier under the now-sultan Mehmed I.

Under Mehmed I, Bayezid Pasha crushed the rebellion of Sheikh Bedreddin in 1420.

After Mehmed I's death on May 26, 1421, upon Mehmed's request, Bayezid Pasha kept the sultan's death a secret for the 40 days it took his son and successor Murad II to arrive in the capital to ascend the throne. This move was in order to avoid a civil war in an empire still reeling from that of the Ottoman Interregnum.

In July 1421, only two months after Murad II's coronation, Bayezid Pasha, still grand vizier, was sent to lead an army against the rebellion of Mustafa Çelebi, Murad II's uncle. Bayezid's forces met with Mustafa in the area of the future village of Sazlıdere in Keşan, Edirne in central Thrace. In the midst of battle, Bayezid Pasha's forces deserted him and joined Mustafa Çelebi's forces, forcing him to surrender to Mustafa. Mustafa's ally Junayd of Aydın, distrustful of Bayezid, urged Mustafa to execute him, which Mustafa did promptly by beheading him. Junayd spared Bayezid's brother Hamza Bey, however, who in 1425 would be the one to avenge him by having Junayd and his family executed. Bayezid Pasha's grave is at the site in Sazlıdere.

Political offices
Preceded by Imamzade Halil Pasha	Grand Vizier of the Ottoman Empire; 1413 – July 1421	Succeeded by Çandarlı Ibrahim Pasha
