= Pimolisa =

Fortified town of ancient Paphlagonia

Coordinates: 41°00′48″N 34°42′35″E

Pimolisa (Ancient Greek: Πιμώλισα), or Pimolison, was a fortified town of ancient Paphlagonia on the Halys River, near the western border of Pontus. It had been destroyed by Strabo's time, but the district on both sides of the Halys was still called Pimolisene.

Its site is located near Osmancık, Asiatic Turkey.
