= Imamzade Halil Pasha =

Grand Vizier of the Ottoman Empire from 1406 to 1413

Osmancıklı İmamzade Halil Pasha

Grand Vizier of the Ottoman Empire
- In office 18 December 1406 – 1413
- Monarch: Mehmed I
- Preceded by: Çandarlı Ali Pasha
- Succeeded by: Bayezid Pasha

Personal details
- Born: Osmancik, Ottoman Empire

Imamzade Halil Pasha (Ottoman Turkish: امامزاده حلیل پاشا; Turkish: İmamzade Halil Paşa) was an Ottoman statesman. He was grand vizier of the Ottoman Empire from 1406 to 1413.

His son, Koca Mehmed Nizamüddin Pasha, also served as grand vizier. His title Imamzade means Son of an Imam in Persian.

Political offices
Preceded by Çandarlı Ali Pasha	Grand Vizier of the Ottoman Empire; 18 December 1406 – 1413	Succeeded by Bayezid Pasha
