= İç oğlan =

Ottoman boy servants who worked in the inner courts of the Topkapı Palace

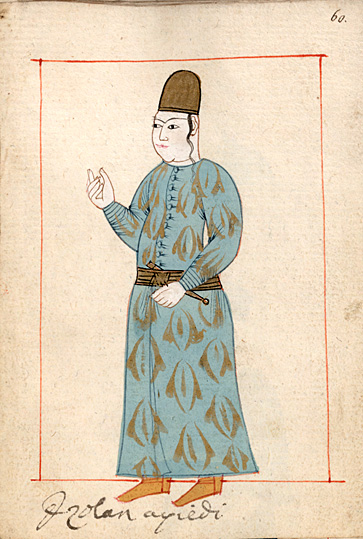
Iç oğlan from the Ralamb Costume Book, 17th century

The term iç oğlan ("Inner [Palace] Boy") refers to the boy servants or pages who were taken from Christian parents in the Balkans and converted under the devşirme system in the Ottoman Empire. These pages worked in the Enderûn (the Inner Palace), one of the three main sections of the Topkapı Palace in Istanbul. As the Inner Palace servants, they served in the private apartments of the Sultan and his family.

== Sources ==
- Ed. (1986). "Ič-Og̲h̲lani̊". The Encyclopedia of Islam, New Edition, Volume III: H–Iram. Leiden and New York: BRILL. p. 1006. ISBN 90-04-08118-6.
