= Heinz Friedrich Hartig =

German composer and harpsichordist (1907-1969)

- Born: September 10, 1907 (age 118); Kassel
- Died: September 16, 1969 (aged 62) Berlin
- Instrument: Harpsichord

Heinz Friedrich Hartig (10 September 1907 in Kassel – 16 September 1969 in Berlin) was a German composer and harpsichordist.

In 1948 he began teaching at the Berlin University of the Arts. Seven years later, he took up a professorship there. He became acquainted with Boris Blacher, a composer with whom he collaborated extensively.

As harpsichordist, Hartig made numerous recordings, mostly in the role of continuo player rather than soloist. His compositional output consists mainly of concertos, sonatas, songs, oratorios and choral works. He also gained a distinguished reputation as a pedagogue. His students included Carlo Domeniconi and Roland Pfrengle.

== Selected works ==
- Sonata for clarinet and piano, op. 7
- Concerto for violin and orchestra, op. 10
- Der Trinker und die Spiegel for baritone and choir, op. 16
- Concerto for piano and orchestra, op. 30
- Songs for baritone and orchestra, op. 40
- Variationen über einen siebentönigen Klang für Orchester op. 39
- Wohin (oratorio)
