= Koyunbaba Bridge =

Koyunbaba Köprüsü Koyunbaba Köprüsü
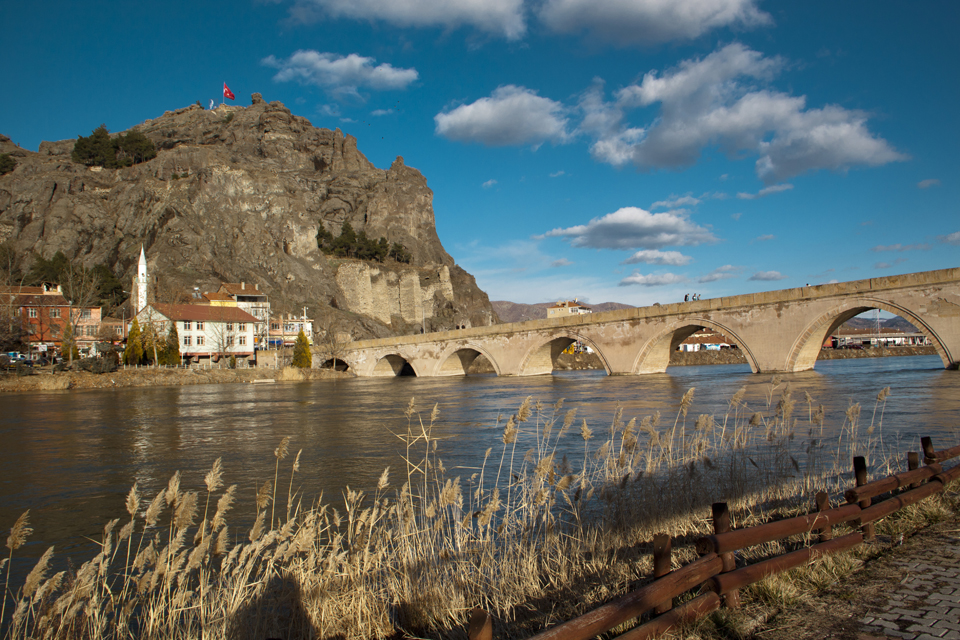
- Koyunbaba Köprüsü
- Coordinates: 40°58′13″N 34°48′02″E
- Crosses: Kızılırmak River
- Locale: Osmancık, Çorum, Turkey

Characteristics
- Total length: 250 m (820 ft)
- Width: 7.50 m (24.6 ft)
- No. of spans: 19 (15 visible)

History
- Construction start: 1484
- Construction end: 1489; 536 years ago

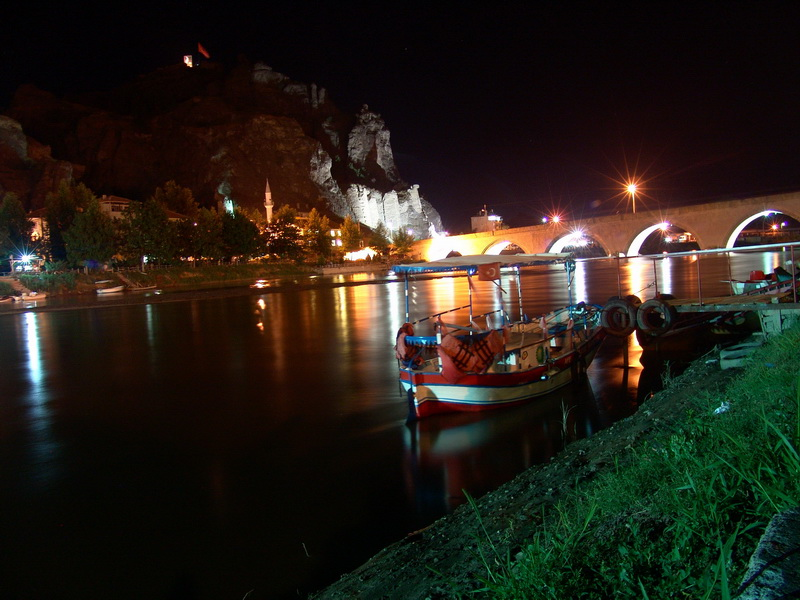
Koyunbaba Bridge by night.

Koyunbaba Bridge (Turkish: Koyunbaba Köprüsü) is a stone arch bridge crossing the Kızılırmak River in Çorum Province, Turkey. It was built between 1484 and 1489 and is the longest stone arch bridge built in Anatolia during Ottoman rule.

== History ==
Koyunbaba Bridge is located at the center of Osmancık district in Çorum Province, northern Turkey. It was built between 1484 and 1489 during the reign of Ottoman Sultan Bayezid II (r. 1481–1512). The 250 m (820 ft)-long and 7.50 m (24.6 ft)-wide bridge was constructed in ashlar. It spans the Kızılırmak River with 19 pointed arches, of which today only 15 arches are visible due to sedimentation on the river bank. It is the longest stone arch bridge built in Anatolia during the Ottoman Empire era. The bridge is named after the 15th-century local Turkish saint Koyunbaba. An inscription in Ottoman Turkish alphabet gives the beginning and completion dates of the construction in Hijri year as 889 and 894 without naming the architect.

== Restorations ==
The bridge saw many restorations. In the 1960s, the original ashlar pavement was replaced with 32 cm (13 in)-thick concrete and covered with asphalt. In the 1980s, the facades of the bridge were plastered with compounded mortar and slurry was used in the mortar joints. Over time, the mortar on the facades crumbled. The latest restoration work aiming to reinstate its original state began in July 2014, and continued until 2017. After removal of the mortar on the facades in the first instance, the bridge was closed to motor traffic and pedestrians for further restoration work in November 2015.
