= Koca Mehmed Nizamüddin Pasha =

Grand Vizier of the Ottoman Empire from 1429 to 1438

Osmancıklı / Amasyalı · Koca Mehmed Nizamüddin Pasha

Grand Vizier of the Ottoman Empire
- In office 28 August 1429 – 1438
- Monarchs: Murad II; Mehmed II
- Preceded by: Çandarlı Ibrahim Pasha the Elder
- Succeeded by: Çandarlı Halil Pasha the Younger

Personal details
- Died: 1439 Osmancık, Ottoman Empire

Osmancıkli (or Amasyali) Koca Mehmed Nizamüddin Pasha (Turkish: Osmancıklı Danişmendoğlu Koca Mehmet Nizamüddin Paşa; died 1439) was an Ottoman statesman who served as grand vizier of the Ottoman Empire from 1429 to 1438.

He settled in Osmancık after his service as grand vizier and died there in 1439. He was the son of Imamzade Halil Pasha, who also served as grand vizier.

== See also ==
- List of Ottoman grand viziers

Political offices
Preceded by Çandarlı Ibrahim Pasha the Elder	Grand Vizier of the Ottoman Empire; 28 August 1429 – 1438	Succeeded by Çandarlı Halil Pasha the Younger
