= Buçuktepe rebellion =

Revolt in the Ottoman Empire

Buçuktepe rebellion was a revolt by the Janissaries who opposed Murat II's (1421-1451) enthronement of his young son Mehmet II. Even though the Janissaries could not dethrone Murat II, they still made the government accept a half increase in their salaries. In addition, this revolt was the first Janissary revolt in Ottoman history. After that day, the name of the hill where the rebellion took place in Edirne is "Buçuktepe".
