= Çandarlı Ibrahim Pasha the Younger =

Grand Vizier of the Ottoman Empire from 1498 to 1499

Çandarlı Ibrahim Pasha

Grand Vizier of the Ottoman Empire
- In office 1498–1499
- Monarch: Bayezid II
- Preceded by: Hersekzade Ahmed Pasha
- Succeeded by: Mesih Pasha

Personal details
- Born: 1429
- Died: 1499 (aged 69–70)

Çandarlı Ibrahim Pasha (1429–1499), called the Younger, was an Ottoman statesman who served as grand vizier from 1498 to 1499.

He was the scion of the Çandarlı family, which provided a series of grand viziers during the first centuries of the Ottoman Empire. His father, Çandarlı Halil Pasha, had also served as Grand Vizier from 1443 until his execution in 1453. Ibrahim was appointed qadi (judge) of Adrianople and survived his father's disgrace, and was named qadi 'asker (judge of the army), a very prestigious post, in 1465, before assuming the duties of tutor (lala) to the future Sultan Bayezid II.

He became second visier when Bayezid II ascended to the throne in 1481. When Hersekzade Ahmet Pasha was dismissed from his position, he was appointed as Grand Vizier in 1498. Next year he joined the Venetian campaign with Sultan Bayezid. He died in the military camp near Naupaktos.

He had two sons named Hüseyin and İsa who served to Selim I and Suleyman I in different positions. He had charitable works such as mosques, baths and madrasahs built in cities such as Istanbul, Bursa, Aksaray and Kastamonu.

He was buried at Iznik.

Political offices
Preceded by Hersekzade Ahmed Pasha	Grand Vizier of the Ottoman Empire; 1498–1499	Succeeded by Mesih Pasha
