= Çandarlızade Ali Pasha =

Grand Vizier of the Ottoman Empire from 1387 to 1406

Grand Vizier of the Ottoman Empire
- In office 22 January 1387 – 18 December 1406
- Monarchs: Murad I Bayezid I Süleyman Çelebi
- Preceded by: Çandarlı Halil Pasha the Elder
- Succeeded by: Imamzade Halil Pasha

Personal details
- Born: c. After 1330
- Died: 18 December 1406 Ankara, Ottoman Empire (now Ankara, Turkey)
- Relations: Çandarlı Kara Halil Hayreddin Pasha (father)
- Dynasty: Çandarlı

Çandarlızade Ali Pasha (died 18 December 1406) was the grand vizier of the Ottoman Empire from 1387 until 1406, first under sultan Murad I, then sultan Bayezid I and, during the Ottoman Interregnum, Süleyman Çelebi.

== Life and career ==
As a member of the prominent Çandarlı family, Ali was the son of Grand Vizier Çandarlı Kara Halil Hayreddin Pasha. Like his father, he advanced from kadı to kadıasker, before becoming Grand Vizier, likely immediately after the death of his father in 1387. He served as Grand Vizier to Sultans Murad I (r. 1362–1389), Bayezid I (r. 1389–1402), and, during the Ottoman Interregnum, of Süleyman Çelebi (r. 1402–1411), until his death in December 1406. As Grand Vizier, he was not only chief minister and head of the administration, but also chief army commander.

=== Under Murad I and Bayezid I ===
In 1387/8, he accompanied Murad I in his campaign against the Karamanids of central Anatolia. The Karamanid ruler, Aleddin (r. 1361–1398), offered peace, but Çandarlızade Ali advised the Sultan to press on, until securing Aleddin's complete submission. In the next year, 1388/9, he led operations against the Bulgarian tsar Ivan Shisman (r. 1371–1395). His army captured several fortresses, including Provadia, Pirot, and Shumen, and the Bulgarian capital of Veliko Tarnovo, forcing Shishman to capitulate to the Ottomans. Çandarlızade Ali then led his troops to join Sultan Murad at the crucial Battle of Kosovo on 20 June 1389 against the Serbian ruler Lazar (r. 1373–1389). The Ottomans won, but the Sultan was killed, and was succeeded by his son, Bayezid I.

Çandarlızade Ali accompanied Bayezid in his campaigns in Greece and Bosnia, and fought in the Battle of Nicopolis in 1396, which resulted in the defeat of the Crusader army under the King of Hungary, Sigismund. In 1391 Bayezid began an on-and-off blockade and intermittent siege of the Byzantine capital, Constantinople, that lasted until 1402. Ali was a proponent of maintaining diplomatic avenues open, and in 1391 or 1396 he brokered an agreement that temporarily lifted the siege in exchange for the establishment of a mosque and a Turkish quarter in the city, with its own kazı.

=== Under Süleyman Çelebi ===
On 26 July 1402, in the Battle of Ankara, Bayezid I was defeated and captured by Timur. This momentous event overturned the balance of power in the region, as the Ottoman domains in Anatolia were divided by Timur, who restored many of the Anatolian beyliks previously absorbed by Bayezid. Timur did not interfere with the Balkans, however, where the Ottoman conquest was also far advanced. Ali helped save Bayezid's oldest son, Süleyman Çelebi, from capture, and escorted him to the Ottoman capital Bursa, and then to the Ottomans' European capital, Adrianople.

He continued serving Süleyman Çelebi as Grand Vizier during the early stages of the Ottoman Interregnum civil war, and was likely responsible for the Treaty of Gallipoli with the Christian powers of the region in early 1403, which preserved most of the Ottoman conquests in the Balkans. During Süleyman Çelebi's campaign into Anatolia in 1403–1404, against his younger brother Mehmed Çelebi (the future Mehmed I, r. 1413–1421), Ali is said to have been responsible for the peaceful surrender of Ankara, by forging letters from Mehmed to the city's garrison. He died in Ankara in December 1406. He was buried in the Yeşil Mosque at Iznik, which his father had begun and which he completed.

His loss deprived Süleyman of a capable minister, helping to bring about his downfall in 1410.

== Legacy ==
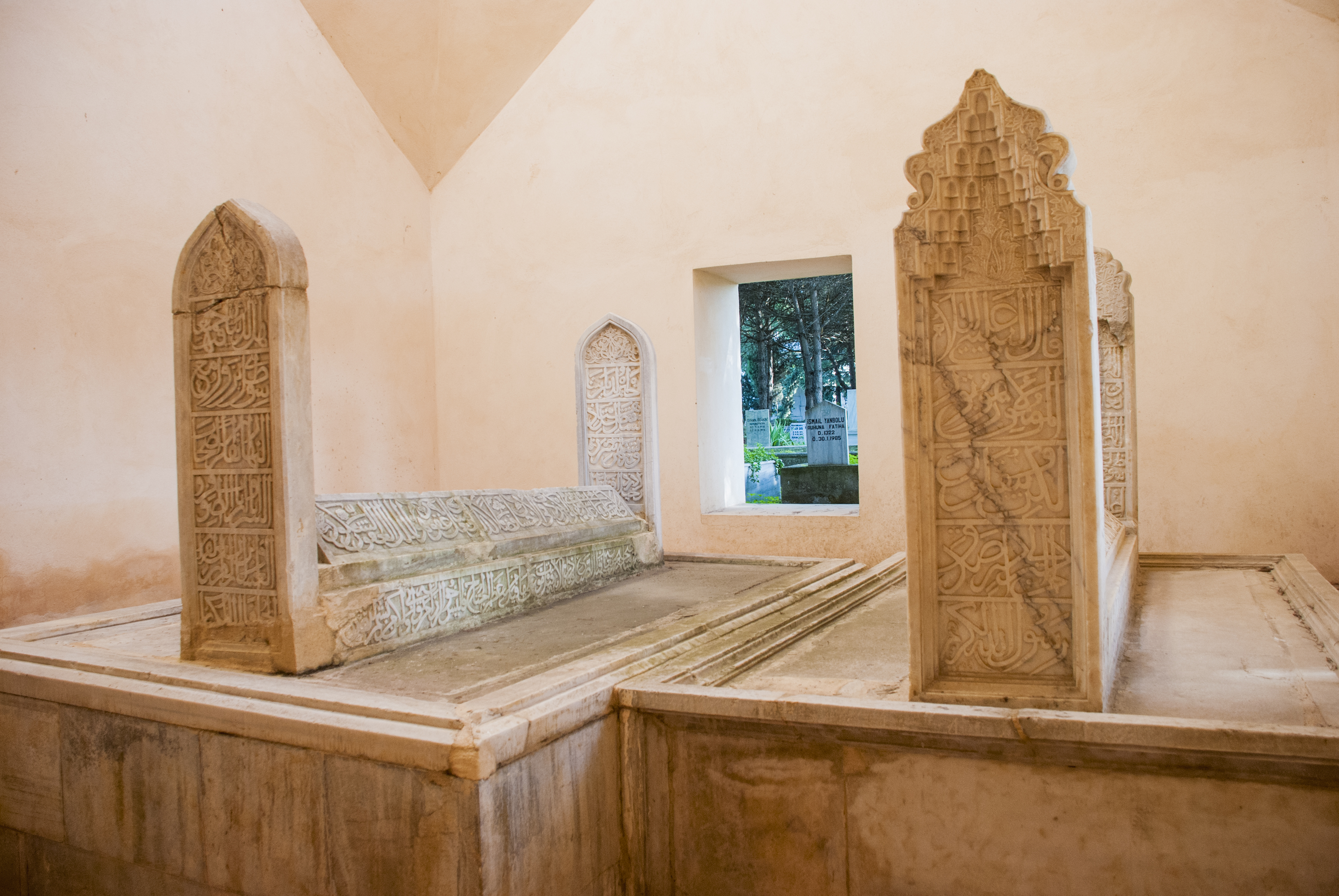
Tombs of Çandarlızade Ali Pasha (left), and his father Çandarlı Kara Halil Hayreddin Pasha (right), Yeşil Mosque of Iznik

As grand vizier, Çandarlızade Ali contributed to the gradual development of the Ottoman state's administration. Notably he codified the responsibilities of the kadıs and arranged for them to charge fees for their services instead of receiving a fixed salary. He founded the corps of palace pages (iç oğlan), which would provide the military and administrative elite of the empire, and enhanced the prestige of the viziers.

Ottoman chroniclers present a very negative picture of Çandarlızade Ali, accusing him of being a drunkard and a paedophile, and of inducing both Bayezid and Süleyman to follow his debauched lifestyle. Likewise the chroniclers claim that he was unpopular both among the administration and the common people. These accusations should be treated with caution, however, as they were circulated by his rivals and enemies, particularly the partisans of Mehmed I, who emerged victorious in the civil war.

Apart from the Yeşil Mosque in Iznik, Ali founded a small mosque (mesjid) and a tekke in Bursa, where a quarter bore his name.

== Sources ==
- Atçıl, Abdurrahman (2017). "Çandarlızade Ali Paşa". In Fleet, Kate; Krämer, Gudrun; Matringe, Denis; Nawas, John; Rowson, Everett (eds.). Encyclopaedia of Islam (3rd ed.). Brill Online. doi:10.1163/1573-3912_ei3_COM_24854. ISSN 1873-9830.
- Kastritsis, Dimitris (2007). The Sons of Bayezid: Empire Building and Representation in the Ottoman Civil War of 1402-13. BRILL. ISBN 978-90-04-15836-8.
- Mantran, R. (1960). "Alī Pas̲h̲a Čāndārli̊̊-Zāde". In Gibb, H. A. R.; Kramers, J. H.; Lévi-Provençal, E.; Schacht, J.; Lewis, B. & Pellat, Ch. (eds.). The Encyclopaedia of Islam, Second Edition. Volume I: A–B. Leiden: E. J. Brill. p. 394. doi:10.1163/1573-3912_islam_SIM_0529. OCLC 495469456.

Political offices
Preceded by Çandarlı Kara Halil Hayreddin Pasha	Grand Vizier of the Ottoman Empire; 22 January 1387 – 18 December 1406	Succeeded by Imamzade Halil Pasha
