= Osmancık =

- Municipality
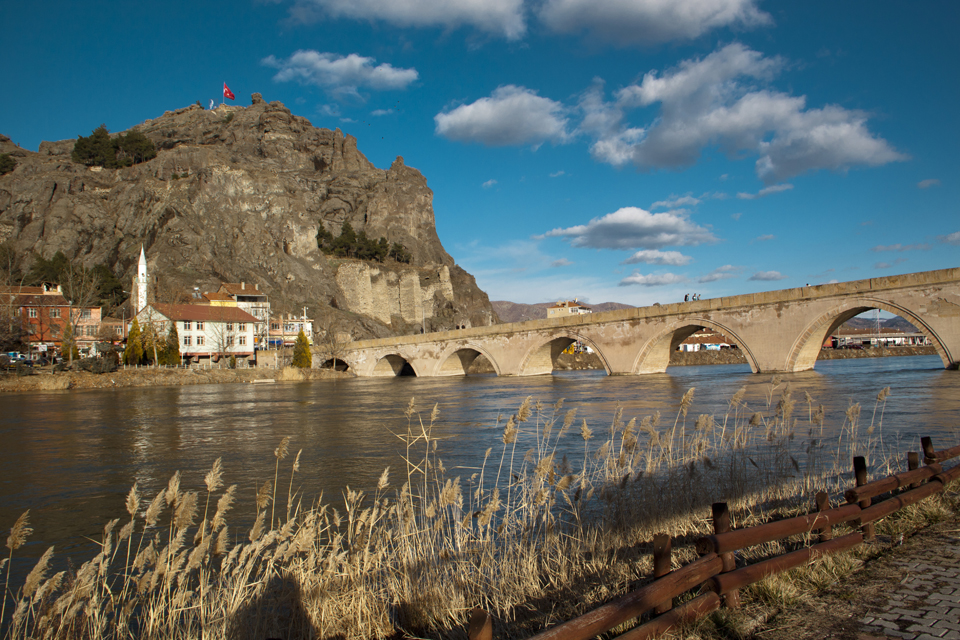
- Koyunbaba Bridge

- Coat of arms

- Location within Turkey
- Coordinates: 40°58′N 34°48′E
- Country: Turkey
- Province: Çorum
- District: Osmancık

Government
  - Mayor: Ahmet Gelgör (MHP)
- Population (2022): 30,537
- Time zone: UTC+3 (TRT)
- Postal code: 19500
- Area code: 0364
- Climate: Cfa
- Website: www.osmancik.bel.tr

Osmancık is a town in Çorum Province in the Black Sea region of Turkey, located 59 km north of the city of Çorum. It is the seat of Osmancık District. Its population is 30,537 (2022).

== Geography ==
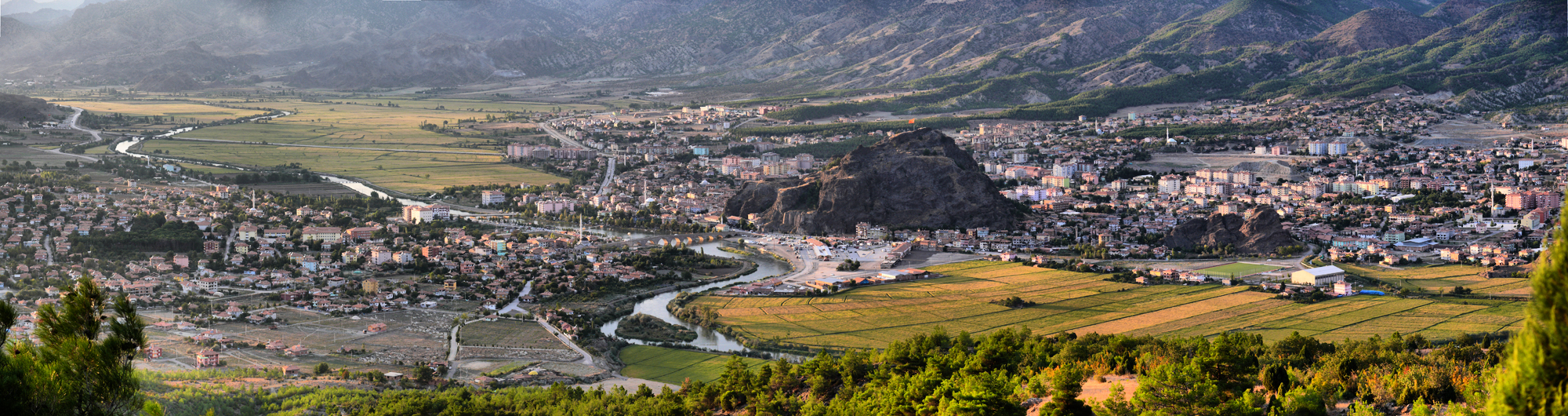
Panorama of Osmancık

Located on an important crossing of the Kızılırmak River on the ancient Silk Road to the Orient, Osmancık has long had strategic value and is still today a popular stopping place on the road from Istanbul to the Black Sea city of Samsun and further east.

Today, Osmancık is known for its rice production, being especially suitable for a new strain of rice developed specifically for the region by the Turkish Ministry of Agriculture and named "Osmancık-97."

The North Anatolian Fault zone runs through the valley, making Osmancık highly vulnerable to earthquakes.

The town consists of 18 quarters: Gemici, Güney, Kızılırmak, Ulucami, Yazı, Yeni, Yeşilçatma, Şenyurt, Gürleyik, Temençe, Karapınar, Çiftlikler, Cumhuriyet, Çay, Esentepe, Eymir, Hıdırlık, and Koyunbaba.

=== Climate ===
Climate data for Osmancık (1991–2020)
| Month | Jan | Feb | Mar | Apr | May | Jun | Jul | Aug | Sep | Oct | Nov | Dec | Year |
|---|---|---|---|---|---|---|---|---|---|---|---|---|---|
| Mean daily maximum °C (°F) | 6.0 (42.8) | 9.4 (48.9) | 14.8 (58.6) | 20.4 (68.7) | 25.3 (77.5) | 29.1 (84.4) | 32.5 (90.5) | 32.9 (91.2) | 28.7 (83.7) | 22.3 (72.1) | 13.7 (56.7) | 7.5 (45.5) | 20.3 (68.5) |
| Daily mean °C (°F) | 1.8 (35.2) | 3.9 (39.0) | 8.3 (46.9) | 13.4 (56.1) | 18.2 (64.8) | 22.1 (71.8) | 25.2 (77.4) | 25.3 (77.5) | 20.9 (69.6) | 15.1 (59.2) | 7.5 (45.5) | 3.4 (38.1) | 13.8 (56.8) |
| Mean daily minimum °C (°F) | −1.4 (29.5) | −0.4 (31.3) | 2.9 (37.2) | 7.3 (45.1) | 12.0 (53.6) | 15.8 (60.4) | 18.3 (64.9) | 18.3 (64.9) | 14.0 (57.2) | 9.3 (48.7) | 2.8 (37.0) | 0.3 (32.5) | 8.3 (46.9) |
| Average precipitation mm (inches) | 35.28 (1.39) | 27.48 (1.08) | 40.95 (1.61) | 42.17 (1.66) | 52.62 (2.07) | 65.95 (2.60) | 17.28 (0.68) | 23.07 (0.91) | 23.98 (0.94) | 28.27 (1.11) | 27.83 (1.10) | 43.71 (1.72) | 428.59 (16.87) |
| Average precipitation days (≥ 1.0 mm) | 6.6 | 5.2 | 6.9 | 7.1 | 8.4 | 7.2 | 2.9 | 3.4 | 3.1 | 4.8 | 4.3 | 6.6 | 66.5 |
| Average relative humidity (%) | 78.2 | 71.5 | 64.2 | 60.0 | 60.4 | 58.9 | 52.3 | 52.8 | 57.4 | 65.8 | 74.0 | 79.5 | 64.4 |
Source: NOAA

== History ==
The area was settled by the Kayı clan of the Oghuz Turks as they migrated westward into Anatolia from their heartland of Central Asia. Osmancık was one of the important destinations in the Ottoman period. Because of several earthquakes, the city could not preserve its ancient architecture. In the last century, there have been four or five major earthquakes. Being on the path of the Kızılırmak River made the city an important settlement point since early history. Osmancık was known as Pimolisa during the Roman and Byzantine eras. From 1867 until 1922, Osmancık was part of the Angora vilayet.

== Population ==
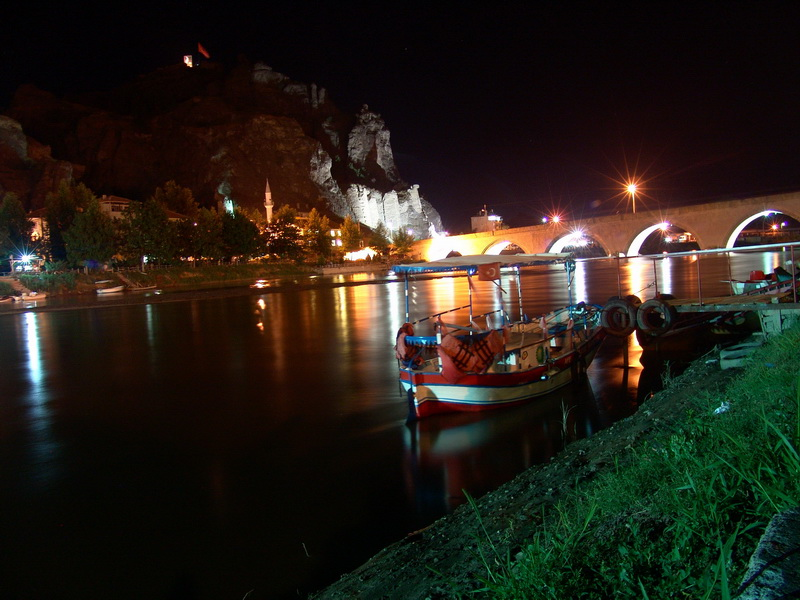
Kızılırmak River and Koyunbaba Bridge

| Year | Population |
|---|---|
| 2022 | 30,537 |
| 2008 | 24,678 |
| 2000 | 30,423 |
| 1990 | 21,347 |
| 1831 | 4,349 |

== Notable natives ==
- Osmancıklı İmamzade Halil Pasha, 15th-century Ottoman statesman, in the court of Mehmed I
- Osmancıklı (Amasyalı) Koca Mehmed Nizamüddin Pasha, 15th-century Ottoman statesman
- Pakçemüezzin Baltacı Mehmet Pasha, 18th-century Ottoman statesman, rumored to have been a lover of Catherine I of Russia
- General Ahmet Çörekçi, Former Head Commander of Turkish Air Force
- Gürkan Coşkun a.k.a. "Komet" - Famous Turkish artist
- Bilal Kısa, Turkish former football player, played for Galatasaray SK and Fenerbahçe SK

== Places of interest ==
- In the village of Ardıç, to the west of Osmancık, there is a road cut by the Ancient Romans through a rock named Çalınkaya
- Koyunbaba Bridge over the Kızılırmak, built in 1489
- The Seljuk Turk castle of Kandiber, in the town center
- İmaret Camii, an historical mosque, built by Selijuk Turks in the Güney Quarter
- The Ottoman period tomb of Sufi mystic Koyunbaba
- The Trojan war hero Achilles was said to have been finally buried on the hill of Adatepe
