= Devshirme =

Ottoman child levy and enslavement

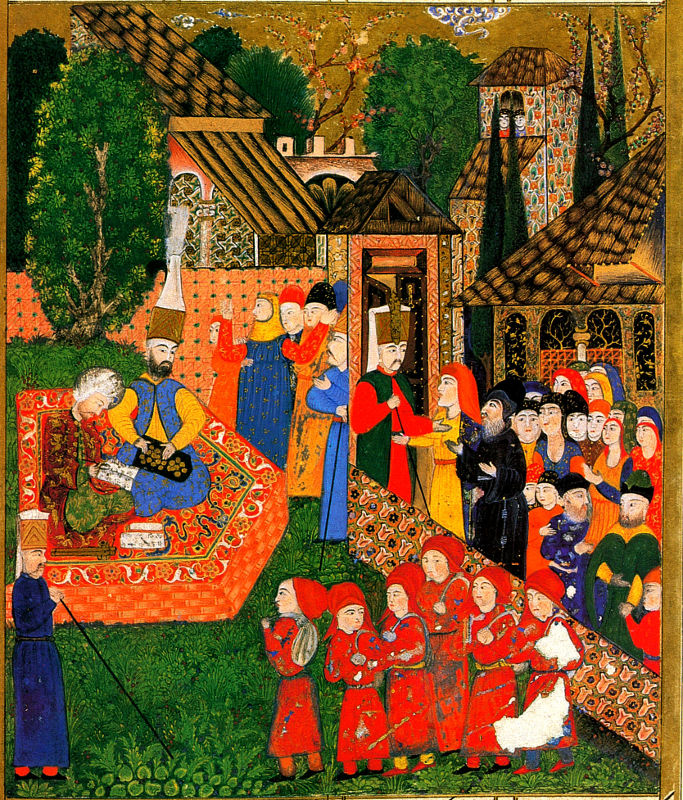
Illustration of an Ottoman official and his assistant registering Christian boys for the devshirme. The official takes a tax to cover the price of the boys' new red clothes and the cost of transport from their home, while the assistant records their village, district and province, parentage, date of birth and physical appearance. Ottoman miniature painting, 1558.

Devshirme (Ottoman Turkish: دوشیرمه, romanized: devşirme, lit. 'collecting', (Note: occasionally "devishirme") usually translated as "child levy" (Note: Known as 'collection of children' or 'child-gathering' in: Medieval Greek: παιδομάζωμα, romanized: Paedomazoma; Armenian: Մանկահավաք, romanized: Mankahavak′.) or "blood tax" (Note: Known as 'blood tax' in: Romanian: tribut de sânge; Serbo-Croatian: Danak u krvi, Данак у крви, Macedonian: Данок во крв, romanized: Danok vo krv, Bulgarian: Кръвен данък, romanized: Kraven Danak.)) was the Ottoman practice of forcibly recruiting soldiers and bureaucrats from among the children of their Balkan Christian subjects and raising them in the religion of Islam. Those coming from the Balkans came primarily from noble Balkan families and rayah classes. It is first mentioned in written records in 1438, but probably started earlier. It created a faction of soldiers and officials loyal to the Sultan. It counterbalanced the Turkish nobility, who sometimes opposed the Sultan.

The system produced a considerable number of grand viziers from the 15th century to the 17th century. This was the second most powerful position in the Ottoman Empire, after the sultan. Initially, the grand viziers were exclusively of Turk origin, but after there were troubles between Sultan Mehmed II and the Turkish grand vizier Çandarlı Halil Pasha the Younger, who was the first grand vizier to be executed, there was a rise of slave administrators (devshirme). They were much easier for the sultans to control, compared to free administrators of Turkish aristocratic extraction. The devshirme also produced many of the Ottoman Empire's provincial governors, military commanders, and divans from the 15th to the 17th century. Sometimes, the devshirme recruits were castrated and became eunuchs. Although often destined for the harem, many eunuchs of devshirme origin went on to hold important positions in the military and the government, such as grand viziers Hadım Ali Pasha, Sinan Borovinić, and Hadım Hasan Pasha.

Ottoman officials would take male Christian children, aged 7 to 20, from Eastern, Southern and Southeastern Europe, and relocate them to Istanbul, where they were converted, circumcised, assimilated and trained to serve in the Janissary infantry corps or for palace duties. Devshirme were rarely sold, though some could end up as slaves in private households. The fact that they were taken forcibly from their parents made the devshirme system resented by locals. However, revolts were rare, with the exception of a revolt against the devshirme in Albania in 1565. Ordered to cut all ties with their families, some managed to use their positions to help their families. Muslims were not allowed into the system (with some exceptions), but some Muslim families smuggled their sons in anyway. According to Speros Vryonis, "The Ottomans took advantage of the general Christian fear of losing their children and used offers of devshirme exemption in negotiations for surrender of Christian lands. Such exemptions were included in the surrender terms granted to Jannina, Galata, Morea, Chios, etc. Christians who engaged in specialized activities important to the Ottoman state were exempted from the devshirme on their children by way of recognition of the importance of their labors for the empire. Exemption from this tribute was considered a privilege and not a penalty."

Many scholars consider the practice of devshirme as violating Islamic law. David Nicolle writes that enslavement of Christian boys violates the dhimmi protections guaranteed in Islam, but Halil İnalcık argues that the devshirme were not slaves once converted to Islam. (Note: Historian James L. Gelvin writes that "[t]his process of recruitment (devshirme) remains a sore spot in Balkan historiography: while many contemporary Turks prefer to look at the process of recruitment as purely voluntary, the word kidnapping is not unknown in histories written by Greek scholars.") The boys were given a formal education, and trained in science, warfare and bureaucratic administration, and became advisers to the sultan, elite infantry, generals in the army, admirals in the navy, and bureaucrats working on finance in the Ottoman Empire. They were separated according to ability and could rise in rank based on merit. The most talented, the ichoghlani (Turkish iç oğlanı) were trained for the highest positions in the empire. Others joined the military, including the famed janissaries.

The practice began to die out as Ottoman soldiers preferred recruiting their own sons into the army, rather than sons from Christian families. In 1594, Muslims were officially allowed to take the positions held by the devshirme and the system of recruiting Christians effectively stopped by 1648. An attempt to re-institute it in 1703 was resisted by its Ottoman members, who coveted the military and civilian posts. Finally, in the early days of Ahmet III's reign, the practice of devshirme was abolished.

== History ==
The devshirme (from the Turkish word meaning 'to collect') came up out of the kul system of slavery that developed in the early centuries of the Ottoman Empire, and which reached this final development during the reign of Sultan Bayazit I. The kul were mostly prisoners from war, hostages or slaves that were purchased by the state. The Ottoman Empire, beginning with Murad I, felt a need to "counteract the power of (Turkic) nobles by developing Christian vassal soldiers and converted kapıkulu as his personal troops, independent of the regular army." This elite force, which served the Ottoman Sultan directly, was called Kapıkulu Ocağı (The Hearth of the Porte Servants). (Note: Kapıkulu has meaning of more a 'paid servant' rather than a slave, as word's meaning shifted over years. The word 'kul' has there meanings in Turkic: 'slave', 'servant' and 'male [biological] son'; thus, in this context, they were treated as and called 'servants' through the word kul, with köle being the actual term used to describe literal slaves (mostly domestic house slaves).) They were divided into two main groups: cavalry and infantry. (Note: More classifications, such as the artillery and cannon corps, miners and moat diggers and even a separate cannon-wagon corps were introduced later on, but the number of people in these groups were relatively small, and they incorporated Christian elements.) The cavalry was commonly known as the Kapikulu Sipahi (The Cavalry of the Servants of the Porte) and the infantry as the janissaries (Yeni Çeri, meaning "the New Corps"). The devshirme conscripts were set apart from the janissaries in that they were not a cavalry group, rather exclusively infantry.

At first, the soldiers serving in these corps were selected from the slaves captured during war. However, a new system commonly known as devshirme was soon adopted. In this system, children of the rural Christian populations of the Balkans were conscripted before adolescence and were brought up as Muslims. Upon reaching adolescence, these children were enrolled in one of the four imperial institutions: the palace, the scribes, the Muslim clergy, and the military. Those enrolled in the military would become either part of the Janissary corps (1363), or part of another corps. The most promising were sent to the palace school (Enderûn Mektebi), where they were destined for a career within the palace itself and could attain the highest office of state, Grand Vizier, the Sultan's powerful chief minister and military deputy. In the beginning of the Ottoman Empire, this office was held only by Turks. However, after there were problems between sultan Mehmed II and the Turkish Çandarlı Halil Pasha the Younger, who became the first grand vizier to be executed, there was a rise of slave administrators devshirme. They were much easier to control for the sultans, as compared to free administrators of Turkish noble origin. They were also less subject to influence from court factions. From the very beginning, the Turcoman were a danger that undermined the Sultan's creation of a strong state. Thus, the establishment of this class counterbalanced the Turkish nobility, who sometimes opposed the Sultan.

An early Greek source mentioning devshirme (paidomazoma) is a speech by Archbishop Isidore Glabas, made on 28 February 1395, titled: "On the abduction of children according to sultan's order and on the Future Judgment". The speech includes references to the violent Islamization of children and their hard training in the use of dogs and falcons.

A reference to devshirme is made in a poem composed c. 1550 in Greek by Ioannes Axayiolis, who appeals to Emperor Charles V of Germany to liberate the Christians from the Turks. The text is found in the Codex Vaticanus Graecus of 1624. In another account, the Roman Catholic bishop of Chios in 1646 writes to the director of the Catholic Greek Gymnasion of Rome asking the latter to accept Paulos Omeros, a 12-year-old boy from Chios, to save him from the devshirme.

The recruitment of children took place every three to four years and at times even annually, according to the needs of the Sultan. The largest loss of children coincided with the peak of Ottoman expansion in the fifteenth and sixteenth centuries under the rule of Selim I and Suleiman the Magnificent.

== The life of the devshirme ==
According to historian William Gervase Clarence-Smith, Christian children were taken by Ottoman officials, every four to seven years, their age ranging from 7 to 20. Those younger than 8 were called şirhor (nursling) and beççe (child). One for every forty households was chosen, they had to be unmarried and once taken were ordered to cut all ties with their family.

Christian parents undeniably resented the forced recruitment of their children, as a result they would beg and often seek to buy their children out of the levy. The Balkan peasantry tried to evade the tribute collectors, with many attempting to substitute their children in Bosnia. Many sources (including Paolo Giovio) mention different ways to avoid the devshirme such as: marrying the boys at the age of 12, mutilating them or have both father and son convert to Islam. Conversion to Islam was used in Bosnia and Herzegovina to escape the system. In Albania and Epirus the practice led to a Christian revolt where the inhabitants killed the recruiting officials in the year 1565. In Naousa, after killing the recruiting officials the parents fled to the mountains but were later caught and executed in 1705.

Any parent who refused to have their child taken as a slave was put to death, and children who attempted to resist being taken from their families as janissaries by fleeing would lead to the Turks arresting and then torturing their parents to death (Many children who attempted to flee on their own returned after hearing of their parents' torture). Such was the case of an Athenian boy who returned from hiding to save his father's life but chose to die himself rather than abandon his faith and convert to Islam. A firman in 1601 gave strict orders to Ottoman officials to kill any parent that resisted:

To enforce the command of the known and holy fetva [fatwa] of Seyhul [Shaikh]-Islam. In accordance with this whenever some one of the infidel parents or some other should oppose the giving up of his son for the Janissaries, he is immediately hanged from his door-sill, his blood being deemed unworthy.

Sources claim that it was not rare for the older youth to attempt to preserve their faith and some recollection of their homeland and their families. For instance, Stephan Gerlach writes:

They gather together and one tells another of his native land and of what he heard in church or learned in school there, and they agree among themselves that Muhammad is no prophet and that the Turkish religion is false. If there is one among them who has some little book or can teach them in some other manner something of God's world, they hear him as diligently as if he were their preacher.

Greek scholar Janus Lascaris visited Constantinople in 1491 and met many janissaries who not only remembered their former religion and their native land but also favored their former coreligionists. The renegade Hersek, the sultan's relative by marriage, told him that he regretted having left the religion of his fathers and that he prayed at night before the cross which he kept carefully concealed.

In his memoir, Konstantin Mihailović (1430–1501), a Serbian who was abducted in his youth and marched away by the Turks, saw nothing "prestigious" or "lucrative" about becoming a janissary. "We always thought about killing the Turks and running away by ourselves among the mountains," he writes, "but our youth did not permit us to do that." Once when he and a group of other boys broke free and escaped, "the whole region pursued us, and having caught and bound us, they beat us and tortured us and dragged us behind horses."

After Ottoman Sultan Mehmed II took eight Christian youths into his service, they made a pact to assassinate him by night, saying "If we kill this Turkish dog, then all of Christendom will be freed [from Ottoman tyranny]; but if we are caught, then we will become martyrs before God with the others." When their plot was exposed, and Mehmed inquired what caused them to "dare attempt this," they responded, "None other than our great sorrow for our fathers and dear friends." He had the children slowly tortured over the course of a year before beheading them.

On the other hand, since the devshirme could reach powerful positions, some Muslim or Christian families tried to have the recruiters take their sons so that they could achieve professional advancement. Christian boys were forced to convert to Islam.

In Epirus, a traditional folk song expressed this resentment by cursing the Sultan for the kidnapping of boys:

Be damned, O Emperor, be thrice damned
For the evil you have done and the evil you do.
You catch and shackle the old and the archpriests
In order to take the children as Janissaries.
Their parents weep and their sisters and brothers too And I cry until it pains me;
As long as I live I shall cry,
For last year it was my son and this year my brother.

— Anonymous song protesting the collecting of young boys to be made slaves of the Ottoman Empire,

The Tübingen manuscript written by Andre Argyros and John Tholoites and given to Martin Crusius in 1585 shows what the Christian parents thought of the Janissaries:

You understand, then, my lords and Christian gentlemen, what sorrow the Greeks bear, the fathers and the mothers who are separated from their children at the prime of life. Think ye of the heartrending sorrow! How many mothers scratch out their cheeks! How many fathers beat their breast with stones! What grief these Christians experience on account of their children who are separated from them while alive, and how many mothers say, "It would have been better to see them dead and buried in our church, rather than to have them taken alive in order to become Turks and abjure our faith. Better that you had died!"

Stephen Gerlach gives the case of a Greek Mother from Panormus in Anatolia who had two boys and begged God every day to take them away because she would soon be forced to give up one of them. The distress expressed here was motivated not only by religious considerations, but also by the low opinion the Byzantines held for Turks (whom they called barbarians).

In desperation the parents would appeal to the Pope and western powers for help. A petition of the Albanians of Himarë in the year 1581, addressed to the Pope reads: "Holiest father, if you could convince him and save us and the children of Greece, that are taken every day and are turned into Turks, if you could only do this, God may bless you. Amen".

In 1456 Greeks living on the western coast of Anatolia appealed to the Knights Hospitalers of Rhodes for help.

We, who do dwell in Turkey ... inform your lordship that we are heavily vexed by the Turk, and that they take away our children and make Muslims of them ... For this reason we beseech your lordship to take council that the most holy pope might send his ships to take us and our wives and children away from here, for we are suffering greatly from the Turk.

The children were taken from their families and transported to Istanbul. Upon their arrival, they were forcibly converted to Islam, examined and made to serve the empire. The system produced infantry corps soldiers as well as civilian administrators and high-ranked military officials. Their village, district and province, parentage, date of birth, and physical appearance was recorded. Albertus Bobovius wrote in 1686 that diseases were common among the devshirme and that strict discipline was enforced. Although the influence of Turkic nobility continued in the Ottoman court until Mehmet II (see Çandarlı Halil), the Ottoman ruling class slowly came to be dominated by the devshirme, creating a separate social class. This class of rulers was chosen from the brightest of devshirme and handpicked to serve in the palace institution, known as the Enderûn. They had to accompany the Sultan on campaigns, but exceptional service would be rewarded by assignments outside the palace. Those chosen for the scribe institution, known as kalemiye, were also granted prestigious positions. At the religious institution, İlmiye, all orthodox Muslim clergy of the Ottoman Empire were educated and sent to provinces or served in the capital.

The children were subjected to a draconian training system: "They make them drudge day and night, and they give them no bed to sleep on and very little food." They were allowed to "speak to each other only when it is urgently necessary" and were made to "pray together without fail at four prescribed times every day." As "for any little offense, they beat them cruelly with sticks, rarely hitting them less than a hundred times, and often as much as a thousand. After punishments the boys have to come to them and kiss their clothing and thank them for the cudgelings they have received. You can see, then, that moral degradation and humiliation are part of the training system," writes 16th century Italian diplomat Giovan Francesco Morosini (cardinal). They were "degraded to the level of animals" and showed a "dog-like devotion to the sultan", writes Vasiliki Papouli.

Tavernier noted in 1678 that the janissaries looked more like a religious order than a military corps. The members of the organization were not banned from marriage, as Tavernier further noted, but it was very uncommon for them. He went on to write that their numbers had increased to a hundred thousand but only due to a degeneration of regulations, with many of them in fact being "fake" janissaries, posing as such for tax exemptions and other social privileges. He noted that the actual number of janissaries was in fact much lower. Shaw writes that their number was 30,000 under Suleiman the Magnificent. By the 1650s, the number of janissaries had increased to 50,000, but by this time, the devshirme had largely been abandoned as a method of recruitment.

According to Cleveland, the devshirme system offered "limitless opportunities to the young men who became a part of it." Basilike Papoulia wrote that "the devishirme was the 'forcible removal', in the form of a tribute, of children of the Christian subjects from their ethnic, religious and cultural environment and their transportation into the Turkish-Islamic environment with the aim of employing them in the service of the Palace, the army, and the state, whereby they were on the one hand to serve the Sultan as slaves and freedmen and on the other to form the ruling class of the State." Accordingly, Papoulia agrees with Hamilton Alexander Rosskeen Gibb and Harold Bowen, authors of Islamic Society and the West, that the devshirme was a penalization imposed on the Balkan peoples since their ancestors had resisted the Ottoman invasion. Vladimir Minorsky states, "The most striking manifestation of this fact is the unprecedented system of devshirme, i.e. the periodic conscription of 'tribute boys', by which the children of Christians were wrung from their families, churches, and communities to be molded into Ottoman praetorians owing their allegiance to the Sultan and the official faith of Islam." This system as explained by Çandarlı Kara Halil Hayreddin Pasha, founder of the Janissaries: "The conquered are slaves of the conquerors, to whom their goods, their women, and their children belong as lawful possession".

== Status under Islamic law ==
According to scholars, the practice of devshirme was a clear violation of sharia or Islamic law. David Nicolle writes that since the boys were "effectively enslaved" under the devshirme system, this was a violation of the dhimmi protections guaranteed under Islamic law to People of the Book. The practice of devshirme also involved forced conversions to Islam. This is disputed by Turkish historian Halil İnalcık, who argues that the devshirme were not slaves once converted to Islam.

Some scholars point out that the early Ottoman Empire did not care about the details of sharia and thus did not see any problems with devshirme. During this time, the Ottomans believed that the Qanun, the law enacted by the Sultan, superseded sharia even though the latter was treated with respect. The devshirme was just one example in which the Sultan's wishes superseded the sharia (another example is that Ottoman sultans set maximum interest rates even though sharia totally prohibits interest). James L. Gelvin explains that Ottoman jurists were able to get around that injunction with an extraordinarily creative legal manoeuvre by arguing that although Islamic tradition forbade the enslavement of Christians, Balkan Christians were different because they had converted to Christianity after the advent of Islam. (This was true of most rural Christians in the Balkans, but not the Greeks.) William Gervase Clarence-Smith points out that the reasoning is not accepted in the Hanafi school of law, which the Ottoman Empire claimed to have practiced.

Contemporary Ottoman chroniclers had mixed opinions on the practice. An Ottoman historian of the 1500s, Mustafa Âlî, admitted that devshirme violated sharia but was allowed only out of necessity. Others argued the Muslim conqueror had the right to one fifth of war booty and could thus take the Christian boys; however, Islamic law allows no such booty from communities that had submitted peacefully to conquest and certainly not from their descendants.

== Ethnicity of the devshirme and exemptions ==
The devshirme were collected once every four or five years from rural provinces in Eastern Europe, Southeastern Europe and Anatolia. They were mainly collected from Christian subjects, with a few exceptions. However, some Muslim families managed to smuggle their sons in anyway. The devshirme levy was not applied to the major cities of the empire, and children of local craftsmen in rural towns were also exempt, as it was considered that conscripting them would harm the economy.

According to Bernard Lewis, the janissaries were mainly recruited from the Slavic and Albanian populations of the Balkans. According to the Encyclopædia Britannica and the Encyclopaedia of Islam, in the early days of the empire, all Christians were enrolled indiscriminately. Later, those from Greece, Albania, Bosnia and Bulgaria were preferred. What is certain is that devshirme were primarily recruited from Christians living in the Balkans. Since Muslim Bosnians were the only Muslim ethnic group allowed to be recruited, an armed guard was required to lead the Bosnians on their way to Istanbul to avoid any Turkish boys from being smuggled into their ranks.

Jews were exempt from this service. Armenians are also believed to have been exempt from the levy by many scholars, (Note: Shaw states that the reason for the exemption may have been the recognition of both people as a separate nation (none of the Balkan ethnic groups were recognized as such) or that both Jews and Armenians lived mostly in the major cities anyway.) (Note: Albertus Bobovius, who was enslaved by Crimean Tatars and sold into the palace in the 17th century, reported that both Armenians and Jews were exempt from the devshirme levy. He wrote that the reason for the exemption of Armenians was religious in that Armenian Gregorian Church was considered the closest to Christ's (and therefore Muhammed's) teachings.) although a 1997 publication that examined Armenian colophons from the 15th to the 17th centuries and foreign travelers of the time concluded that Armenians were not exempt. Boys who were orphans or were their family's only son were exempt.

Well-known examples of Ottomans who had been recruited as devshirme include Skanderbeg, Sinan Pasha and Sokollu Mehmed Pasha.

=== Unifying factor ===
The diversity of the devshirme also served as a unifying factor for the Ottoman Empire. Greeks, Armenians, Albanians, and other ethnicities would see that the Sultan was Turkish, but his viziers were Albanian, Bulgarian, Greek and other ethnicities. The ethnic diversity in high-level and powerful positions of the Ottoman Empire helped to unite the diverse groups under its jurisdiction. They also prevented a hereditary aristocracy from forming but held sway over the Sultan themselves and practically formed their own aristocracy.

== Devshirme in the Ottoman Palace School ==
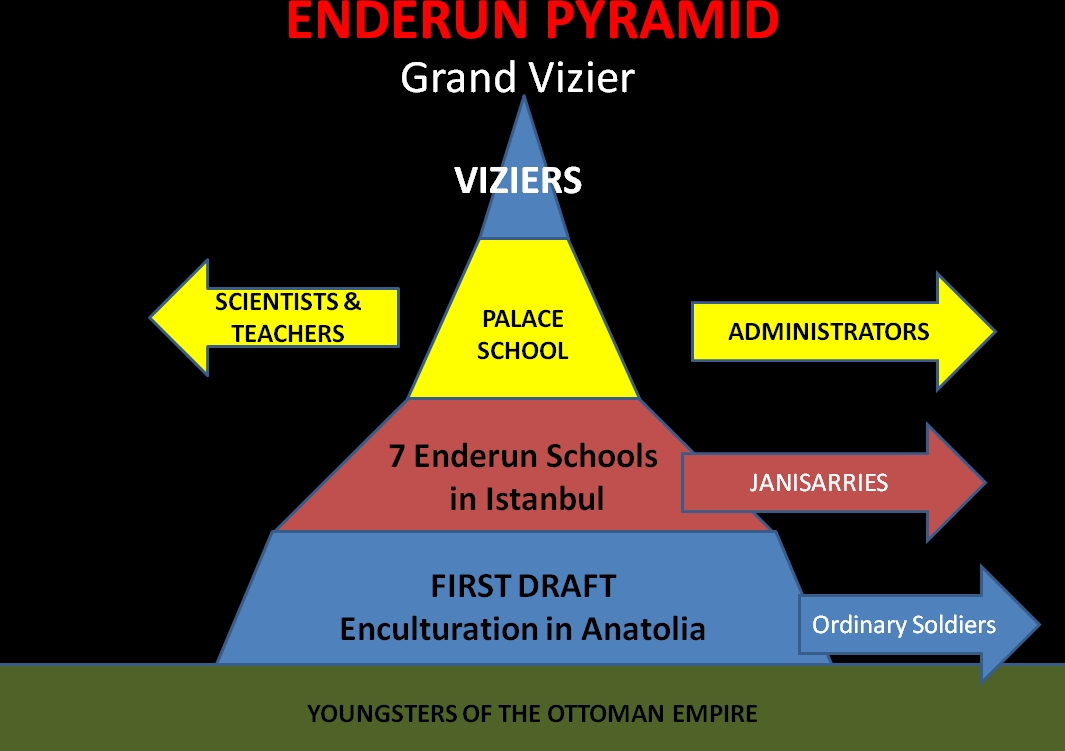
Enderûn pyramid

The primary objective of the Palace School was to train the ablest children for leadership positions, either as military leaders or as high administrators to serve the Devlet. Although there are many resemblances between Enderûn and other palace schools of the previous civilizations, such as those of the Abbasids, the Seljuks or the contemporary European palace schools, Enderûn was unique with respect to the background of the student body and its meritocratic system. In the strict draft phase, students were taken forcefully from the Christian population of the Empire and were converted to Islam. Jews and Roma were exempted from devshirme and so were all Muslims.

Those entrusted to find those children were scouts, who were specially-trained agents, throughout the Balkans. Scouts were recruiting youngsters according to their talent and ability with school subjects, in addition to their personality, character and physical perfection. The Enderûn candidates were not supposed to be orphans or the only child in their family to ensure that the candidates had strong family values. They also had to not have already learned to speak Turkish or a craft or trade. The ideal age of a recruit was between 10 and 20 years of age. Mehmed Refik Beg mentioned that a youth with a bodily defect, no matter how slight, was never admitted into palace service, since Turks believed that a strong soul and a good mind could be found only in a perfect body.

The selected children were dressed in red so that they could not easily escape on their way to Constantinople. The cost of the devshirme service and their clothes were paid by their villages or communities. The boys were gathered into cohorts of a hundred or more to walk to Constantinople, where they were circumcised and divided between the palace schools and the military training. Anyone not chosen for the palace spent years being toughened by hard labor on farms in Anatolia until they were old enough for the military.

Children not selected for the palace but who fit the general guidelines were placed with select Muslim families, mainly in Anatolia, to complete the enculturation process. They would attend schools for six to seven years to complete their training and qualify as military officers.

== Eunuchs ==
White eunuchs were sometimes recruited from among the devshirme. Unlike the black eunuchs, who were usually castrated in their place of origin, the devshirme were castrated at the palace. The palace eunuchs who supervised them often came from the same background as the devshirme (the Balkans). A considerable number of eunuchs of devshirme origin went on to hold important positions in the government and the military, and many of them became grand vizier, like Hadım Ali Pasha, Sinan Borovinić, Hadım Hasan Pasha, Hadim Mesih Pasha and Hadım Mehmed Pasha. Others, like Sofu Hadım Ali Pasha, Hadım Şehabeddin, Hadım Yakup Pasha of Bosnia, Hadım Ali Pasha of Buda, Hadım Suleiman Pasha and his namesake Hadım Suleiman Pasha, became prominent admirals and generals.

== Decline ==
According to the historian Cemal Kafadar, one of the main reasons for the decline of the devshirme system was that the size of the janissary corps had to be expanded to compensate for the decline in the importance of the sipahi cavalry forces, which itself was a result of changes in early modern warfare such as the introduction of firearms and increased importance of infantry. Indeed, the janissary corps would soon become the empire's largest single military corps. As a result, by the late 16th century, the devshirme system had become increasingly abandoned for less rigid recruitment methods, which allowed Muslims to enter directly into the janissary corps.

In 1632, the janissaries attempted an unsuccessful coup against Murad IV, who then imposed a loyalty oath on them. In 1638 or 1648, the devshirme-based recruiting system of the janissary corps formally came to an end. In an order sent in multiple copies to authorities throughout the European provinces in 1666, a devshirme recruitment target of between 300 and 320 was set for an area covering the whole of the central and western Balkans. On the accession of sultan Suleiman II in 1687, only 130 janissary inductees were graduated to the janissary ranks. The system was finally abolished in the early part of Ahmet III's reign (1703–1730).

After Napoleon invaded Egypt in 1798, there was a reform movement in Sultan Selim III's regime to reduce the numbers of the askeri class, who were the first class citizens or military class (also called janissaries). Selim was taken prisoner and murdered by the janissaries. The successor to the sultan, Mahmud II, was patient but remembered the results of the uprising in 1807. In 1826, he created the basis of a new modern army, the Asakir-i Mansure-i Muhammediye, which caused a revolt among the janissaries. The authorities kept the janissaries in their barracks and slaughtered thousands of them. That development entered the Ottoman history annals as the Auspicious Incident.

== See also ==
- Ottoman slavery in Central and Eastern Europe
- Mamluk
- Ghilman
- Black Guard
- 1942 wealth tax in Turkey
- The Twenty Classes
