= List of people from İzmir =

This is a list of famous people from İzmir, Turkey.

- Rita Abatzi (1914–1969) – Greek rebetiko singer
- Kayahan Açar (1949–2015), singer, composer and lyricist
- Sezen Aksu – (born 1954), Turkish singer–songwriter, musician, record producer; born in Sarayköy, Denizli and raised in central İzmir
- Ekrem Akurgal – (1911–2002), Turkish archaeologist born in Tulkarem, explorer of Old Smyrna, Pitane, Phocaea and Erythrai
- Furkan Aldemir – Turkish basketball player
- Bahadır Alkım (1915–1981), archaeologist
- George K. Anderson – U.S. Air Force general
- Necati Ateş – Turkish soccer player
- Alexander Balas – ruler of the Greek Seleucid kingdom in 150–146 BC
- Édouard Balladur – (born 1929), former French Prime Minister
- Halil Berktay – (born 1947), Turkish historian
- Haluk Bilginer (born 1954), theater and film actor
- Can Bonomo – Turkish singer of Sephardic Jewish descent; represented Turkey in the Eurovision Song Contest 2012
- Mahir Çağrı – Turkish Internet phenomenon
- Olcay Çakır – Turkish basketball player
- Demetrios Capetanakis (1912–1944) – Greek poet, essayist and critic
- Anton Christoforidis (1918–1985) – Greek light heavyweight boxer
- Salvator Cicurel (1893–1975) – Egyptian Olympic fencer and Jewish community leader
- Hüsamettin Cindoruk – (born 1933), Turkish politician, former party leader and Speaker of the Parliament
- Mehmet Culum – Turkish novelist born in Çeşme who worked in İzmir as an IT specialist
- Necati Cumalı – Turkish novelist born in Florina, raised in nearby Urla
- Meltem Cumbul – (born 1969), actress
- Cybele (1888–1978), Greek actress
- Anestis Delias (1912–1941), Greek bouzouki player, rebetiko composer and singer
- Michel Elefteriades – Greek-Lebanese composer, producer, politician, and Emperor of Nowheristan
- Stéphan Elmas (1862–1937)- Armenian composer and pianist
- Nehir Erdoğan – (born 1980), actress
- Gül Gölge – (born 1981), TV show host, model and actress
- Homer – Greek epic poet
- Attilâ İlhan – Turkish poet, novelist, essayist, journalist, and reviewer
- İsmet İnönü – (1884–1973), second President of Turkey
- Irenaeus (2nd–3rd century) – theologian, bishop of Lugdunum
- Sir Alec Issigonis – (1906–1988), Greek-British car designer whose most famous work is the Mini
- Manolis Kalomiris (1883–1962) – Greek composer
- Selâhattin Kantar – Turkish archaeologist who pioneered Smyrna excavations
- Semih Kaplanoğlu (born 1963), film director, screenwriter and filmproducer
- Semih Kaya – Turkish soccer player
- Erkut Kızılırmak (born 1969), author
- Vedat Kokona – Albanian writer and translator
- Adamantios Korais (1748–1833) – Greek humanist scholar
- Çağla Kubat – (born 1978), Turkish fashion model
- Alex Manoogian – Armenian-American industrialist; philanthropist; founder and CEO of MASCO Corporation
- Darío Moreno – Turkish-Jewish singer who made a career in France
- James Justinian Morier (1780–1849) – British diplomat, traveler and writer
- Magali Noël (1931–2015) – French actress and singer
- Metin Oktay – Turkish soccer player
- John Olcay (1940-2014) – international financier
- Aristotle Onassis (1906–1975) – Greek tycoon
- Alpay Özalan – Turkish soccer player
- Hüsnü Özyeğin (born 1944), banker
- Leonidas Paraskevopoulos (1860–1936) – Greek military man and politician
- Ambrosios Pleianthidis, (1872–1922), metropolitan bishop
- Polycarp – overseer of a Christian congregation
- Giacomo Pylarini – gave the first smallpox inoculation outside of Turkey
- Ahmed Adnan Saygun – Turkish composer, musician and writer
- Giorgos Seferis (1900–1971) – Greek poet; Nobel laureate; born in nearby Urla
- Quintus Smyrnaeus – Greek epic poet
- Yavuz Tatış – (born 1947), private collector
- Yıldız Tilbe – (born 1966), musician and pop singer
- Tryfon Tzanetis (1918–2001) – Greek footballer and coach
- Bilge Umar – Turkish jurist and writer
- Latife Uşşaki (1898–1976) – wife of Mustafa Kemal Atatürk
- Birsel Vardarlı – Turkish basketball player
- Sabbatai Zevi – (1626–1676), self-proclaimed messiah and founder of the community of Sabbateans
- Bengisu Avcı – Turkish swimmer
