= Tatís =

Tatís is a Spanish surname. Notable people with the surname include:

- Fernando Tatís (born 1975), Dominican baseball manager and former player
- Fernando Tatís Jr. (born 1999), Dominican baseball player
- Ramón Tatís (born 1973), Dominican baseball pitcher

== See also ==
- Tatış, surname
