= FFTW =

FFTW may refer to:

- Fastest Fourier Transform in the West, a free software library
- Fischer Francis Trees & Watts, an asset management firm
