= Eugene Rotberg =

American lawyer (1930–2025)

Gene Rotberg
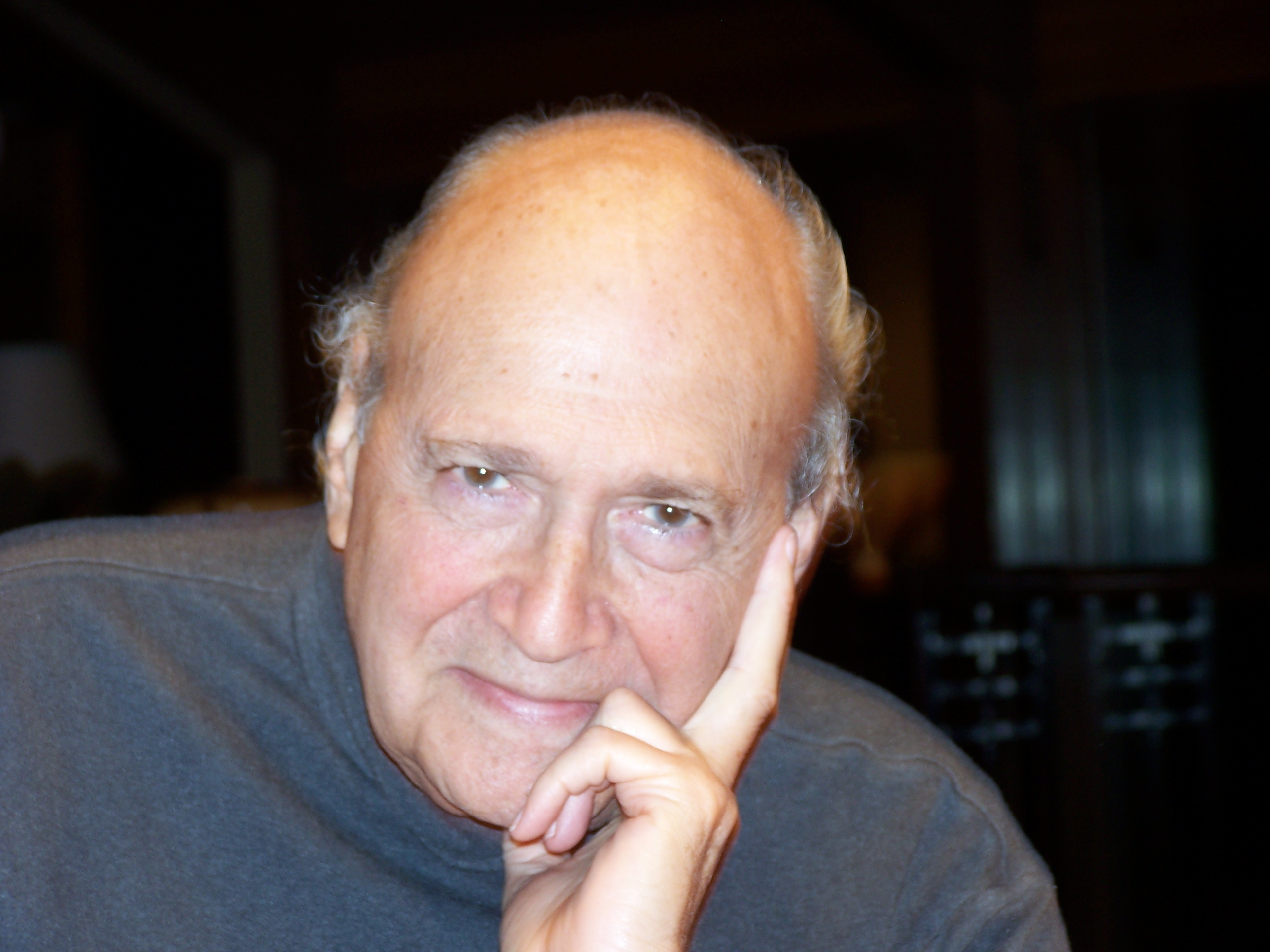
- Born: January 19, 1930; Philadelphia, Pennsylvania, U.S.
- Died: October 6, 2025 (aged 95)
- Education: Temple University (1947–1951); University of Pennsylvania Law School (1951–1954)
- Spouse: Iris Comens (m. 1954; died 2025)
- Children: 2
- Website: www.generotberg.com

Eugene Harvey Rotberg, (January 19, 1930 – October 6, 2025) was an American lawyer and international investment banker. He was known for his expertise in financial risk management, interest and exchange rates, financial market regulation, and the role of international development institutions.

Rotberg served as vice president and treasurer of the World Bank from 1968 to 1987, where he was responsible for the institution’s overall funding strategy and investment operations.

== Early career: the Securities and Exchange Commission ==
The son of Blanche and Irving Rotberg, Eugene Rotberg was born in Philadelphia Pennsylvania on January 19, 1930. After receiving his law degree from the University of Pennsylvania in 1954 and subsequent service in the U.S. Army, Gene Rotberg joined the U.S. Securities and Exchange Commission (SEC) (1957–1968) as attorney advisor. He later became associate director for trading and markets and chief counsel for the Office of Policy Research. At the SEC, he was the principal author of the congressionally mandated “Special Study of the Securities Markets” in the early 1960s with respect to the operations of the over-the-counter market and the structure of the securities markets generally. In the late 1960s, he conducted public hearings focused on the activities of the major stock exchanges, its members, and investment banking and brokerage firms—particularly with respect to the antitrust implications of their activities and agreements. For almost 200 years, the stock exchanges and their members had fixed minimum commissions for transactions on the stock exchanges, which had to be paid by the public (nonmembers).

The Institutional Investor magazine described his work at the SEC as follows: “In the mid-1960s, he spearheaded the SEC's push to crack open the New York Stock Exchange's (fixed) commission rate schedule. It was Rotberg, more than anyone else, who set in motion the forces that would culminate in the complete unfixing of commissions on ‘May Day, May 1, 1975,’ and the dawning of a new competitive era on Wall Street.”

“At the SEC, Gene had the task of leading the drive to abolish fixed commission rates and caused an uproar on Wall Street the way he grilled the brokerage firms in his career.”

== The World Bank ==
In 1968 he was asked by Robert McNamara, the recently appointed president of the World Bank, to serve as its vice president and treasurer. John Gutfreund, CEO of Salomon Brothers, later wrote, “It was one of McNamara's blessings when he got Gene Rotberg.”

At the World Bank, Rotberg was responsible for borrowing in the capital markets throughout the world to finance the World Bank lending program to developing countries. He was also responsible for the management and investment of over $20 billion liquid assets in 20 different currencies.

During his tenure at the World Bank, Rotberg was credited with opening up new capital markets throughout the world, establishing new ways of borrowing, developing worldwide capital markets, and creating innovative financial products in a score of different currencies. Many of these techniques and products were used in later years by both industrialized and developing countries to facilitate raising funds outside of their own borders for infrastructure, trade, and overall economic development. This permitted “globalization” of the world's financial system, in which savings from one country were borrowed in the capital markets to facilitate economic growth in other countries. During his tenure, he was credited with having borrowed $100 billion. (see also www.generotberg.com/testimonials.html) Ben Weberman in Forbes magazine wrote, “In the financial markets around the world, Rotberg is held in awe.”

The most innovative product was the “swap” first done by the World Bank in a transaction facilitated by Salomon Brothers with IBM in 1981. The swap in its original form permitted a borrower of one currency to shift its obligation into another currency or to permit a borrowing at floating interest rates to shift to a fixed-rate obligation or vice versa. The swap thereby permitted the liquefying of balance sheets so issuers were able to shift their original obligations through exchanging cash flows with a counter-party. Later, the swap was used in a wide variety of financial products. It is used today as both a risk-reducing and risk-taking product. The swap market has developed into the largest securities market in the world, accounting for over $500 trillion in transactions. It revolutionized financial management for governments and the private sector in the management of their resources. In describing the product, Financial Weekly wrote that it is “one of the most ingenious deals I have ever seen. It is a stroke of genius and I am thunderstruck that anybody could have such an inspired thought” (see also Institutional Investor).

Another of Rotberg's main responsibilities at the World Bank was to develop support for World Bank bonds through speeches, articles, and seminars that emphasized the financial and political strengths of the World Bank to investors, think tanks, and financial institutions throughout the world. At the time, there was great reluctance on the part of institutional investors to invest in World Bank bonds because (1) it was considered too risky to lend to an organization that lent to countries that had uncertain creditworthiness; (2) many countries to whom the World Bank lent often were politically unstable or corrupt; and (3) many countries exported goods in direct competition with the United States. Rotberg was successful in overcoming those attitudes, and as a result the World Bank was able to finance its expanded lending program. During his 19-year tenure, World Bank borrowing increased from $500 million to $10 billion a year.

In World Bank and Beyond, Panickaveetil described Rotberg as a “financial genius, . . . [with] a formidable reputation in financial markets. Rotberg's presence alone—larger than life as it turned out—was worth a billion dollars or more for the organization.”

== Later life and death ==
Rotberg lectured extensively at academic institutions such as The University of Pennsylvania Law School, The Wharton School, Duke University, Columbia University School of International and Public Affairs, Harvard Business School, Yale University School of Management, Macalester College, and The George Washington University over a period of 50 years. For many years, he was an adjunct professor at The George Washington University Law School, where he taught securities regulation. He was a frequent guest of the PBS TV program, "Debates, Debates," which focused on controversial domestic and international issues. He wrote and spoke extensively on matters dealing with the World Bank, poverty, trade, risk-taking, the securities markets, geopolitics, and the likely effects of globalization on both industrialized and less developed countries (see list and text of speeches at http://www.generotberg.com/speeches.html).

After leaving the World Bank, Rotberg served for 16 years on the board of directors of Martek Biosciences Corporation, the company responsible for synthesizing algae to produce omega-3 (DHA) used throughout the world in infant baby formulas. He also served as a trustee for the NPR Foundation; the Washington National Opera; the Theatre Lab in Washington, DC; Development Alternatives, Inc., a consulting firm primarily engaged in providing services under Agency for International Development contracts to developing countries; and the Institute for International Medicine, a nonprofit dedicated to providing health and social services to the poor throughout the world.

Rotberg had also served as a trustee, advisor, consultant, or officer of Czech & Slovak Investment Corporation Inc.; Sterling Venture Partners; Bard College; Fleming Investment Trust Management Limited; Lehman Bros. Financial Products; Fischer Francis Trees & Watts; the European Bank for Reconstruction and Development; the Inter-American Development Bank; and Merrill Lynch.

Rotberg was president of the Center for Contemporary Opera. For 16 years he had participated in the St. John's College Executive Seminars, which study the writings and philosophy of Greece and Rome and other classical writings. He also served on the advisory councils of the College of Liberal Arts at Temple University and the Graduate School of Education and Human Development at The George Washington University.

He and his wife of 62 years, Dr. Iris Rotberg, recently a research professor of education policy at The George Washington University Graduate School of Education and Human Development, were opera fanatics. He wrote a libretto for an opera, Tarhir. He and his wife were also avid collectors of Asian art and have coauthored three children's books, How Emma Stopped the World, Tess and the Dog Star, and Quinn's Search for the Samurai, dedicated to their grandchildren.

He was the godfather of Benjamin Wolf, the son of Martin Wolf, chief economics correspondent of Financial Times, and Alison Wolf, Baroness Wolf of Dulwich and professor at King's College, London.

Rotberg and his wife, Iris, established two family charitable foundations, The Rotberg Comens Booth Foundation and The Rotberg Comens Bray Foundation, which primarily make grants to organisations devoted to education and serving disadvantaged and lower-income communities.

Rotberg died on October 6, 2025, at the age of 95. His wife, Iris, died in January of the same year.

== Honors ==
- 1979: Inducted into the Central High School (Philadelphia) “Hall of Fame”
- 1992: Received the “Commandeur, De L’Ordre De Leopold II” honor from the Kingdom of Belgium for advice and implementation of new policies and regulations that opened up the Belgian capital markets and made them more competitive
- 2007: Named by Institutional Investor magazine as “one of the 40 most influential individuals in finance of the past 40 years”

== Additional sources ==
- Kapur, Devesh, Lewis, John, and Webb, Richard. (2010). The World Bank: Its First Half Century. Washington, DC: Brookings Institution Press.
- Transcript of Oral History, The World Bank, 1990.
- Transcript of Oral History, World Bank Archives, April 22, 1994.
- Transcript of Oral History, SEC Historical Society, May 14, 2007.
