= George Dilboy =

US Army soldier and Medal of Honor recipient

Private First Class George Dilboy
- Γεώργιος Διλβόης
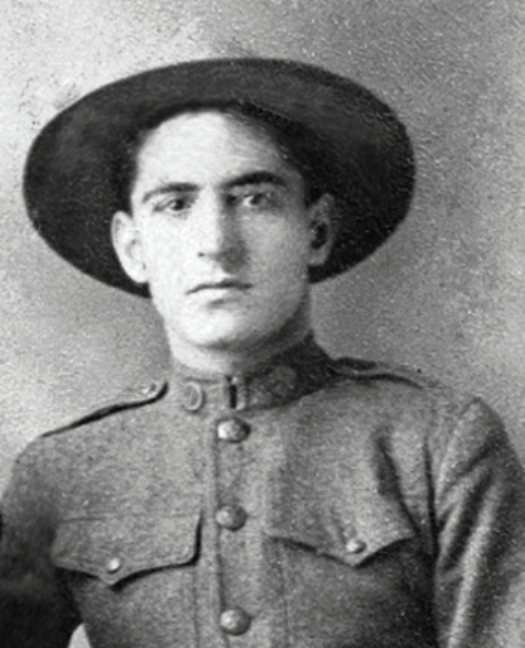
- George Dilboy c. 1916–18
- Born: Georgios Dilvois; February 5, 1896; Alatsata, Smyrna Vilayet, Ottoman Empire (now Turkey)
- Died: July 18, 1918 (aged 22); Near Belleau, French Third Republic
- Burial place: Arlington National Cemetery (Section 18)
- Military career
- Allegiance: Kingdom of Greece; United States of America
- Branch: Hellenic Army; United States Army
- Service years: 1912–1913 (Hellenic Army); 1916–1918 (U.S. Army)
- Rank: Private First Class
- Nickname: Dilly the Greek
- Service number: 68595
- Units: Army of Thessaly; 26th Infantry Division: 103rd Infantry Regiment
- Conflicts: Balkan Wars: First Balkan War; Second Balkan War; Border War; World War I: Western Front; Second Battle of the Marne †
- Awards: Medal of Honor

George Dilboy (Americanized transliteration of Greek name, Georgios Dilvois: Γεώργιος Διλβόης), (February 5, 1896 – July 18, 1918), Private First Class, U.S. Army, Company H, 103rd Infantry Regiment (United States), 26th Division is thought to be the first Greek-American to receive the Medal of Honor during World War I. He led an attack on a machine gun position and continued to fire at the enemy despite being seriously wounded, killing two of the enemy and dispersing the remainder of the gun crew. General John J. Pershing, commander of all the American forces in France during the war, listed George Dilboy as "one of the ten great heroes" who "died in the battlefield of France with super-human heroism and valor." Dilboy is buried in Section 18 of Arlington National Cemetery.

== Biography ==
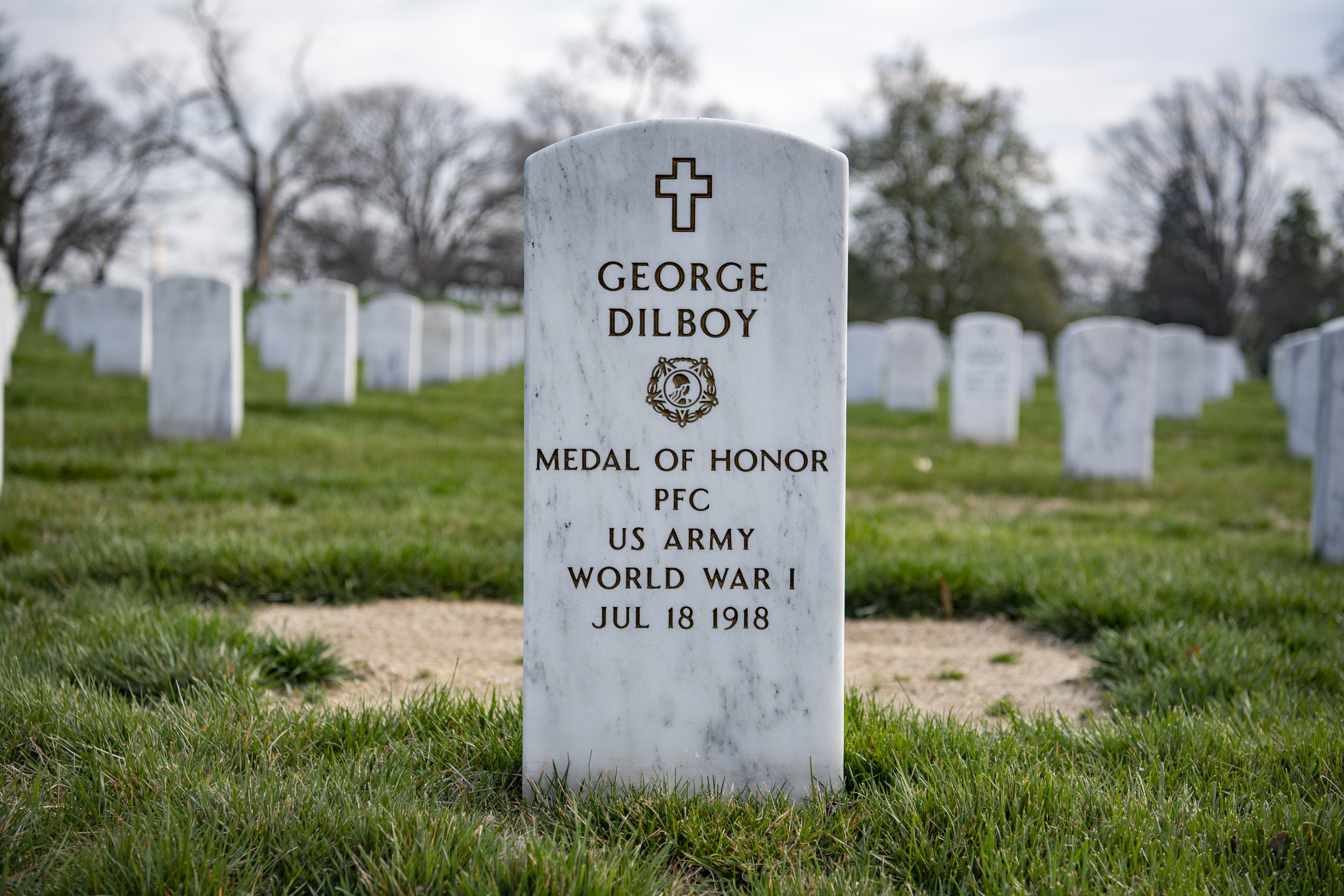
Grave at Arlington National Cemetery

Dilboy was born in the Greek town of Alatsata, in Ottoman Turkey in Asia Minor, near Smyrna. His father emigrated to the United States in 1908, and George later joined him in 1910, settling first in Somerville, Massachusetts. Dilboy returned to Greece in 1912 where he volunteered to fight in the Hellenic Army in Thessaly during the First Balkan War of 1912–13. He remained there to successfully fight in Macedonia in the Second Balkan War of 1913.

Returning to Somerville, he went to school and worked for a few years before volunteering to fight in the U.S. Army in the Mexican Border War in 1916–1917. He entered service at Keene, New Hampshire. He obtained an honorable discharge, but within months thereafter, re-joined the US Army to fight in France during World War I.

Dilboy was a member of the 26th "Yankee" Division, which arrived in France in fall 1917. On July 18, 1918, his company was given the mission to control the Bouresches railroad station as part of the Aisne-Marne counteroffensive. Dilboy gave his life during that action, dying at 9:30 am on the 18th.

== Medal of Honor ==
In January 1919, after Dilboy's death, the Commanding General of the Northeastern Department presented his Medal of Honor to his father, who said, "Under other circumstances I would have shed tears because of my son's death. But when I learned of the manner in which he died, I was proud that he had given his life with honor the cause of his adopted country, the United States. ... We came to this country from Smyrna, where my boy and other children were born, and we know and have felt the persecutions of Turkey."

== Medal of Honor citation ==
Rank and organization: Private First Class, U.S. Army, Company H, 103d Infantry, 26th Division. Place and date: Near Belleau, France, July 18, 1918. Entered service at: Keene, N.H. Birth: Greece. G.O. No.: 13, W.D., 1919.

Citation:

After his platoon had gained its objective along a railroad embankment, Pfc. Dilboy, accompanying his platoon leader to reconnoiter the ground beyond, was suddenly fired upon by an enemy machine gun from 100 yards. From a standing position on the railroad track, fully exposed to view, he opened fire at once, but failing to silence the gun, rushed forward with his bayonet fixed, through a wheat field toward the gun emplacement, falling within 25 yards of the gun with his right leg nearly severed above the knee and with several bullet holes in his body. With undaunted courage he continued to fire into the emplacement from a prone position, killing 2 of the enemy and dispersing the rest of the crew.

== Burial ==
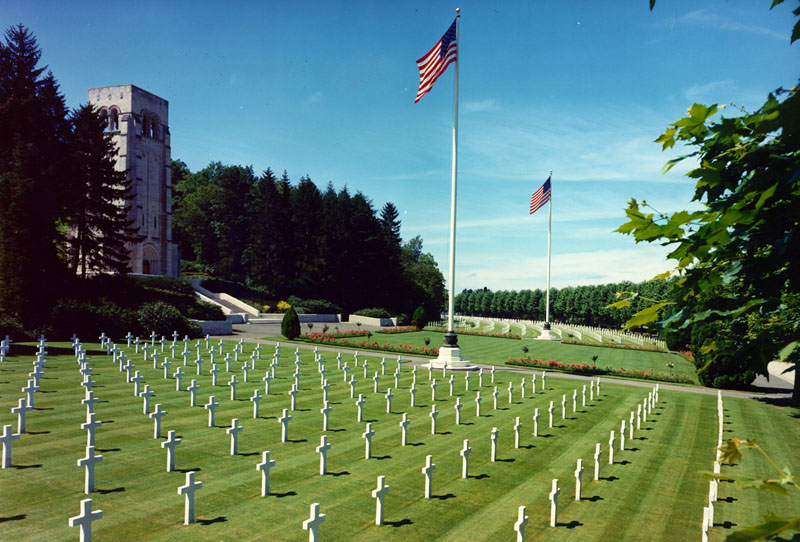
Aisne-Marne American Cemetery, where Dilboy was initially buried

Dilboy was initially buried at Aisne-Marne American Cemetery in Belleau, France.

At the request of his father, Dilboy was later buried at his birthplace, Alatsata, which was then a predominantly Greek city. After a funeral procession through the streets of his birthplace—said to have been witnessed by 17,000 mourners—his flag-draped casket was placed in the Greek Orthodox Church of the Presentation in Alatsata to lie in state before the high altar. But rampaging Turkish soldiers soon seized the town and during the three-year Greco-Turkish War of 1919–22, Turkish troops recaptured Smyrna and the surrounding region from the Greeks. The church was ransacked and Dilboy's grave desecrated. The American flag was stolen from atop Dilboy's coffin. The coffin was overturned, after which—according to an account by Bishop John Kallos—the bones of the Greek-American war hero were scattered by the marauding attackers.

President Warren G. Harding was outraged and sent the warship USS Litchfield to Turkey in September 1922 to recover the bodily remains. Harding also demanded and received a formal apology from the Turkish government. Dilboy's remains were collected and a Turkish guard of honor delivered his casket (draped once again in an American flag) to an American landing party in Smyrna. His remains were taken aboard the USS Litchfield and returned to the United States. On November 12, 1923, he was buried with full military honors at Arlington National Cemetery, where his gravestone proclaims his Medal of Honor status.

Dilboy had the distinction of being honored by three U.S. Presidents: Woodrow Wilson signed the authorization awarding him the Medal of Honor, Warren G. Harding brought his remains back to Arlington National Cemetery, and Calvin Coolidge presided at his final burial.

== Memorials and namesakes ==
Several institutions in Somerville, Massachusetts, where Dilboy lived upon first immigrating to the U.S., bear his name. One of Somerville's two Veterans of Foreign Wars posts, Post #529, is named for him. The George Dilboy Post is located at 371 Summer Street.

Dilboy Field, a recreation field in West Somerville, was dedicated to him in 1921. In 1953, Dilboy Stadium opened on the site. By the early 2000s, the stadium had fallen into disrepair. State Senator Charlie Shannon lobbied the state government intensively for the $8 million necessary to demolish and replace the stadium. Shannon died before the project's completion, and there were plans to name the replacement stadium after Shannon instead of Dilboy. The renaming was scratched after Somerville's Greek and military veteran communities spoke out in favor of retaining the name Dilboy. The replacement Dilboy Stadium opened in September 2006.

There is a monument honoring Dilboy in front of Somerville's City Hall. It consists of a bronze bust standing on a granite base. It was created in 1930 by the Grenier Studio in Boston. The Order of AHEPA presented it to the City of Somerville. The monument inspired Eddie Brady, a Somerville resident, to fictionalize George Dilboy's life in the novel Georgie! My Georgie!

On May 24, 1942, the George Dilboy Memorial Foundation erected a memorial to Dilboy at the Hines Veterans Administration Hospital in Hines, Illinois, a western suburb of Chicago.

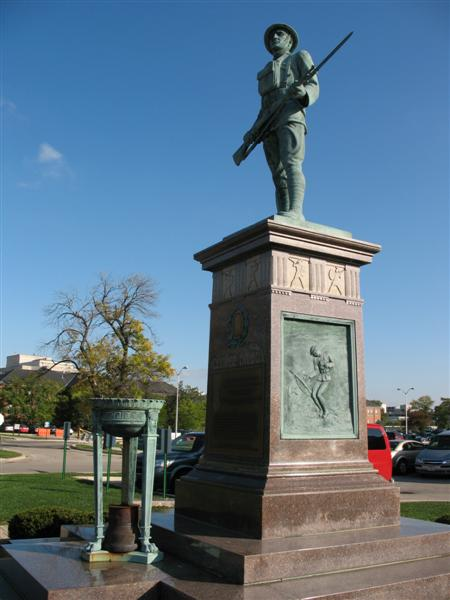
George Dilboy Memorial statue at Hines VA Hospital

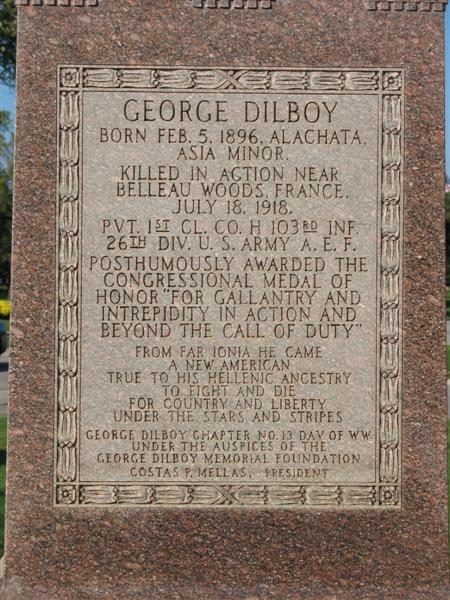
Dilboy Memorial inscription on base

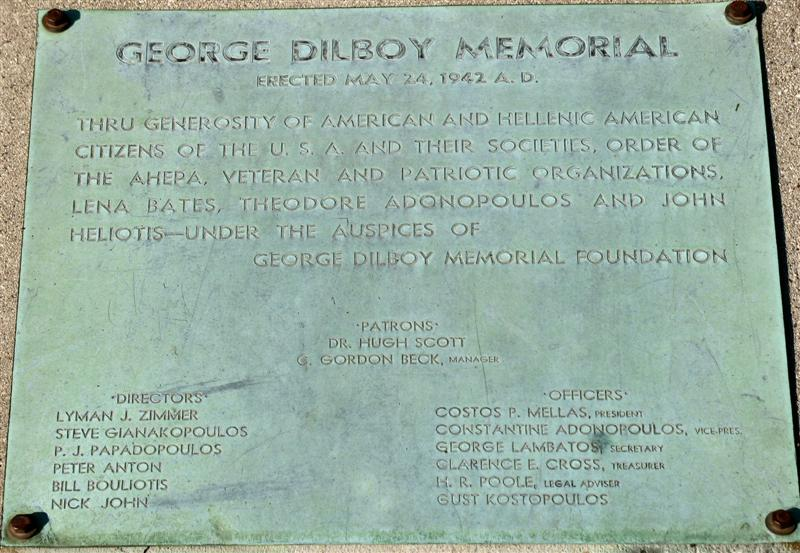
Dilboy Memorial inscription plaque

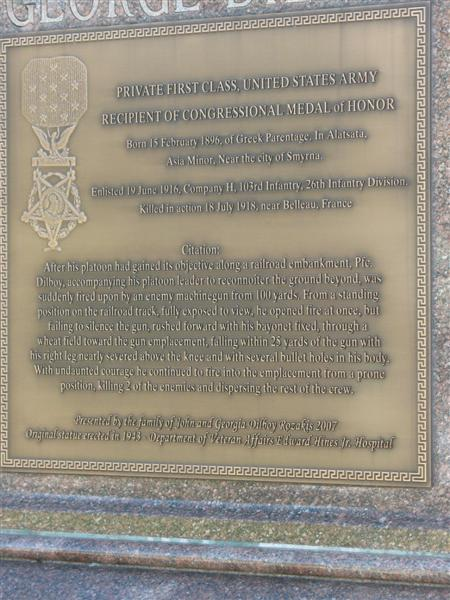
Dilboy Memorial Medal of Honor Plaque

In 2009, a U.S. Citizenship and Immigration Services facility in Detroit was named in Dilboy's honor.

== See also ==
- List of Medal of Honor recipients for World War I
