= Alaçatı =

Town in İzmir, Turkey

- Neighbourhood
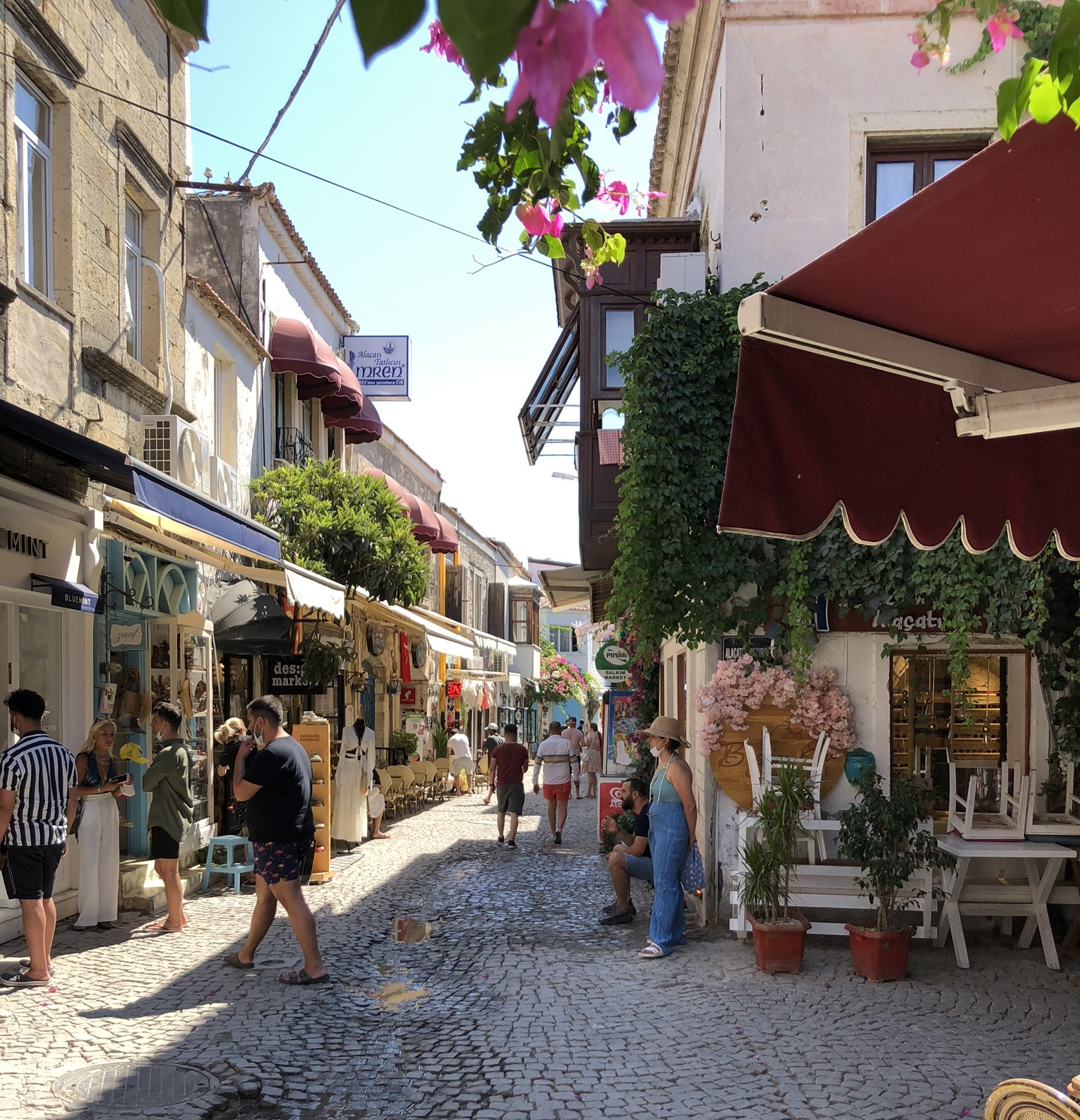
- A street in Alaçatı

- Location within Turkey Location within İzmir
- Coordinates: 38°16′53″N 26°22′27″E
- Country: Turkey
- Province: İzmir
- District: Çeşme
- Elevation: 16 m (52 ft)
- Population (2022): 10,386
- Time zone: UTC+3 (TRT)
- Area code: 0232

Alaçatı is a neighbourhood in the municipality and district of Çeşme, İzmir Province, Turkey. Its population is 10,386 (2022). Before the 2013 reorganisation, it was a town (belde). It is on the Western coast of Turkey, often noted for its architecture, vineyards, windmills, and sea.

Alaçatı is one of the most traditional towns in Turkey, it is famed for its former Greek village with stone houses, narrow streets, boutique hotels and restaurants with tables on the streets. The area is also home to the Alaçatı yacht marina and the famous Port Alaçatı development, created by the French architect Francois Spoerry and his son, Yves Spoerry.

== Etymology ==
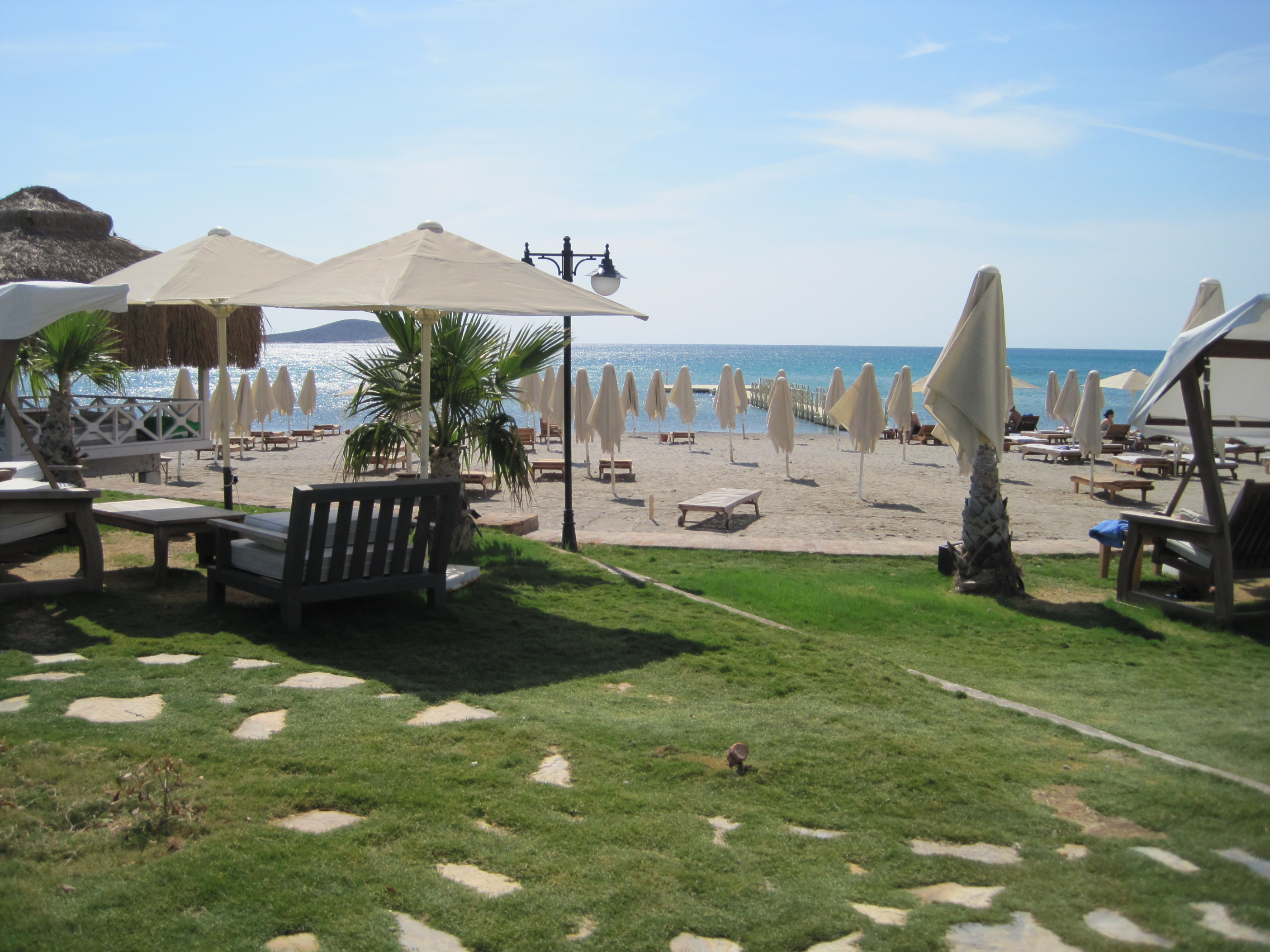
Alaçatı coast

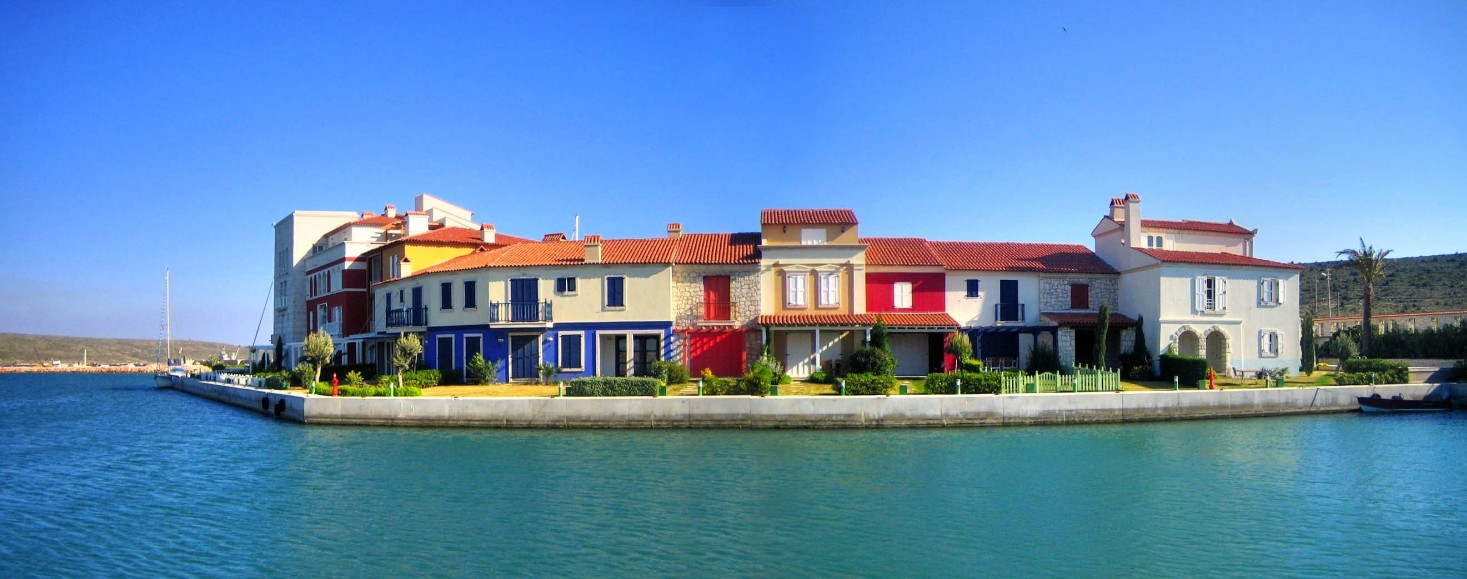
Alaçatı houses at the coast

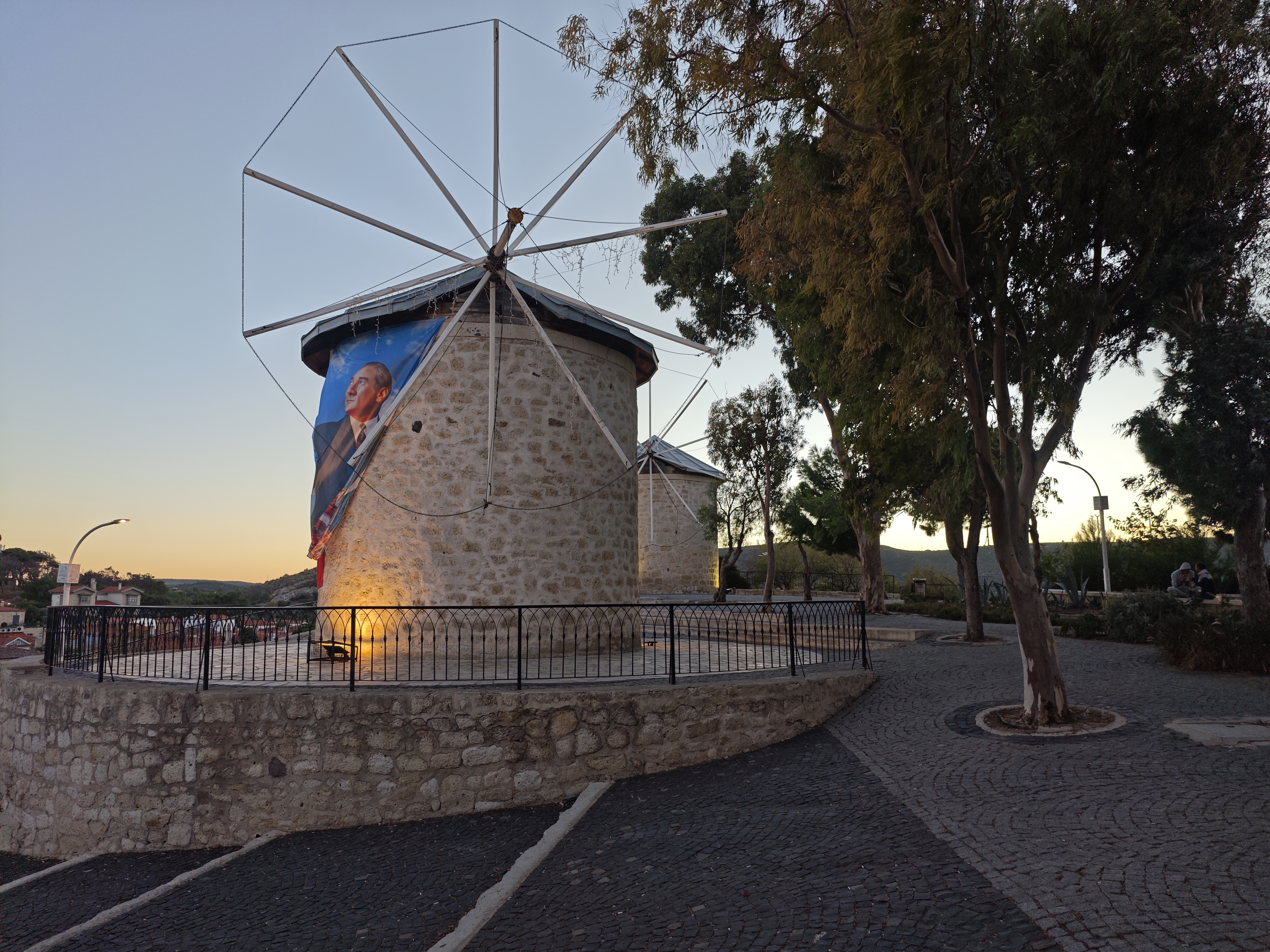
Alaçatı Windmills

There are various theories about the formation of the name of Alaçatı. Some sources claim that the name of the city formulated in the plural number and is considered to have its origin from the ancient Greek word ἅλς (als) - ἅλας (alas), "salt", plural ἅλατα (alata), "salts", in the Demotic Greek αλάτι (alati), "salt", plural αλάτια (alatia), "salts", which enunciate as Alatzata and Alatsata either due to Turkish alteration of the language (e.g. in Turkish, the word “kalderim” (meaning cobbled road - originated from the Greek kallidromon) or according to a local Greek dialect. During the Ottoman Empire, the word is referred to as the adjective «the alatsatikos» which was a tax collected on salt. The older pronunciation and spelling of the name «Alatzata» seems to disappear at the end of the 19th century. The phoneme –tz then turned to the refined and elegant form of the Greek phoneme -ts. Other resources claim, however, the name Alaca At (Red Horse in Turkish) used for the whole area. Their claim is based on a story, that the ruler of Alaçatı had a red horse to ride. When riding the horse, bystanders would refer to him as "Alacaatlı (the man with the red horse)", in time the name was somehow changed to Alaçatı. Some resources claim that the name "Ala çatı" (Iridescent Roof) derives from strong winds causing laundries to fly away and land on neighbour houses.

According to the statistics of the High Commission of Smyrna in May 1914, the number of Greek inhabitants of Alatsata that were forced by the Turks to be expatriated were 14.000. Muslim refugees from Greece were settled here, and ever since then the name Alaçatı has been adopted both for the town and the harbour area. The harbour area was called 'Agrilia' (Greek: Αγριλιά, "wild olive tree"), and was the export port of İzmir until World War II. After the war, the harbour's use declined, and the bay, in which the harbour was, is now popular among windsurfers. The town also hosts a lap of the world tournament of windsurfing, famously called PWA.

== History ==
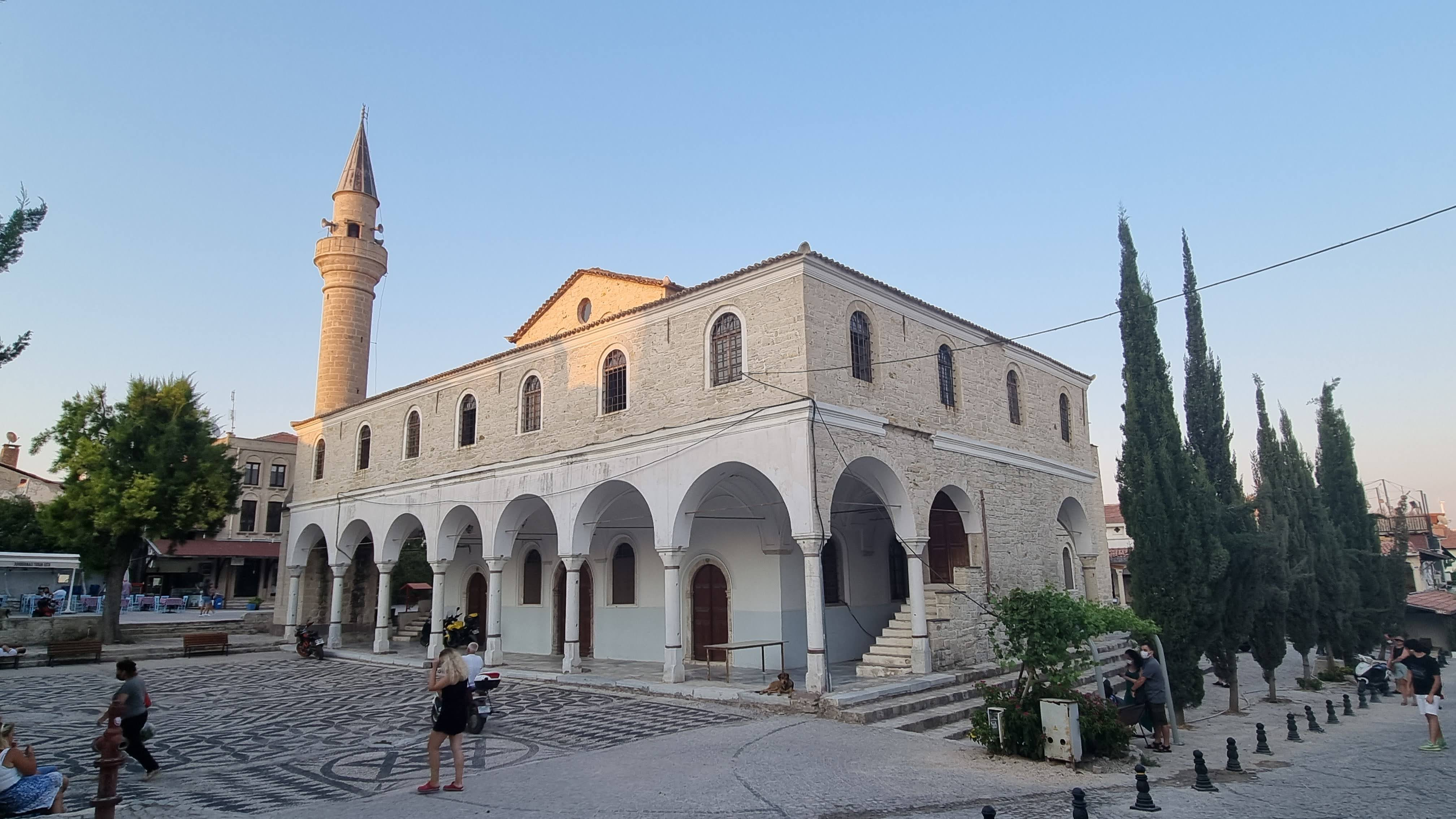
Alaçatı Pazaryeri Camii (Ayios Konstantinos Greek Church)

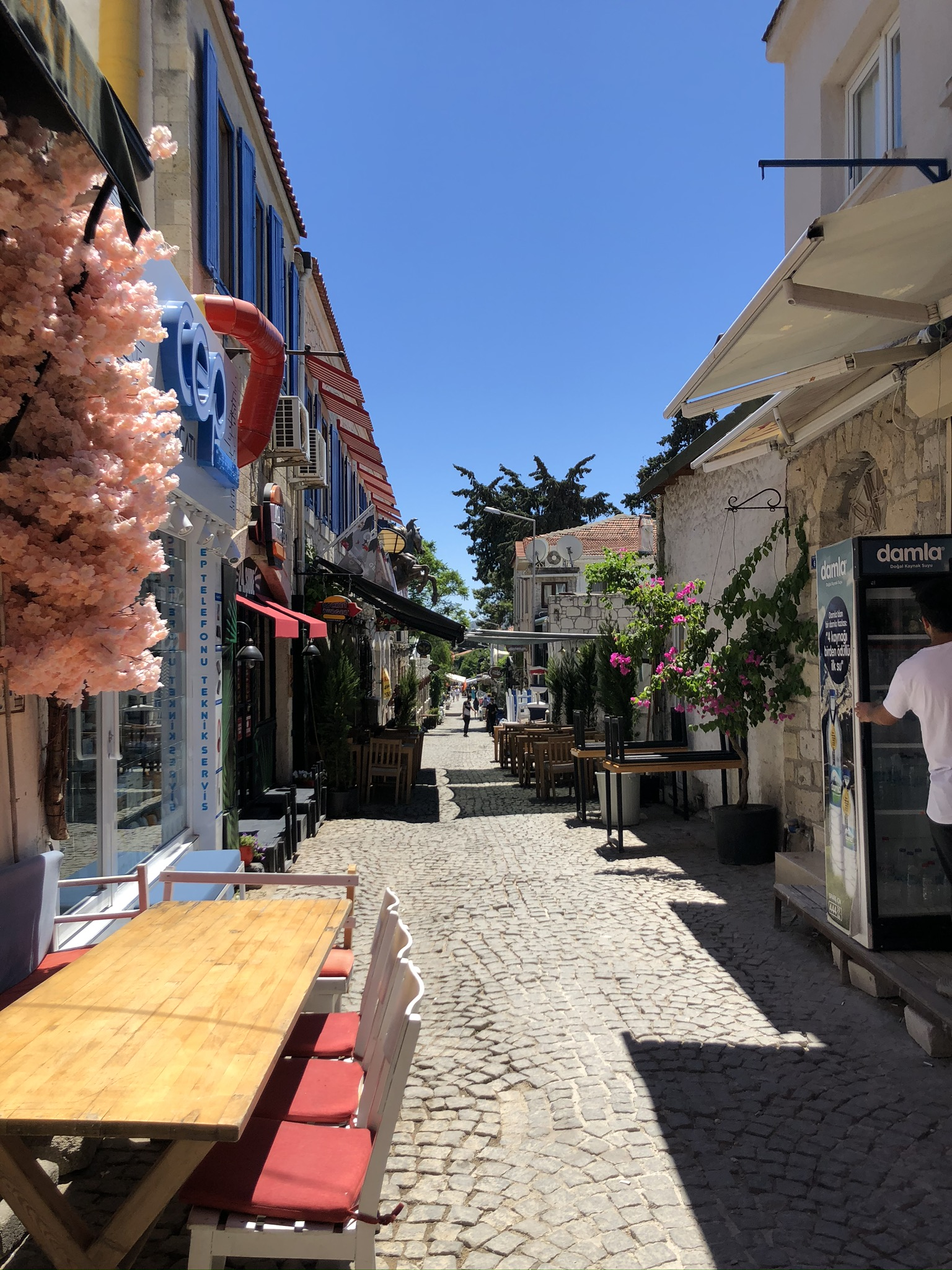
Typically, enclosed cumba balconies are painted by lilac or pale blue colours.

Alaçatı became an Ottoman town in the 14th century, according to some; in the 15th century, according to others. Regardless of the date, Alaçatı was originally settled or founded by Greeks in the 17th century. The Muslim population was only 132 out of a population of 13,845 in 1895. After the defeat of the Ottomans in the Balkan Wars, Ottoman Muslims moved to the western coast of Anatolia, to accommodate them, the Ottomans implemented a programme of expulsions and forcible migrations of Greeks of the Aegean region and eastern Thrace, whose presence in these areas was also deemed a threat to national security. Some of the Greek population who survived the forced removal returned in 1919 during Greek administration of Smyrna (1919-1922) when the Hellenic Army occupied the region of Izmir. However, following Greece's defeat in the Greco-Turkish War, the majority fled from the Greek genocide, the few remaining were killed or fled during the Burning of Smyrna. The forced emigration of the Greek population, already at an advanced stage, was transformed into a population exchange backed by questionable international legal guarantees.

Under the Treaty of Lausanne in 1923 and according to the implementation of the compulsory exchange of populations, Muslims who fled Crete, Thrace, Macedonia and Dodecanese settled in Alatsata city in the houses abandoned by the Greeks. Most of these houses still remain in Alaçatı as an attraction for people to see.

== Architecture ==
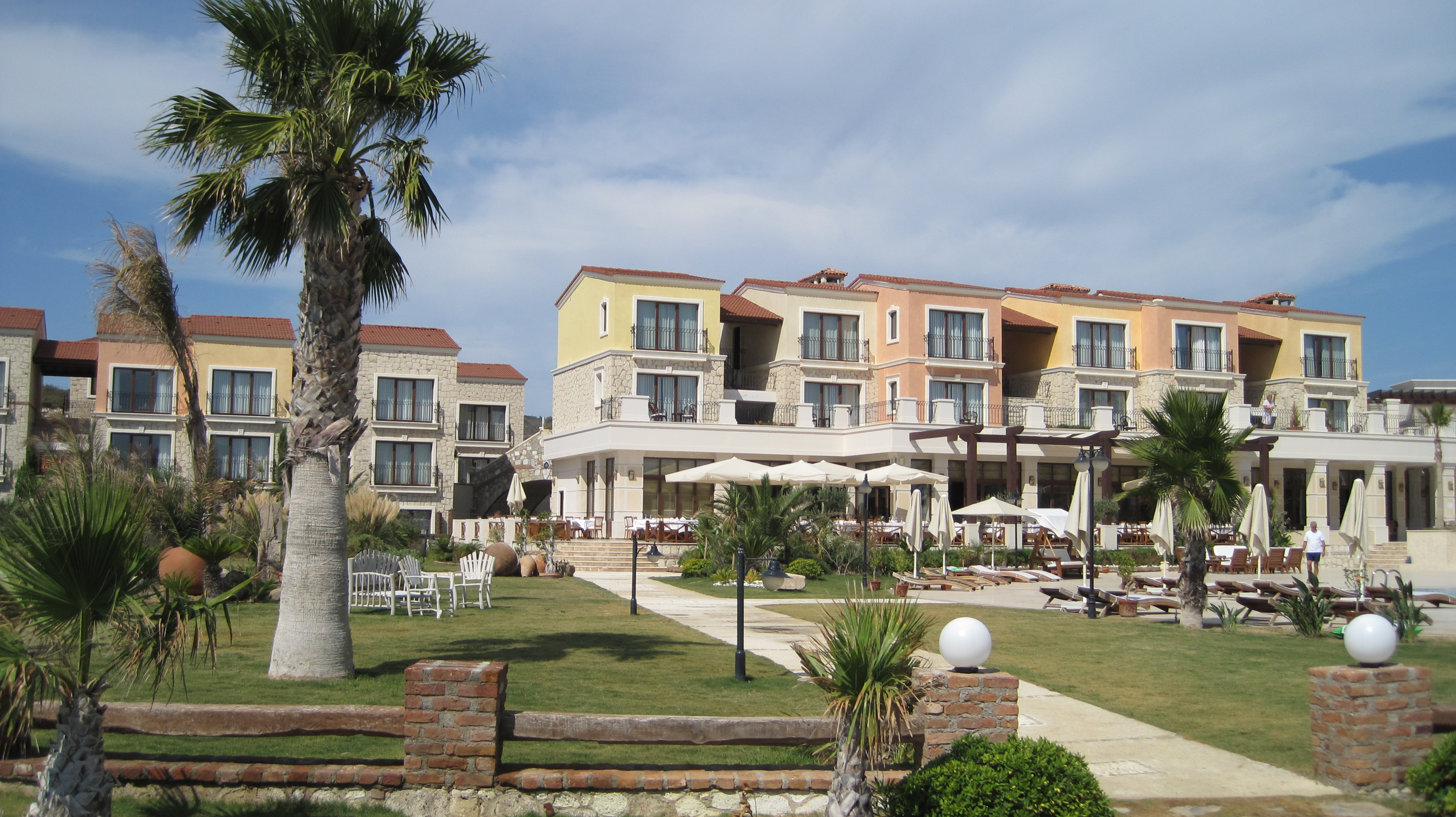
A hotel in Alaçatı

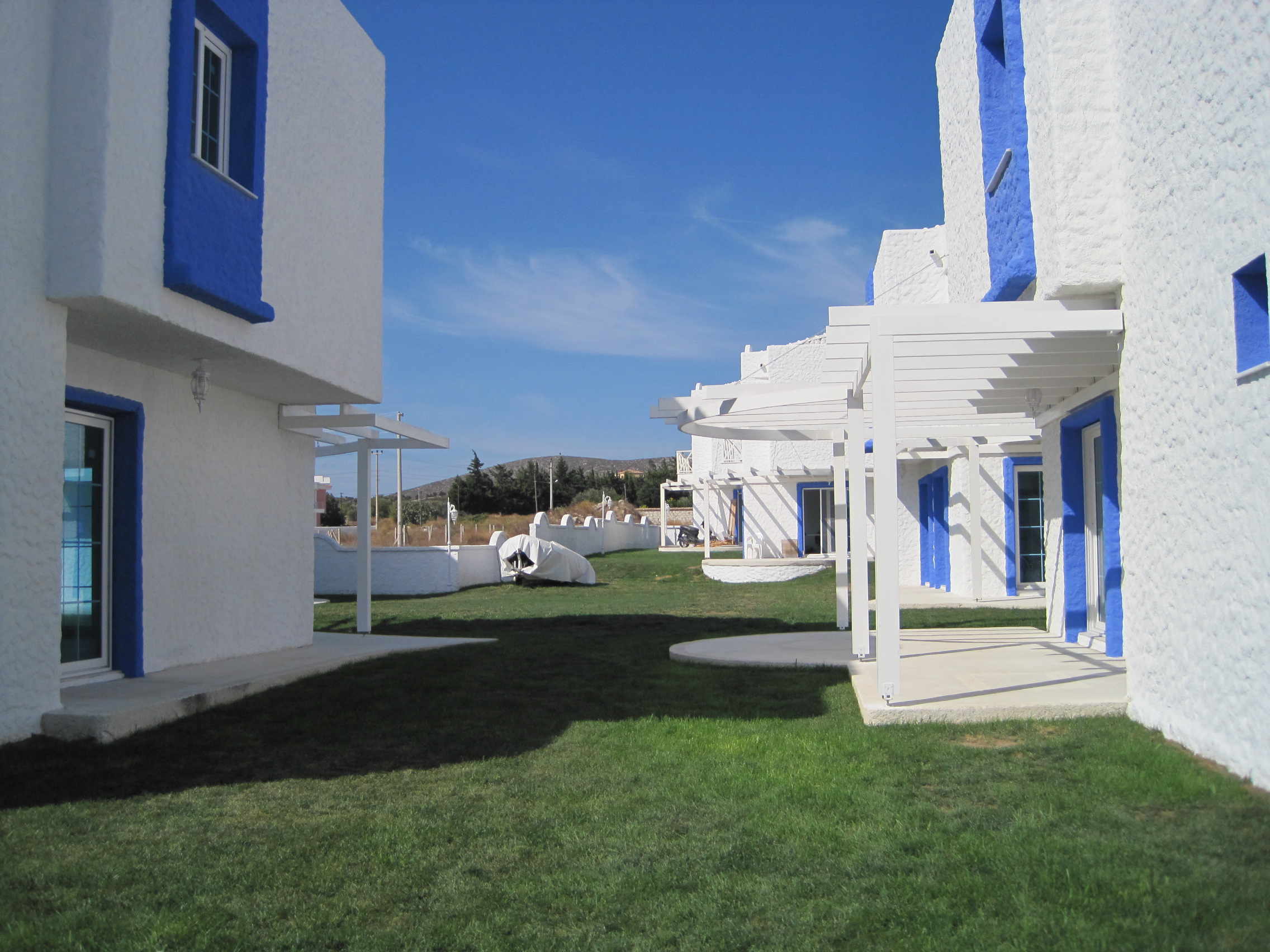
Alaçatı modern architecture example

Alaçatı has stone houses with coloured windows and narrow streets with pavements. The centre of Alaçatı has houses from the Ottoman period; the ones that belonged to Ottoman Greeks are distinct, by having an additional enclosed balcony area, alcove window or cumba in Turkish. Typically, enclosed cumba balconies are painted by lilac or pale blue colors. The town was declared as a historical site in 2005; the buildings are well protected. The newly built houses refer to the past architectural principles of the Ottoman houses of the agora of Alaçatı.

== Culture ==
The experiences of novelist Mehmet Culum during his travels in the region inspired him to write Alaçatili, his second novel. The very centre of Alaçatı is famous for viticulture and winemaking as wine factories spread throughout the region of Çeşme but recently the town has picked fame with its developing tourism, boutique hotels and especially with windsurfing.

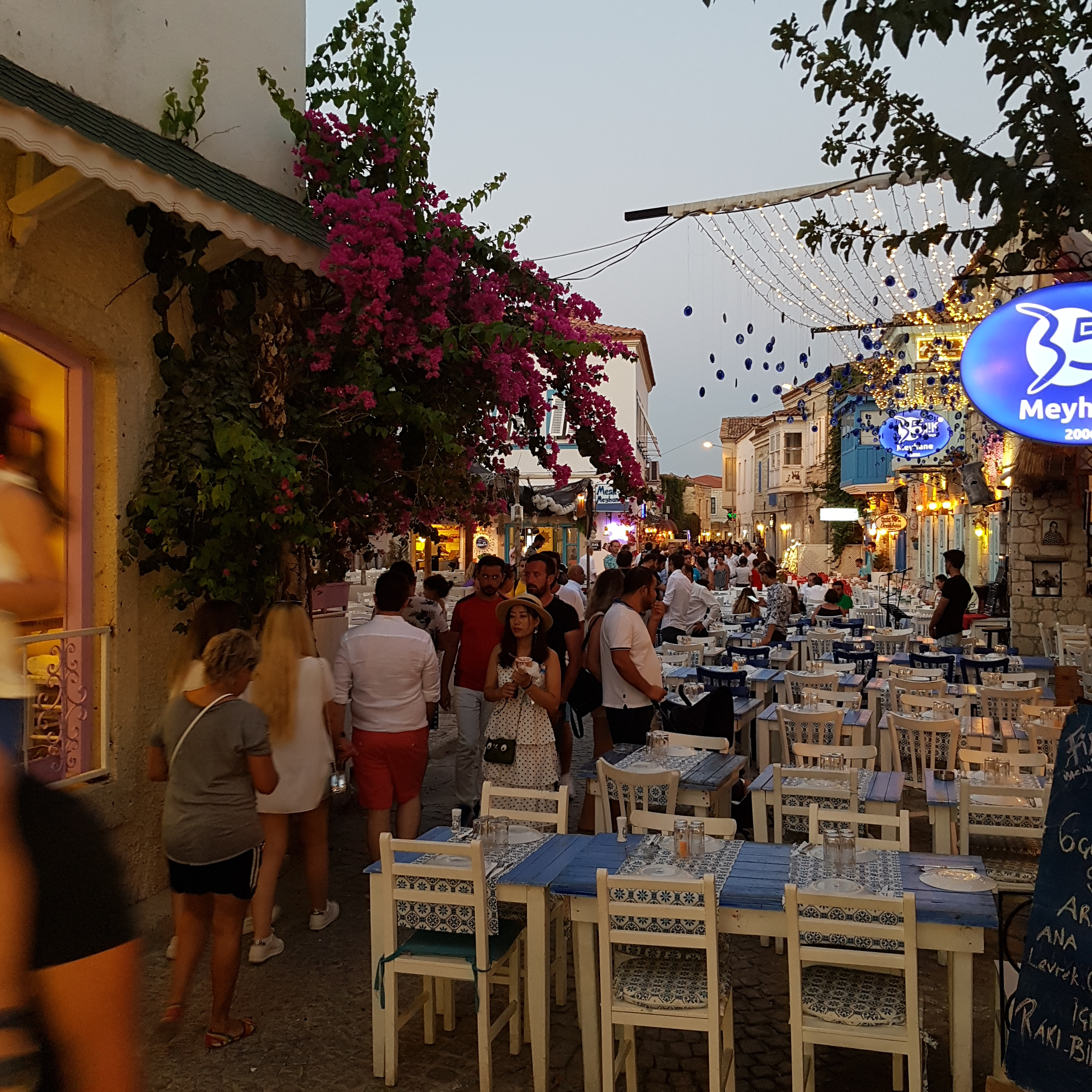
Restaurants at Alaçatı

== Festivals ==
The Alaçatı Herb Festival takes place every year in April and aims to promote nature-friendly methods in gastronomy and natural nutrition through the introduction of the area's many herb varieties. Traditional ingredients and cooking techniques are celebrated during a time when the region-specific herbs bloom. In 2017, Alaçatı welcome a new festival called ‘Kaybolan Lezzetler Festivali,’ also known as the ‘Festival of the Disappearing Tastes’ sought to preserve traditional recipes that are facing extinction. Various recipes from different regions are researched and chosen and then promulgated through workshops, events and contests with the final aim of documenting twisted versions of traditional recipes of Alaçatı on a book.

== Mastic ==
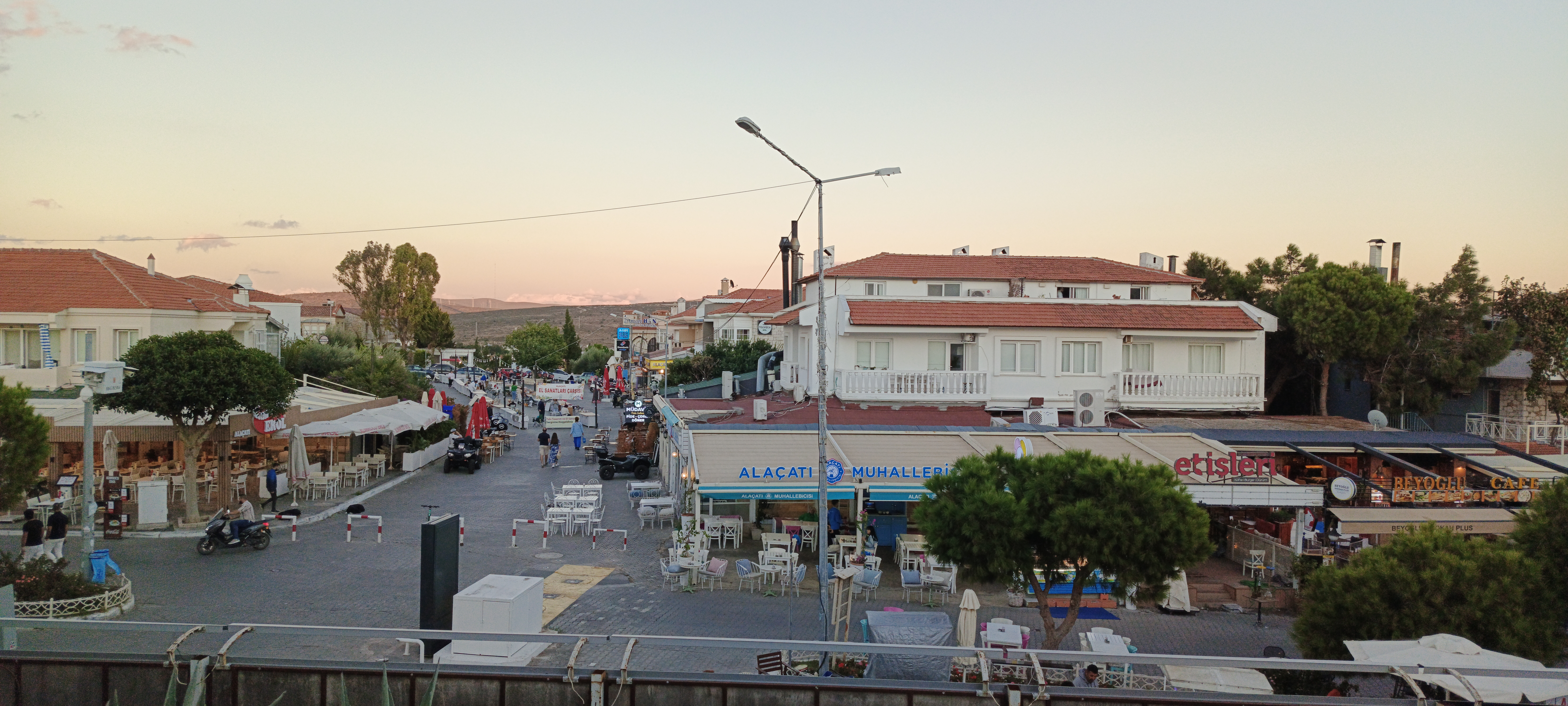
Alaçatı center of the old town.

Mastic is a natural resin that runs down when a mastic tree (Pistacia lentiscus) is cut. Originally mastic is sun-dried into pieces of brittle, resulting in producing translucent resin. When chewed, the resin softens and becomes a bright natural white and opaque gummy substance. The flavour is bitter at first, but after some chewing, it releases a refreshing, Mediterranean-maple-syrup-like flavour, however it has a stickier texture than maple syrup.

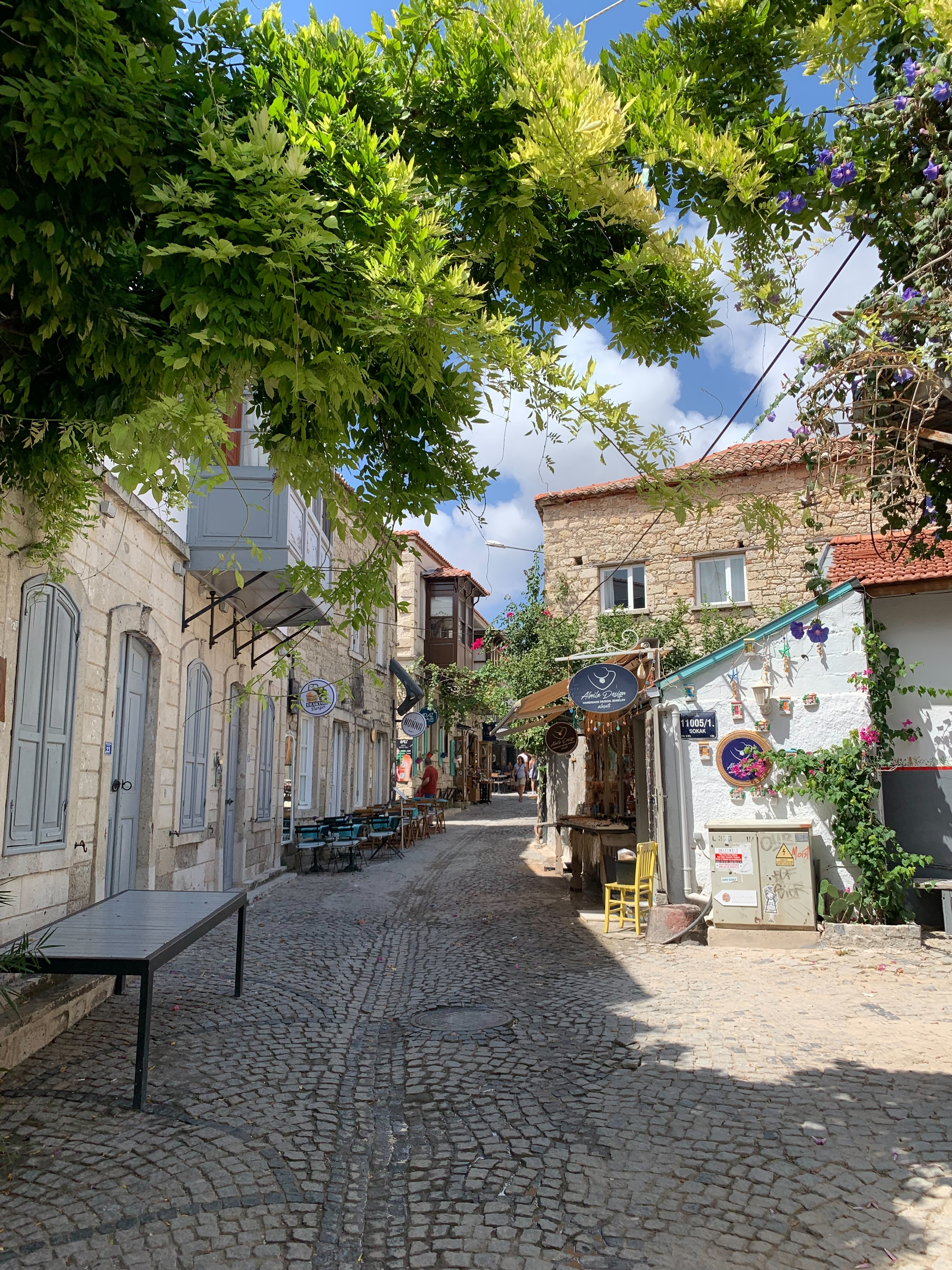
A cobblestone street in Alaçatı

TEMA, The Turkish Foundation for Combating Soil Erosion for Reforestation and the Protection of Natural Habitats, has been leading a project to protect the native mastic trees and to plant new ones in Çeşme peninsula to revive viable commercial production. As part of this project, which is expected to last through 2016, over 3,000 mastic tree saplings were planted between 2008 and October 2011 to over 368 acres (149 hectares) of dedicated farm areas provided by the Izmir Institute of Technology. From a 15-50-year-old mastic tree, 300-350 grams of mastic can be collected a year. Price standardisation of mastic meets 100-120 Euro per kilo.

Traditionally, mastic pudding and mastic ice cream would be consumed after dining. Specialities made with mastic are offered in the whole town of Alaçatı, as well as Çeşme. Some popular mastic delicacies of the town follow as mastic Turkish coffee or Turkish coffee served with mastic water, mastic pudding, mastic ice cream, mastic jam, mastic biscuit balls, as well as the savoury meze of mastic artichoke.

== Windsurfing ==
Alaçatı is nominated by numerous windsurfing magazines as the best spot for beginners to learn windsurfing due to having a shallow bay that makes beginners to feel safe. Alaçatı bay which is known as one of the world's leading windsurfing bays with continuous and steady wind throughout the year. Alaçatı also offers good waves for freestyle windsurfers when the wind blows from the south. Alaçatı windsurf schools meet the international standards by offering material for canoeing, kitesurfing, sup and windsurfing. Alaçatı recently has made a name for hosting international windsurfing championships and tournaments and world's most known windsurfing tournament PWA. PWA racers nicknamed Alaçatı as 'the Slalom Capital of the world'.

== Media coverage ==
In 2004, a documentary on the town was aired on a Japanese television program hosted by Nana Eikura. Since then, the town has attracted numerous Asian tourists. In 2010, Alaçatı was ranked 8th by the New York Times on top places to visit in 2010.

== Toponyms ==
Several cities have been named after Alatsata, including Nea Alatsata, Crete; Nea Erythraia, Athens, Greece. A great number of Alatsatean refugees were settled in Greece after they were forcibly removed from their homeland, in Attica, Euboea, Crete, Chios, Lesvos, Samos, Thessaloniki and in Agrinion. Regions with settlements, bearing the name New Alatsata ("Νέα Αλάτσατα" in Greek) exist in the Municipality of Vyron, in Athens, in Chalkis and in Heraklion of Crete. Besides Greece, Alatsateans migrated to almost all continents but mostly to the United States of America, where in Somerville, in Boston the Small Alatsata was founded.

== Notable natives ==
- George Dilboy (1896–1918), Greek American soldier, and first Greek American who received the Congressional Medal of Honor for his service to the United States during World War I. He was buried in Alatsata and his grave was desecrated by the Turkish army.
- Iakovos Makrygiannis (1910–1971), Greek metropolitan bishop of Elassona
- Çağla Kubat (born 1979), Turkish windsurfer

== See also ==
- Erythrae
- Ionia
- Greek genocide
