= Jimmy Diaz =

United States Virgin Islands windsurfer

Personal information
- Full name: James Scott Diaz
- Nationality: American Virgin Islander
- Born: November 17, 1968 (age 56)

Sport
- Sport: Windsurfing

James Scott "Jimmy" Diaz (born November 17, 1968) is a windsurfer who represented the United States Virgin Islands. He competed in the men's Lechner A-390 event at the 1992 Summer Olympics.

Diaz married Turkish surfer Çağla Kubat on 21 September 2013.
