= John Olcay =

Turkish-American financier

- Born: Önder John Olcay; 1940; İzmir, Turkey
- Died: 17 October 2014 (aged 73–74); New York City, United States
- Citizenship: American
- Occupation: Financier
- Known for: Development of asset management services to central banks
- Spouse: Phoebe Miller (m. 1985) (second wife)
- Children: 3

Önder John Olcay (1940 - 17 October 2014) was a Turkish-American financier who was instrumental in the development of asset management services to central banks. As a partner of W. Greenwell & Co., he was also one of the first members of the London Stock Exchange not born in the UK or the British Commonwealth.

Economist Adam Posen described him as "a trusted advisor to Central Bankers in particular around the world from Singapore to Switzerland and in between".

== Early life ==
Önder Olcay was born in İzmir in 1940, the son of Nahide (a lawyer and judge) and Süreyya Olcay. He studied at Robert College in Istanbul, then at the Wharton School of the University of Pennsylvania where he obtained a Master of Arts and Master of Business Administration.

== Career ==
Going by John Olcay while living in the United States, he then became a Vice President at the Bank of New York, helping to establish their first international office in London. In the late 1960s, he started advising global Netherlands-based insurer Aegon N.V., of which he was later a supervisory board member from 1993 to 2008.

In 1974, Olcay initiated a joint offering with the recently established Fischer Francis Trees & Watts (FFTW) to advise central banks and other investors on their management of US dollar-denominated assets. In 1983, Olcay joined FFTW on a full-time basis, and subsequently became a vice chairman and managing director of the firm.

== Personal life and legacy ==
John Olcay had a son, John R. Olcay, from a first marriage. He married Phoebe Miller on 19 October 1985. They had two daughters, Margot and Charlotte. He died in 2014 in New York of prostate cancer.

The Peterson Institute for International Economics has run a series of annual lectures in memory of John Olcay starting in 2015, the year after his death. The lectures were given by George Akerlof (2015), Sheila Bair (2016), Alan Blinder (2017), Eric S. Rosengren (2018), Stephen G. Cecchetti (2019), Benjamin M. Friedman (2021), and Thomas Jordan (2022).

== See also ==
- List of people from İzmir
