= USS Litchfield =

Clemson-class destroyer

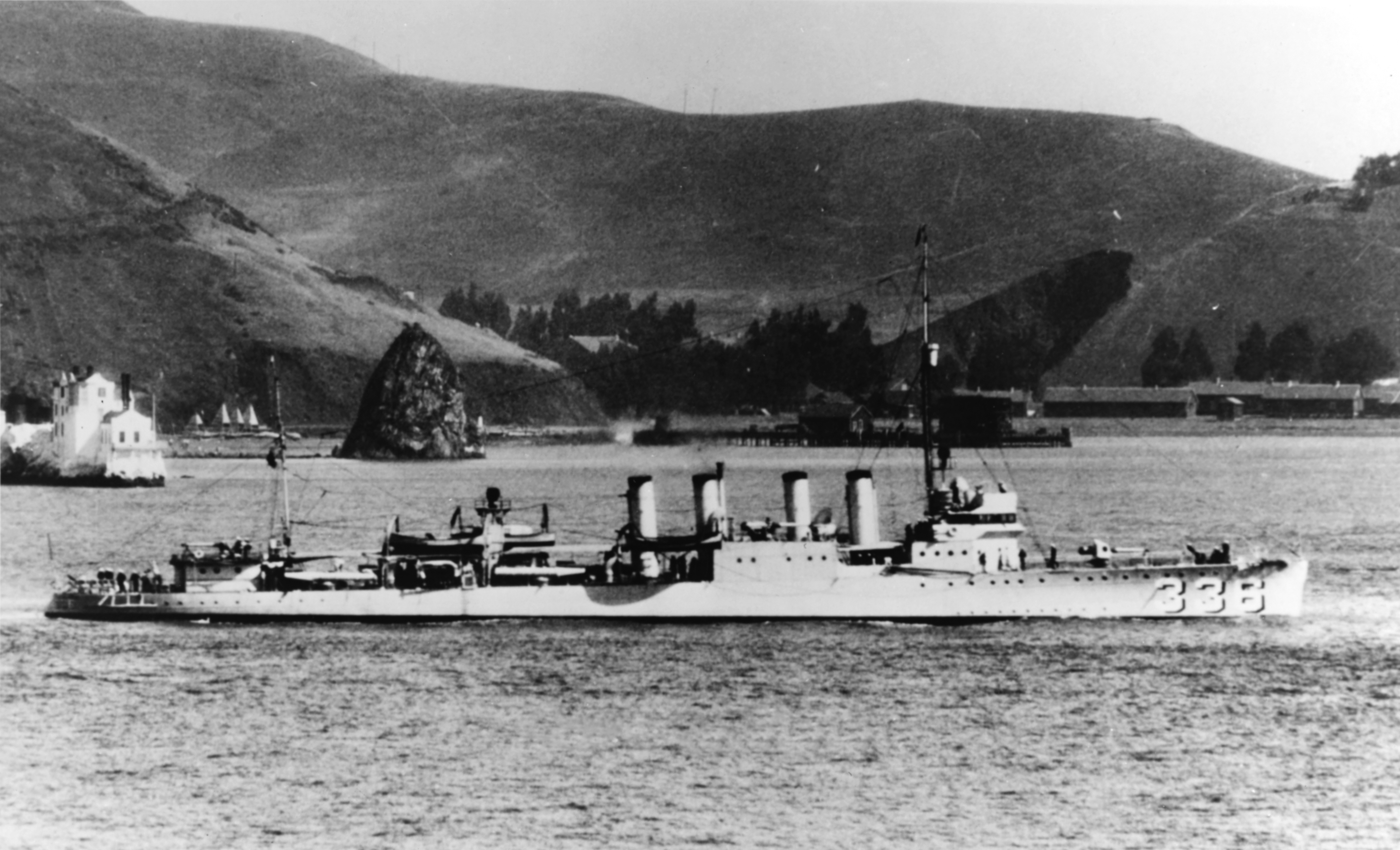
- USS Litchfield (DD-336) underway before World War II

History

United States
- Name: Litchfield
- Namesake: John Litchfield
- Builder: Mare Island Naval Shipyard
- Laid down: 15 January 1919
- Launched: 12 August 1919
- Commissioned: 12 May 1920
- Decommissioned: 5 November 1945
- Stricken: 28 November 1945
- Fate: Sold for scrap, 29 March 1946

General characteristics
- Class & type: Clemson-class destroyer
- Displacement: 1,215 tons
- Length: 314 ft 5 in (95.83 m)
- Beam: 30 ft 11 1/2 in (9.436 m)
- Draft: 9 ft 4 in (2.84 m)
- Propulsion: 26,500 shp (19,800 kW); Geared turbines; 2 screws
- Speed: 35 knots (65 km/h; 40 mph)
- Range: 4,900 nmi (9,100 km; 5,600 mi) at 15 knots (28 km/h; 17 mph)
- Complement: 126 officers and enlisted
- Armament: 4 × 4 in (102 mm)/50 guns; 1 × 3 in (76 mm)/25 gun; 12 × 21 in (533 mm) torpedo tubes

USS Litchfield (DD-336/AG-95) was a Clemson-class destroyer in the United States Navy following World War I.

== Namesake ==
John R. Litchfield was born on 7 March 1899 at Flanagan, Illinois. He was a Navy pharmacist's mate serving with the 6th Marine Regiment. He was killed on 15 September 1918 near Thiaucourt, France, while attempting to remove a casualty from a frontline trench. He was posthumously awarded the Navy Cross as well as the Distinguished Service Cross.

== History ==
Litchfield was laid down on 15 January 1919 by Mare Island Navy Yard. The vessel was launched on 12 August 1919, sponsored by Mrs. Martha D. Litchfield, the mother of Pharmacist's Mate Litchfield. The destroyer was commissioned on 12 May 1920. Litchfield, a flush-decker, sailed to Bremerton, Washington, on her shakedown cruise but her initial tour on the west coast was brief. Before the end of 1921 she had departed San Diego, California and arrived in Charleston, South Carolina. Following the annual fleet maneuvers, Litchfield steamed to Newport, Rhode Island, to join Division 39 for duty in the eastern Mediterranean Sea, arriving at Constantinople on 28 June 1922.

The division served under the direct command of Rear Admiral Mark L. Bristol, U.S. High Commissioner for Turkey. The Allied Commissioners were attempting to end a war between this former ally of Germany and Greece. Litchfield served in humanitarian causes and as an instrument of American foreign policy as Admiral Bristol's destroyers evacuated 262,000 Greek and Armenian refugees from Smyrna, Turkey, 13 September. The destroyers also assisted civilian relief agencies attempting to feed and evacuate additional thousands suffering from famine and war.

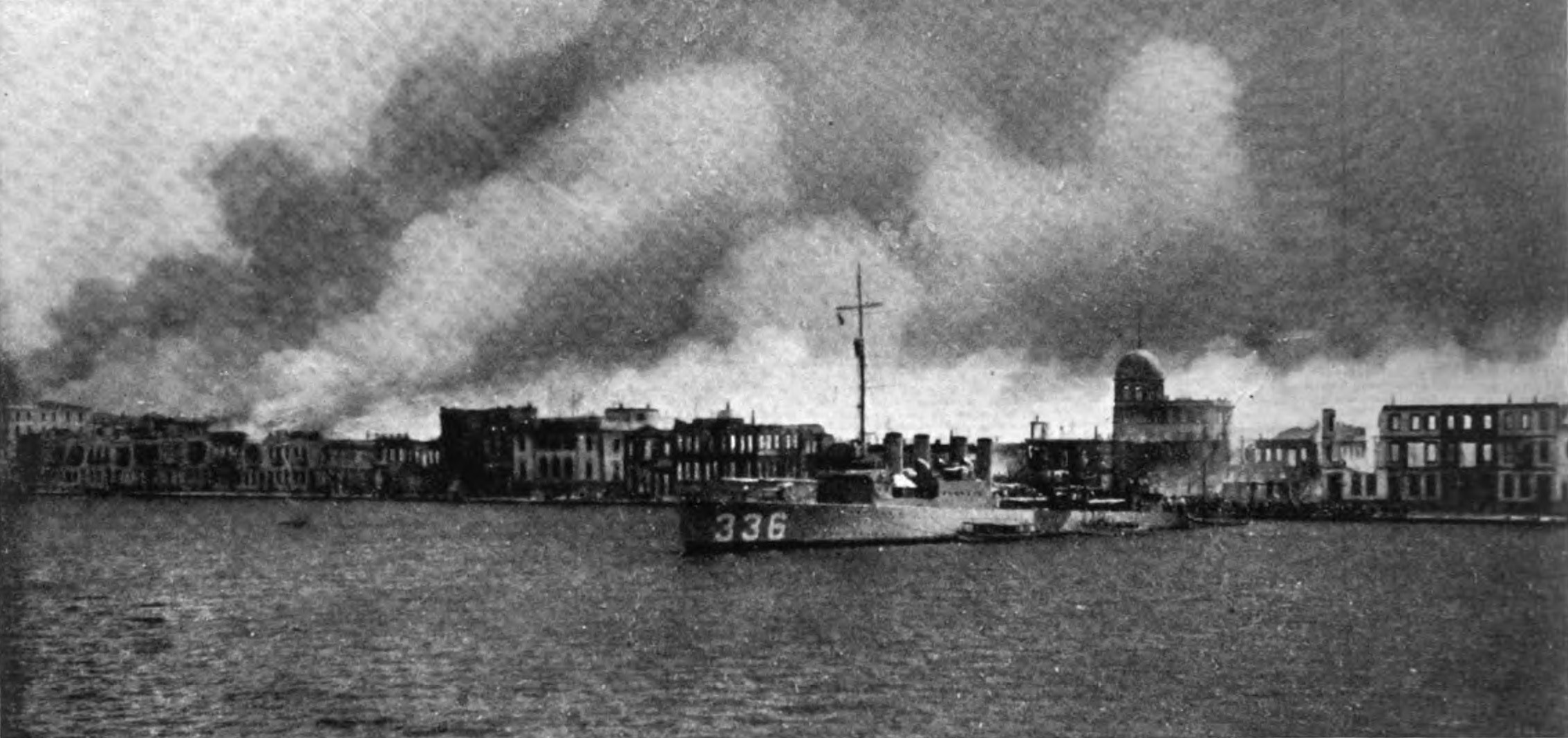
Litchfield at the Great Fire of Smyrna.

Late in 1923, Litchfield returned to the United States, her cargo including the remains of World War I hero George Dilboy which were being returned to the US for reburial after his original grave was desecrated as part of the Greco-Turkish conflict. Litchfield entered the New York Navy Yard on 30 October 1923 for overhaul. Litchfield joined Destroyer Squadron 12 based at San Diego 24 May 1924. During maneuvers and tactical exercises with the battle fleet in October, she was awarded prize money for her competitive short-range firing.

Annual competition and monthly maneuvers were supplemented in 1925 by a training cruise to Australia and New Zealand. On 4 June 1927 she participated in her first presidential review off Newport, Rhode Island. Returning to the Pacific, Litchfield spent most of July off the coast of politically disturbed Nicaragua. She survived both the cutback in naval tonnage agreed upon at the 1930 London Naval Conference and the economy measures of the early years of the great depression.

In April 1937, Litchfield, as part of the Battle Fleet, changed her permanent base from the west coast to Pearl Harbor. On 20 May she became flagship of Submarine Squadron 4, Submarine Force, Pearl Harbor, and continued to operate with submarines as war approached and training drills intensified during 1941. In company with the submarine Thresher, she departed her base 6 December and returned on 9 December to the destruction wrought by the Japanese attack on Pearl Harbor. With the outbreak of war in the Pacific, Litchfield's duties involved the escort of U.S. submarines both in and out of port and anti-submarine patrol off the entrance to Pearl Harbor. Several times she made depth charge runs but no kills were confirmed prior to her departure 6 November 1943 for overhaul at Bremerton, Washington.

=== Fate ===
Upon her return to Pearl Harbor on 14 January 1944, she escorted a series of convoys to Midway and Eniwetok. Twice near Midway, she rescued crews of downed patrol planes and she salvaged a Martin PBM Mariner on 8 August. Litchfield also conducted submarine training exercises in the vicinity of each of these two bases. On 17 March 1945 an escort mission brought her to Guam, her furthest wartime penetration of the western Pacific. While performing escort and training duties with U.S. submarines at Guam on 31 March, she was redesignated AG-95, a miscellaneous auxiliary. Ending these duties 21 July, she arrived in San Diego 9 August.

The next week the Board of Inspectors recommended Litchfield be scrapped. Arriving Philadelphia in October, she decommissioned 5 November 1945 and was struck from the Naval Vessel Register 28 November. Scrapping was completed by the Philadelphia Navy Yard 29 March 1946.
