= Iakovos Makrygiannis =

Metropolitan of Elassona

Iakovos Makrygiannis (Greek: Ιάκωβος Μακρυγιάννης), born Dimosthenis Makrygiannis (Greek: Δημοσθένης Μακρυγιάννης; 1910 in Alatsata – 1971), was a Greek theologian and bishop who served as Metropolitan of Elassona.

== Biography ==
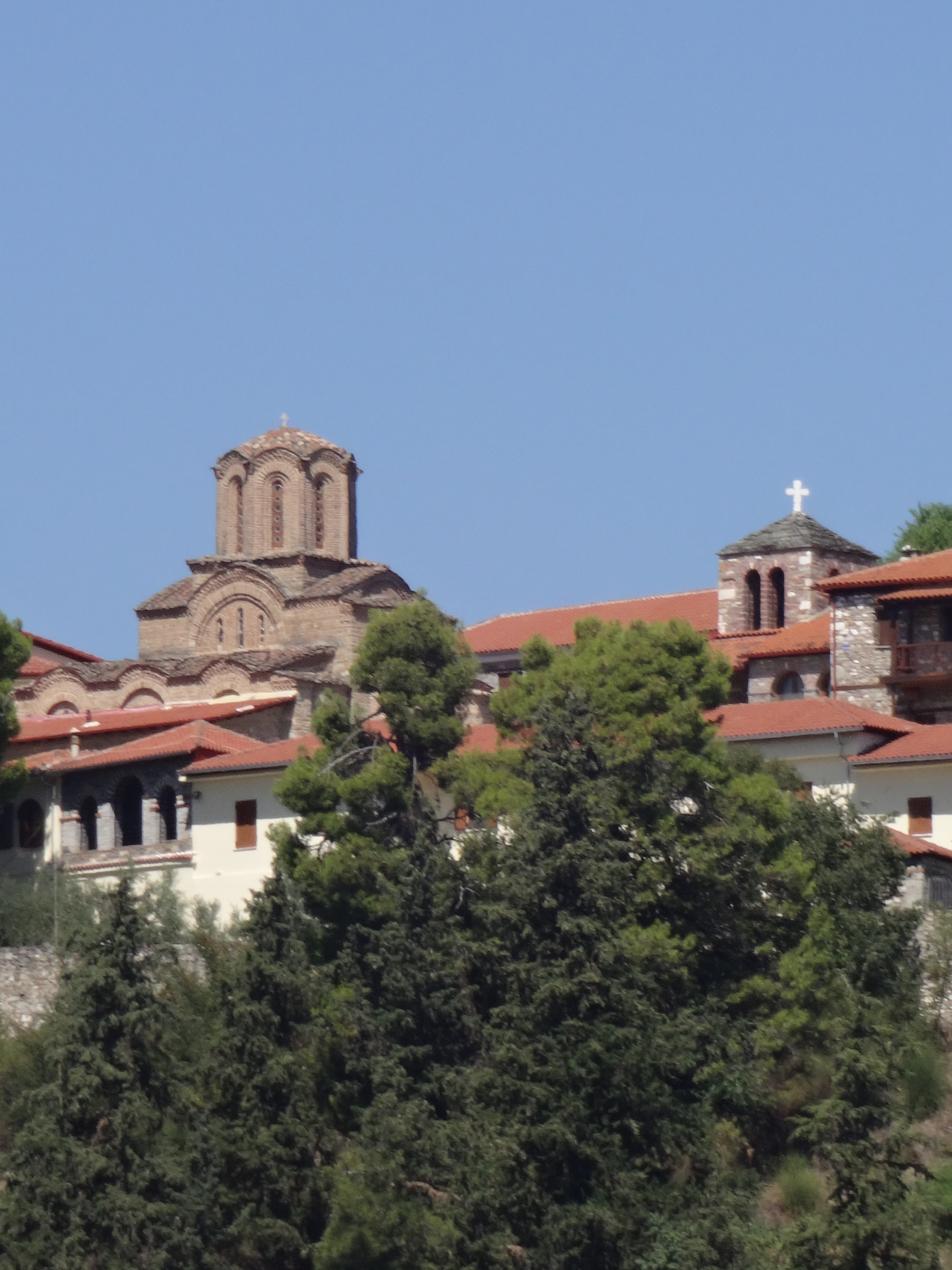
Panagia Olympiotissa Monastery, which was renovated during Iakovos Makrygiannis' primacy

Iakovos Makrygiannis, baptised Dimosthenis, was born in 1910 in Alatsata, Ottoman Empire. He studied Theology at the Department of Theology of the University of Athens. He was ordained a deacon in 1937 by the Archbishop of Athens, Chrysostomos, taking on the monastic name Iakovos. In 1940 he was ordained a priest and served as a vicar in the Archbishopric of Athens (Temple of Saint Demetrius of Psychiko) and as abbot of the monastery of Penteli from 1945 to 1955.

=== Metropolitan of Elassona ===
On 2 March 1956, he was elected Metropolitan of Elassona and two days later he was ordained a bishop in the Metropolitan Cathedral of Athens. He did important spiritual, philanthropic, and cultural work, including:

- founding camps
- organising a youth foundation
- creating a boarding school for the children from mountainous areas who studied in the Gymnasium in Elassona and couldn't afford shelter.

He personally took care of public works such as the electrification of remote villages and the creation of roads. With his suggestion, the annual celebration of the Eleftheria of Elassona on 6 October was introduced, as a local holiday commemorating the liberation of the city on 12 October 1912.

=== Persecution by the dictatorship ===
On 2 August 1967, he was irregularly removed from his position by the Greek junta, which had intervened in the Synod of the Hierarchy of the Church of Greece, forcing him to resign. This was a common tactic by the regime used against different metropolitans as well. In this way, the dictatorship managed to replace bishops who didn't cooperate with the regime with ones with more friendly attitudes.

=== Death and memory ===
Iakovos died on 20 July 1971 in Loutraki, where he resided as the dictatorship didn't allow him to return to Elassona. He was buried in the cemetery of Chalandri by relatives and friends. His boned were transferred by order of metropolitan Vasileios to the Panagia Olympiotissa Monastery, so Iakovos could return to the city post-mortem, despite his irregular removal from his position. In his memory, a central road in Elassona is named after him.

== Sources ==
- Charalampos (Charis) Andreopoulos, Η Εκκλησία κατά τη δικτατορία 1967-1974. Ιστορική και νομοκανονική προσέγγιση, Epikentro Editions, Thessaloniki, 2017
