= Çağla Kubat =

Turkish model, actress and windsurfer

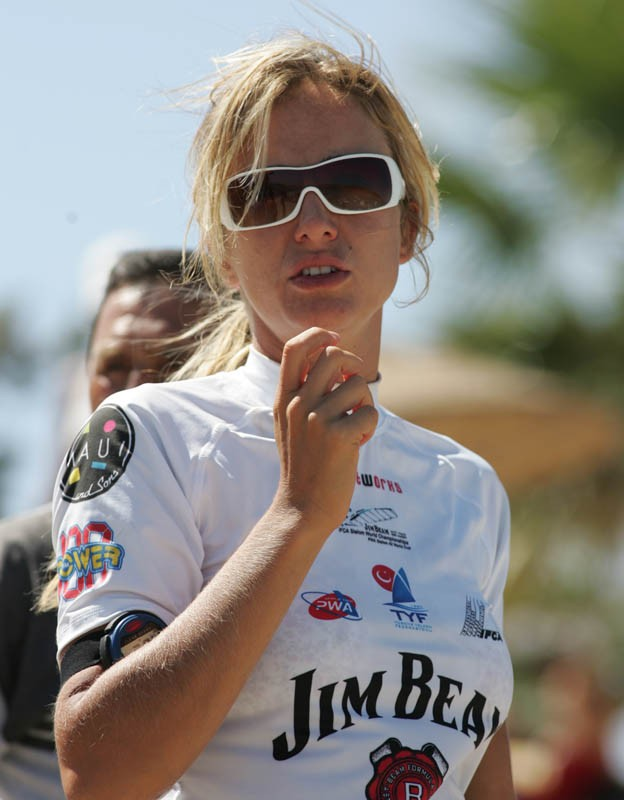
- Çağla Kubat in the heat of the contest during 2006 PWA IFCA World Slalom Championship in Alaçatı
- Born: 16 November 1979 (age 46); İzmir, Turkey
- Occupation: Windsurfer
- Spouse: Jimmy Diaz (m. 2013)
- Children: 1

Çağla Kubat (Turkish pronunciation: [ˈtʃaːɫa kuˈbat]; born 16 November 1979) is a Turkish actress, model, windsurfer and beauty pageant titleholder. She is member of Fenerbahçe sailing & windsurfing team.

She was born in İzmir. She graduated from Italian High School of Istanbul and Istanbul Technical University with a bachelor's degree in mechanical engineering. She was the first runner-up for the Miss Turkey 2002 beauty pageant and represented Turkey at Miss Universe 2002.

== Sports ==
Çağla is also a champion windsurfer, having won the IFCA windsurfing European Slalom Championship in 2005, in Alaçatı. In 2006, in her first PWA (Professional Windsurfers Association) event, she placed 6th in IFCA Slalom World Championship.

She founded her own windsurfing school "Çağla Kubat Windsurf Academy" in Alaçatı, İzmir Province. She ranked third in the women's category at the 2012 World Slalom Championship in Spain. In 2013, she became champion in the Master Female Slalom category of the IFCA Junior, Youth & Masters Slalom World Championships held in Alaçatı. She took the third rank at the 2013 World Cup.

== Acting ==
She starred in successful leading female roles in two Turkish TV series to date. These are Sağır Oda ("The deaf room") in 2006 and Kuzey Rüzgarı ("The northern wind") with Kadir İnanır and Oktay Kaynarca. She also had a leading role on Arka Sokaklar from 2009 to 2011.

== Personal life ==
Çağla Kubat married American surfer Jimmy Diaz on 21 September 2013.
