= Mehmet Culum =

Turkish writer

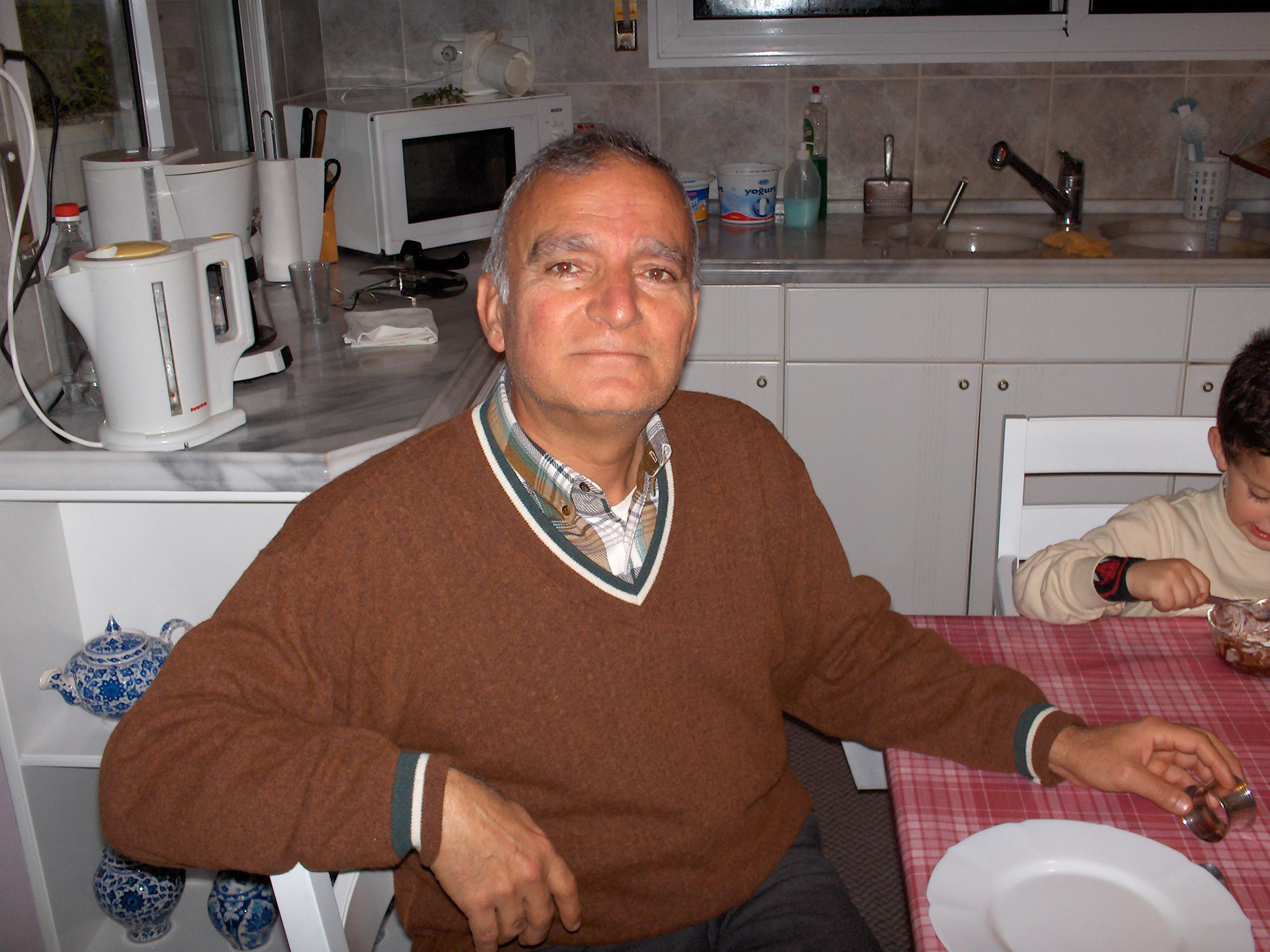
- Mehmet Culum
- Born: 1948 (age 77–78); Çeşme, Turkey
- Occupation: Author

Mehmet Culum (born 1948) is a contemporary Turkish novelist who was born in Çeşme, a town on the western coast of Turkey. He studied political sciences at the University of Ankara. Before starting an antique shop in his hometown, Culum worked as an IT consultant for some time in İzmir. After retiring in 1998, he began to explore the history of Western Turkey and especially the Çeşme Peninsula.

== Work as an author ==
His first book, Azab Aga, was published in April 2004. Culum wrote the factually accurate history of his family in this book, not changing the names of characters and events. The book's events took place in the first half of the 20th century.

The compilation of the stories to which he listened while in the region of Alaçatı was the theme of his second book, Alaçatili, which was published in June 2006. The book's events center around a lawyer of Greek origin from New York City who seeks the roots of his family in Alaçatı, which was a Greek settlement for almost a century.

Culum was inspired by the true stories of the Çeşme Peninsula when he authored his third novel Kalenin Gölgesinde Çeşme, which became available to readers in April 2009. Culum has published his fourth novel Yengec Disi in January 2018.

He made his fifth book about the days ataturk spent in Çesme titled: Atatürk’ün Çeşme Günleri in 2024.
