= Fischer Francis Trees & Watts =

Former asset manager in New York

Fischer Francis Trees & Watts (FFTW) was an asset management firm based in New York, established in 1972 and fully owned by BNP Paribas since 2006. It has been a pioneer in investment services to central banks from around the world in the US market.

== Overview ==
FFTW was created in 1972 by founding partners Richard Fischer, Stephen Francis, James Trees, and John Watts. In 1974, it started to develop investment services to central banks, in partnership with financier John Olcay who joined the firm in 1983 and later became its vice chairman. FFTW expanded to London in 1989 and to Singapore in 1995.

In 1999, Banque Nationale de Paris bought a 25 percent stake in FFTW, which its successor BNP Paribas later raised up to 100 percent in 2006 while committing to preserve FFTW's operational independence. By then, FFTW had $38 billion under management, which grew to $54 billion five years later, with more than half from clients established outside the Americas. The acquisition provided BNP Paribas with unique expertise in serving the investment needs of central banks, not least in the market for US mortgage-backed securities.

== See also ==
- BNP Paribas
