= Yavuz Tatış =

- Cover of the book on Yavuz Tatış collection
- Born: 1947 (age 78–79); İzmir
- Occupation: Businessman

Nuri Yavuz Tatış (born 1947), also known simply as Yavuz Tatış is a businessman from İzmir, Turkey, who has accumulated over the years one of the richest private collections in Turkey of historical artifacts dating from the Anatolian, Ancient Greek, Roman and Byzantine periods.

Tatış was born in 1947 in İzmir. The family company, the Tatış Group, is among the most prominent names in the city's business world, and his father, Bahattin Tatış, was also the founder of the Turkish College of İzmir, considered among the best high schools in Turkey. Yavuz Tatış himself has graduated from this school founded by his father and he did his university studies in the West Virginia University in business management.

On his return to Turkey, he started his own company, and at the same time, he displayed a keen interest for the historical riches of the country, confirmed at first by his acting on his own to acquire a tourist guide's licence and then serving as guide for dignitaries visiting Turkey. Later, as of 1993, he started to accumulate diverse artifacts of antiquity. What started as a hobby has in time become a full-time occupation and he is better known in Turkey today in his quality of an expert private collector, rather than through his business porte-feuille.

In 2004, some pieces of his collection has been presented in the form of a book (in Turkish) "Anadolu Medeniyetlerinden Kültür Yansımaları" (Reflections of the Culture from Anatolian Civilizations). The international team of experts brought together by him for the book and the intentionally luxurious edition is meant to encourage other Turkish private collectors to take similar initiatives for their collection to be brought to the knowledge of the public. Since then, Tatış has completed an edition of his book in English and in a more extensive scope, which proves difficult to put the finishing touches since new gems arrive all the time. In the meantime, he is taking steps with a view to establishing a Yavuş Tatış Museum in İzmir, whose works have started, and is also deepening research in the specialist's field of Byzantine seals, having put together a unique collection in these. In 2006, he also published a second book in which he collected various observation drawn from business and everyday life, titled "Experiences" (Deneyimler).

== Bibliography ==
- "Anadolu Medeniyetlerinden Kültür Yansımaları" (Reflections of the Culture from Anatolian Civilizations) to be published in English under the name "Antiquities from the Collection of Yavuz Tatış"
- "Deneyimler" (Experiences)
